= Ribać =

Ribać is a Serbian surname. People with the name include:

- Ivan Ribać (born 1977), Serbian athlete and politician
- Milivoje Ribać (born 1952), Kosovo Serb politician

== See also ==
- Riba (surname)
- Riba (disambiguation)
- Ribak (surname)
- Ribar (name)
- Rabic (disambiguation)
