= Santiago Mariño =

Venezuelan revolutionary (1785–1854)

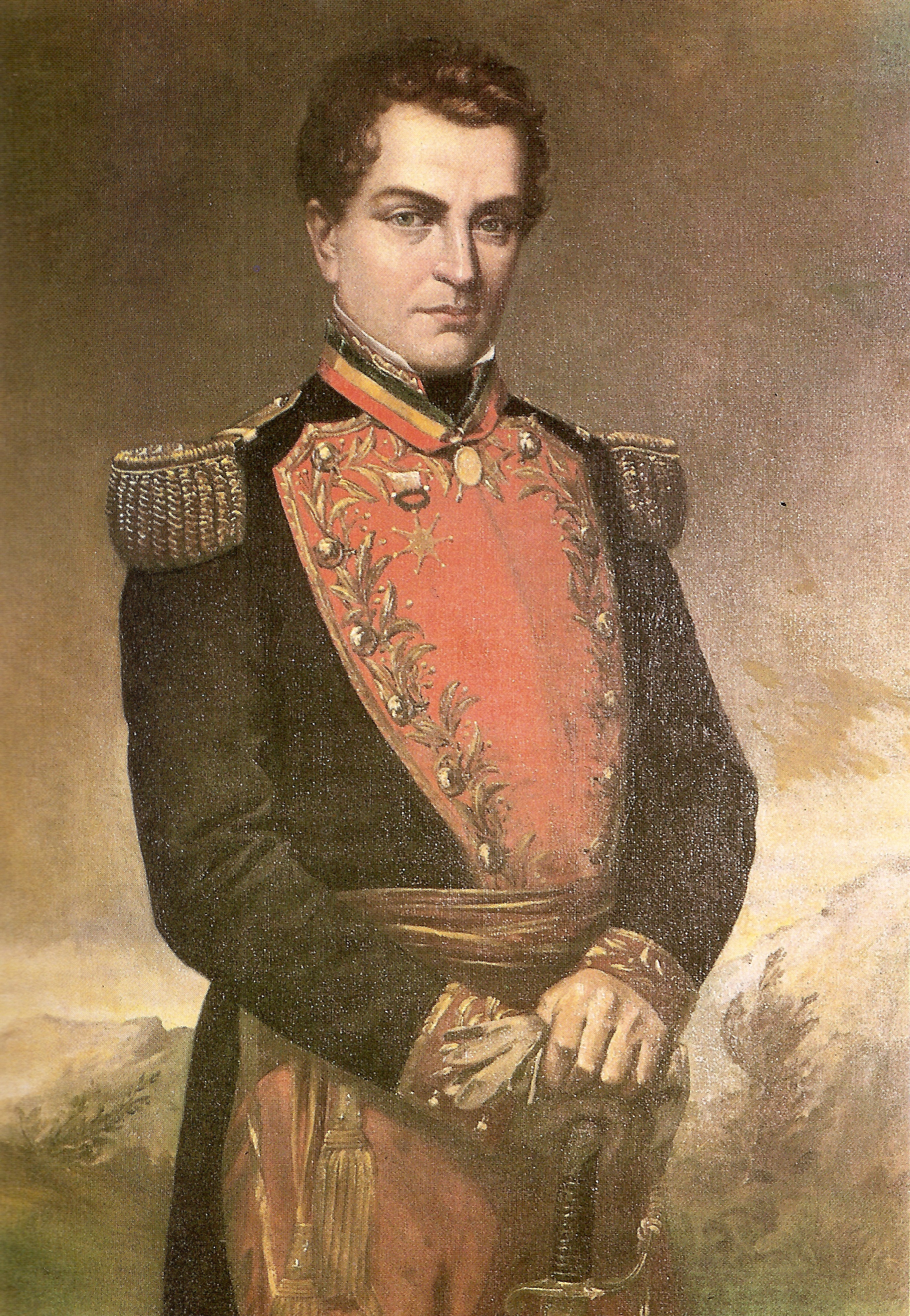
- Portrait of Santiago Mariño by painter Martín Tovar y Tovar, oil on canvas, 1874
- Born: 25 July 1788; Island of Margarita, Captaincy General of Venezuela, Spanish Empire
- Died: 4 September 1854 (aged 66); La Victoria, Aragua, State of Venezuela
- Military career
- Allegiance: (Venezuela) Venezuelan republicans
- Rank: Chief of the General Staff
- Conflicts: Battle of Bocachica; Battle of Carabobo
- Other work: Ministry of War and Navy (1830s)

Santiago Mariño Carige Fitzgerald (25 July 1788 in Valle Espíritu Santo, Margarita – 4 September 1854 in La Victoria, Aragua) was a nineteenth-century Venezuelan revolutionary leader and hero in the Venezuelan War of Independence (1811–1823). He became an important leader of eastern Venezuela and for a short while in 1835 seized power over the new state of Venezuela.

== Family ==
His father was the captain of the "Santiago Mariño de Acuña" militias and "Lieutenant Greater Justice of the Gulf of Paria". His mother, Atanasia Carige Fitzgerald, of Creole and Irish descent, was from Chaguaramas in the island of Trinidad, where his parents resided while he was a boy. He had a sister, Concepción Mariño. Due to his parents' wealth he was well educated. After his father's death in 1808, he moved to the island of Margarita (about 250 km west of Trinidad, off the Venezuelan coast), to take possession of his inheritance.

=== Masonry ===
Mariño was also one of the greatest figures in the history of Freemasonry in Venezuela, although he was apparently initiated in Trinidad. He was awarded the title of "Serenismo Gran Maestro del Gran Oriente Nacional" ('The Most Serene Grand Master of the Great National East", a title equivalent to the modern Grand Master).

== Revolutionary Wars ==
=== Napoleonic Wars: War of Spanish Independence (1808–1814) ===
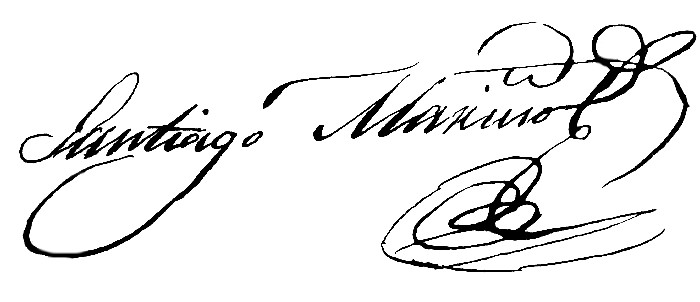
Signature of Santiago Mariño

The rise of the revolutionary movement in Venezuela was strongly influenced by the confusing and rapidly changing situation in Spain. Spain was initially against France in the Napoleonic Wars, but in 1795 France declared war on Spain which concluded an alliance with France and declared war on Great Britain. The British responded by blockading Spain, whose colonies were for the first time cut off from their colonial rulers, and began to trade independently with Britain.

==== British support for the Venezuelan revolutionaries from Trinidad ====
Thomas Picton, the first British Governor of Trinidad after the capitulation of the Spanish, who held office from 1797 to 1803, was a great support to the revolutionaries or "Patriots" in Venezuela. Soon after becoming governor, he issued a proclamation on 6 June 1797, based on suggestions from Britain, which stated:

"The object which at present I desire most particularly to bring to your attention, is the means which might best be adopted to liberate the people of the continent near to the Island of Trinidad from the oppressive and tyrannic system which supports with so much vigour the monopoly of commerce.... In order to fulfil this intention with the greater facility, it will be prudent for your Excellency to animate the inhabitants of Trinidad in keeping up the communication which they had with those of Tierra Firma previous to the reduction of that Island, under assurance that they will find there an entrepot or general magazines of every sort of every sort of goods whatsoever. To this end His Britannic Majesty has determined in Council to grant freedom to the ports of Trinidad, with a direct trade to Great Britain...."

Ironically, the 1807 devastating defeat of the British invasions of the River Plate in South America, largely by local militias, encouraged a more independent attitude in Spain's American colonies.

==== Spanish power weakens, paving the way to Independence ====
After the Battle of Trafalgar (21 October 1805), Spain changed sides again, only to realign itself with France after Napoleon defeated Prussia in 1807. However, Spain had been severely weakened by all these wars, opening an opportunity for the revolutionaries in South America.

Following this, the Spanish king, Ferdinand VII, was deposed by Napoleon in 1808. He had been on the throne just 48 days after his father Charles IV abdicated in his favor. He was replaced by Joseph Bonaparte, the elder brother of Napoleon, who ruled as king of Spain from 6 June 1808 to 11 December 1813. A "Supreme Central Junta" was formed to govern in the name of Ferdinand, marking the beginning of Spain's War of Independence from French domination.

Joseph Bonaparte and his brother, Napoleon, led a long and bitter war against the British forces under the Duke of Wellington, culminating in Napoleon being forced to allow the reinstatement of Ferdinand VII on 11 December 1813, who ruled Spain until his death in 1833.

=== First Republic ===
On 19 April 1810 the city council or cabildo of Caracas reformed itself as a Junta, soon to be followed by the provincial centres such as Barcelona, Cumaná, Mérida, and Trujillo. They saw themselves as allied with the Junta of Seville which ruled in the name of the king. Simón Bolívar saw the setting up of the Junta as a step toward outright independence.

Ports were opened to international trade, particularly with Britain which received preferential treatment, paying 25% less tax than other nations. The young Bolívar went to London and Mariño to Port of Spain (Trinidad) to seek support if Venezuela was attacked and to pressure the Spanish grants special privileged. This was difficult to do as Britain and Spain were allies, but he was given promises of future trade concessions. Spain viewed these developments with alarm and, in 1810, declared the popular party rebels, the province was treated as enemy territory and its ports were blockaded. Sir Thomas Hislop

The Royalists held Guyana and the Orinoco Delta, while the rebel Patriots held the coasts from Maturín to Cape la Peña. Francisco de Miranda returned to Caracas following the outbreak of the Venezuelan War of Independence in 1810 and fueled the Patriotic Society to separate Venezuela from Spain rule. After the establishment of the First Republic in 1811, 5 July the Frigate Captain Domingo de Monteverde was sent to Venezuela from Puerto Rico. He arrived at La Vela de Coro in early March 1812 along with other Spanish marines. Monteverde was ordered by the governor of Coro, with a small force of 1550 men with soldiers and officers, to aid the small town of Siquisique but marched to Valencia. After the Earthquake of Caracas March 26, 1812 Miranda was granted dictatorial powers

In March 1812 Mariño joined Colonel Manuel Villapol, who marched to Guayana. Excelling in combat, he was promoted to lieutenant colonel. Some months later he was appointed Commander of Güiria, bravely defending that centre of the Royalists' assault, and was promoted to the rank of colonel.

After the Battle of San Mateo, the First Republic collapsed, and Francisco de Miranda capitulated to Monteverde, signing an armistice on 25 July 1812. Other revolutionary leaders including Simón Bolívar considered his capitulation treasonous, and allowed his arrest by the Spanish authorities. He was taken to a prison in Cádiz, where he died four years later.

Mariño's Venezuelan Patriots who survived either fled or were imprisoned. Mariño himself retired to a property owned by his sister, in Trinidad.

=== Second Republic ===
==== Mariño's invasion of Venezuela ====
Mariño was informed of the ill-treatment that befell Miranda and the other patriotic men, by the Royalist leader General Domingo de Monteverde, who violated the terms of the armistice by imprisoning many Venezuelans. Indignant at such abuse, Mariño assembled an expeditionary force of 45 Patriots on the small island of Chacachacare off the coast of Trinidad. Among this small group were the future Generals José Francisco Bermúdez, Francisco Azcue and Manuel Piar. With that handful of revolutionaries with a few muskets, they crossed the Gulf of Paria in canoes, and landed on the coast of Venezuela on 11 January 1813.

Just prior to Mariño's force leaving, the Governor of Trinidad, General Hector William Munro intent on proving Trinidad's neutrality, sent a detachment of the 1st West India Regiment to the tiny island of Chacachacare to investigate claims that a military force was gathering there and to disperse it peacefully, if possible. They returned to report they had discovered nothing, but Munro issued a Proclamation stating that the Government of Trinidad was strictly neutral, and officially banished Mariño from Trinidad (after he had left) and seized the property of all those involved with the affair.

The tiny invasion force captured Guiria, a small town on the gulf coast of Venezuela. Fortunately for them, the main body of 500 Royalist troops had recently moved inland, leaving only the local militia which was quickly overcome.

News of the victory spread quickly and Mariño was soon leading a force of 5,000 men armed and equipped with supplies captured at Guiria. They then marched against Maturín on the Rio Guarapiche. Apparently, Bolívar was pleased that the Royalists would now have to fight on two fronts but he wanted to liberate Caracas before Mariño was able to do so.

==== Tussles with Bolívar and other independence leaders ====
In 1813 Simón Bolívar joined the army of United Provinces of New Granada. After winning a series of battles, Bolívar received the approval of the "New Granadan Congress" to lead a liberating force into Venezuela in what became known as the Admirable Campaign. At the same time, Santiago Mariño invaded from the east in an independently organized campaign. Both forces quickly defeated the royalist troops in various battles, such as Alto de los Godos. Bolívar entered Caracas on 6 August 1813, proclaiming the restoration of the Venezuelan republic, which was not fully recognized by Mariño based in Cumaná, although the two leaders did cooperate militarily. There was a struggle between the two men for the leadership. Mariño named himself "Chief of the Independent Army," conquered eastern Venezuela, and set up a separate political entity in the east. But Bolívar insisted that it was essential to have one central government uniting Venezuela and New Granada to ensure its viability – his first proposal of a greater Colombia.

In February and March 1814, Mariño and his forces fought alongside Bolívar. They regrouped at Valencia and Bolívar handed over command to Mariño, "as a sure sign of his high opinion of his person and services, and also in this way to ensure the adhesion of the eastern officers to the common cause of Venezuela." However, due to their series of repeated reverses they both had to retreat from central Venezuela to the port of Carúpano. Bolívar and Mariño were arrested and removed from power by José Félix Ribas and Manuel Piar, each representing the two republican commands then in place in Venezuela. A few days later Ribas and Piar decided not to try them and instead released them into exile. On 8 September, after the fall of the second republic, Bolívar and Mariño set sail for Cartagena de Indias, leaving Piar and Ribas to lead the increasingly encircled republicans. In 1815 Bolivar and Mariño left for Jamaica and Haiti. In 1816 participated in the first expedition of Les Cayes and arriving at Venezuela was named second of the Liberator. Defeated in Ocumare de la Costa Bolívar returned from Haiti to Barcelona calling on all to join together, but first Bermúdez and Valdéz rebelled against Mariño, and then Mariño against Bolívar. In 1816 Bolívar used the island of Margarita as his base of operations and, in 1817, the Spanish General Pablo Morillo was driven off the island. He inspired the Cariaco Congress with Jose Cortés de Madariaga, in which federalism was revived in Venezuela, that caused a clash with Bolivar that dissolved the Congress. As a deputy, Mariño represented the province of Cumaná in the second Congress of Venezuela, meeting in Angostura on 15 February 1819, from which he had the license to return to the army. That same year, it triumphed over the colonel Eugenio Arana in the combat of Cantaura and while Bolivar operated in the liberation of Viceroyalty of New Granada took part in the movement that displaced Francisco Antonio Zea of the vice-presidency of the Republic. In his place was named the general in chief Juan Bautista Arismendi, and Mariño was nominated commander in chief of the army of the east. Once Bolivar arrived in the city of Angostura, Mariño was promoted as the General Staff.

==== Rapprochement with Bolívar and other leaders finally leads to Independence ====
Gradually more and more of the caudillos (warlords or political bosses) began to join Bolívar, but then Piar rebelled against him and was finally put to death in October 1817. Conflict between Bolívar and Mariño escalated and in 1818 distracted the military campaign enough to allow the Royalists to dominate Cumaná. Finally Bolívar managed to win Mariño over by appointing him General-in-Chief of the Army of the East with control over the plains of Barcelona, while Bermúdez and Cedeño were given the rest of the eastern districts and Páez was yet to be pacified. On 17 December 1819 the Congress of Angostura established Gran Colombia's independence from Spain.

Mariño was a member of the Venezuelan Congress in 1819 and was Chief of Staff during the second Battle of Carabobo, which, on 24 June 1821, finally secured Venezuelan independence.

=== Later activities ===
In May 1831, a council of 150 residents of the city of Barcelona, General Santiago Mariño and José Tadeo Monagas were invested as the principal authorities of the "State of the East", until the installation of the first Congress to be convened later. After that, President José Antonio Páez stopped this separatist attempt, negotiating with the Monagas brothers, convincing them to submit to central authority.

On 8 July 1835, there was a violent and bloody military coup to overthrough president Jose Maria Vargas, known as the "Revolución de las Reformas", headed by Mariño, which had the objectives of establishing military control, the religion of the State, to vindicate the name of Simón Bolivar as Liberator, and to reconstruct Great Colombia. On 9 July 1835 President Vargas and Vice-president Andrés Narvarte were expelled to the Island of Saint Thomas, and Mariño briefly took the power of the country. However, José Antonio Páez and his forces entered Caracas on 28 July to find it abandoned by the Reformists, and reinstated Vargas, putting an early end to Mariño's military rule. Mariño was forced into exile in 1836, fleeing to Curaçao, Jamaica, Haiti, and finally Colombia.

Mariño returned to Venezuela in 1848 and became Army Chief under President José Tadeo Monagas to confront his former leader, General José Antonio Páez, also President of Venezuela.

Mariño unsuccessfully bid for the presidency of Venezuela several times in the 1830s and 40s. In 1848 he led the forces supporting President Monagas which overthrew Páez at the 'Batalla de Los Araguatos' on 10 March 1848. Páez was imprisoned, and eventually exiled.

Mariño died in the town of La Victoria on 4 September (or, according to one source, 20 November), 1854.

== Legacy ==
Mariño appears as a Comandante General in Sid Meier's Civilization VI, available only to users playing as the Gran Colombia civilization.

== See also ==
- Venezuela
- History of Venezuela
- Venezuelan War of Independence
- Second Republic of Venezuela
