= Ribas =

Ribas may refer to:

- Manoel Ribas, municipality in the state of Paraná, Brazil
- Mission Ribas, Venezuelan Bolivarian mission
- Ribas do Rio Pardo, municipality in the state of Mato Grosso do Sul, Brazil
- Ribas de Campos, municipality in the province of Palencia, Castile and León, Spain
- Ribas de Sil, town in the province of Lugo, Spain

== People ==
- Andrés Pérez De Ribas (1576–1655), Spanish Jesuit missionary and historian
- Andreson Dourado Ribas (b. 1985), Brazilian football player
- Antoni Ribas (1935–2007), Catalan Spanish film director and screenwriter
- Arthur Bernardes Ribas da Silva Filho (b. 1955), Brazilian football manager
- Biel Ribas (b. 1985), Spanish footballer
- Diego Sebastián Ribas (b. 1980), Uruguayan footballer
- Diego Ribas da Cunha (b. 1985), Brazilian footballer
- Fernando Ribas-Dominicci (1952–1986), F-111F pilot in the United States Air Force
- Francisco José Ribas (1764–1828), Venezuelan philosopher
- Jaume Giró i Ribas (born 1964), Catalan corporate executive
- José de Ribas (1749–1800), Russian admiral of Spanish-Irish origin
- José Félix Ribas (1775–1815), Venezuelan independence leader
- José María del Carmen Ribas (1796–1861), Spanish flautist
- Julio César Ribas (b. 1957), Uruguayan association football manager and former footballer
- Mariona Ribas (b. 1984), Spanish actress
- Óscar Ribas (1909–2004), Angolan writer
- Òscar Ribas Reig (b. 1936), first prime minister of Andorra
- Pau Ribas (b. 1987), Spanish-Catalan basketball player
- Sebastián Ribas (b. 1988), Uruguay football striker
- Tomaz Ribas (1918–1999), Portuguese writer, ethnologist and critic of theatre and dance
- Toni Ribas (b. 1975), Spanish pornographic actor and director

== See also ==
- Riba (disambiguation)
- José Félix Ribas Municipality (disambiguation), several places
- Saribas
