= Battle of Maturín =

The Battle of Maturín can refer to one of five battles of the Venezuelan War of Independence around the city of Maturín in Eastern Venezuela :

- First Battle of Maturín : 20 March 1813, Patriot victory.
- Second Battle of Maturín : 11 April 1813, Patriot victory.
- Third Battle of Maturín a.k.a. Battle of Alto de los Godos : 25 May 1813, Patriot victory.
- Fourth Battle of Maturín : 12 September 1814, Patriot victory.
- Fifth Battle of Maturín : 11 December 1814, Royalist victory.
