= History of Venezuela =

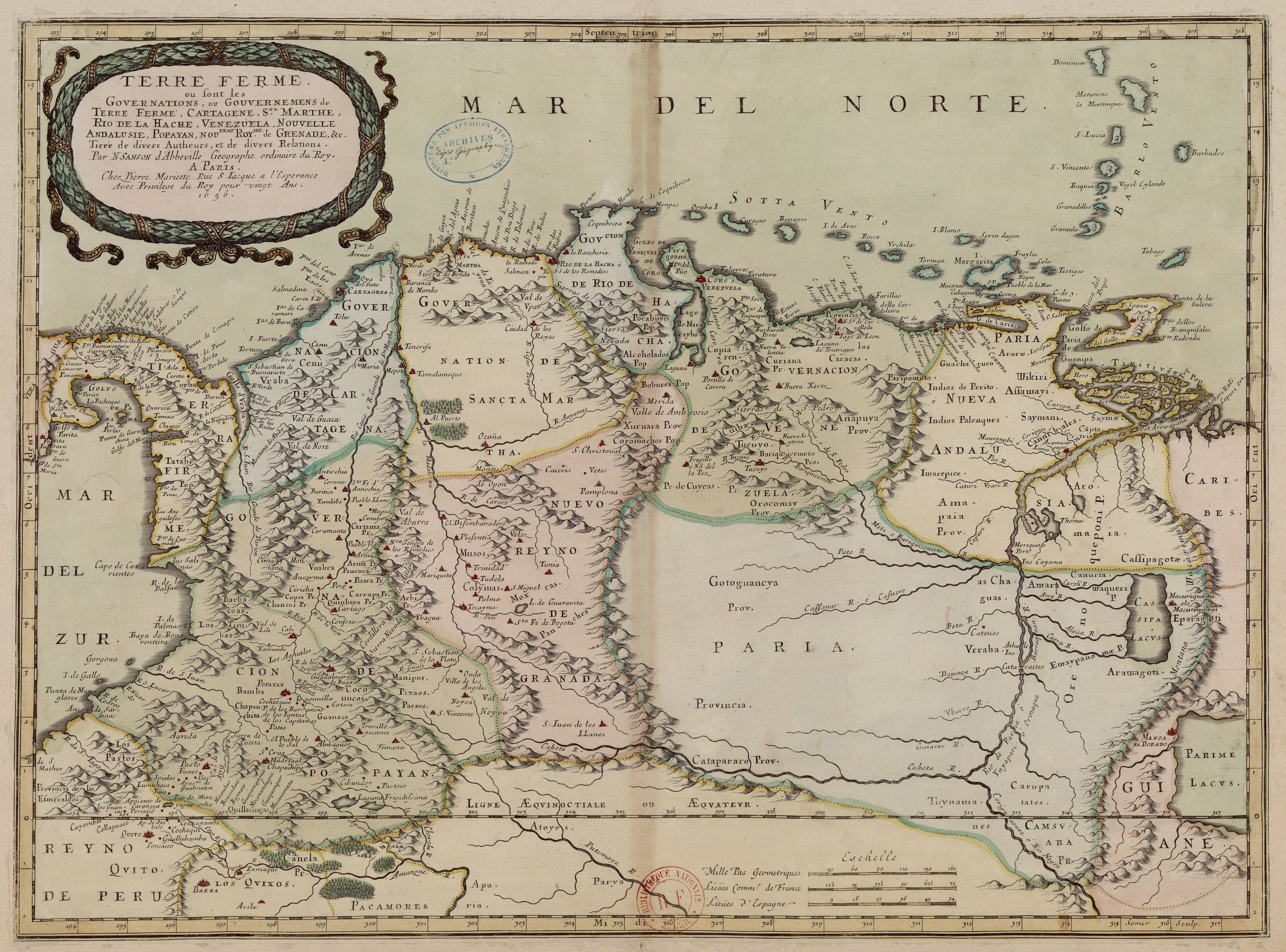
The Province of Venezuela in 1656, by Sanson Nicolas. One of the first maps of Venezuela and the Caribbean.

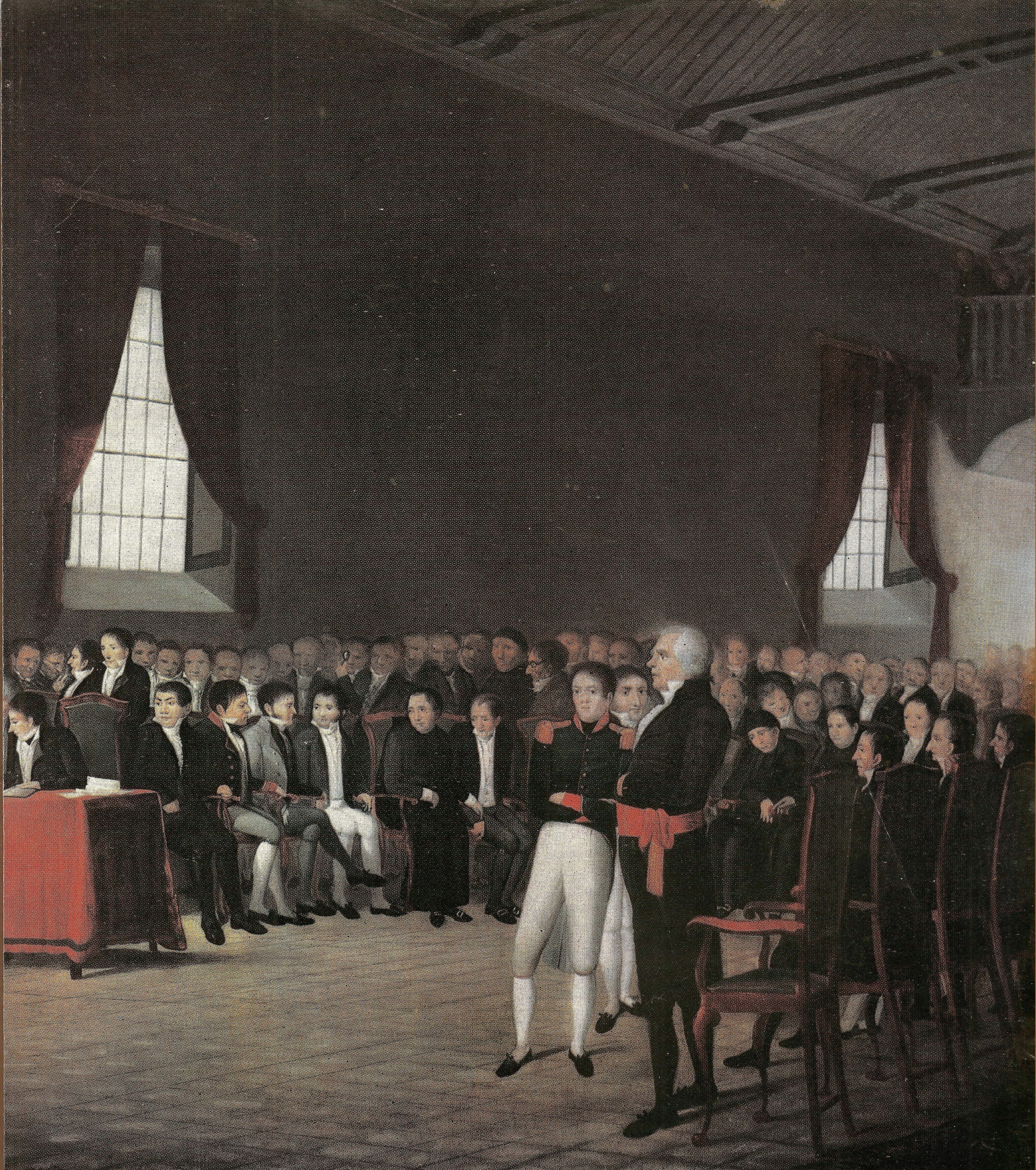
Venezuelan Declaration of Independence (fragment), painting by Juan Lovera in 1811.

The history of Venezuela reflects events in areas of the Americas colonized by Spain starting 1502; amid resistance from indigenous peoples, led by Native caciques, such as Guaicaipuro and Tamanaco. However, in the Andean region of western Venezuela, complex Andean civilization of the Timoto-Cuica people flourished before European contact.

After the first contacts between Europeans, specifically Portuguese and Spanish conquerors, there were no significant events between 1515 and 1528. The biggest event that happened after 1528 was the German Colonization of Venezuela. This event occurred because of a business between Charles V and the banking family of the Augsburg. Charles V gave the family of the Augsburg most of the territory of the Province of Venezuela, which after the concession was called by the Germans "Klein-Venedig" which means "Little Venice". The Germans in Venezuela were mostly conquistadores or explorers, which their mission was to find El Dorado. At the same time, the German explorers and conquistadores founded two standing cities in actuality, Maracaibo and Neu-Augsburg, which is the today's city of Coro. After the unsuccessful plan of the Germans of finding El Dorado, the Augsburg gave the concession to the Spanish crown. After this, the Spanish conquistadores continued their missions in the territory and the most representative event after the Augsburg concession was the foundation of Caracas, which was the most longstanding capital of the Province of Venezuela and the today's capital city of Venezuela. The colonial economy in the 16th and 17th centuries was centered on gold mining and livestock farming.

Relatively few colonists employed native farmers on their estates and enslaved other native peoples and later Africans to work in the mines. The territory of Venezuela was at various times ruled by the capitals of distant New Spain and the Viceroyalty of Peru. In the 18th century, cocoa plantations grew along the coast, which were processed by further importing African slaves. Cocoa beans became Venezuela's main export, monopolized by the Guipuzcoan Company of Caracas. Most of the surviving locals had migrated south by then, where Spanish monks worked. Intellectual activity increased among the white Creole elite and was centered on the University of Caracas. The Province of Venezuela was incorporated into the Viceroyalty of New Granada in 1717 and became Captaincy General of Venezuela in 1777. In 1811, it became one of the first Spanish-American colonies to declare independence, which was not securely established until 1821, when Venezuela was a department of the federal republic of Gran Colombia. It gained full independence as a separate country in 1830. During the 19th century, Venezuela suffered political turmoil and autocracy, remaining dominated by regional caudillos (military strongmen) until the mid-20th century.

Since 1958, Venezuela has had a series of democratic governments. However, economic shocks in the 1980s led to several political crises, including the deadly Caracazo riots of 1989, two attempted coups in 1992, and the impeachment of El Presidente Carlos Andrés Pérez in 1993. A collapse in confidence in the existing parties saw the 1998 election of former coup-involved career officer Hugo Chávez and the launch of the Bolivarian Revolution, beginning with a 1999 Constituent Assembly to write a new Constitution of Venezuela. This new constitution officially changed the name of the country to República Bolivariana de Venezuela (Bolivarian Republic of Venezuela). At the same time, the new government of Venezuela started several changes in the internal economy of the country, which resulted in a socioeconomic crisis that began during the rule of Chavez and Nicolás Maduro. The crisis is characterised by hyperinflation, escalating famine, disease, crime, and mortality, leading to massive emigration from the country.

== Pre-Columbian period in Venezuela ==
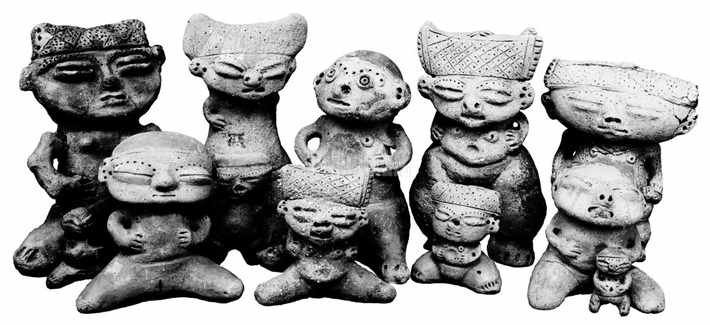
Cult image sculpted in ceramic, Los Roques Archipelago.

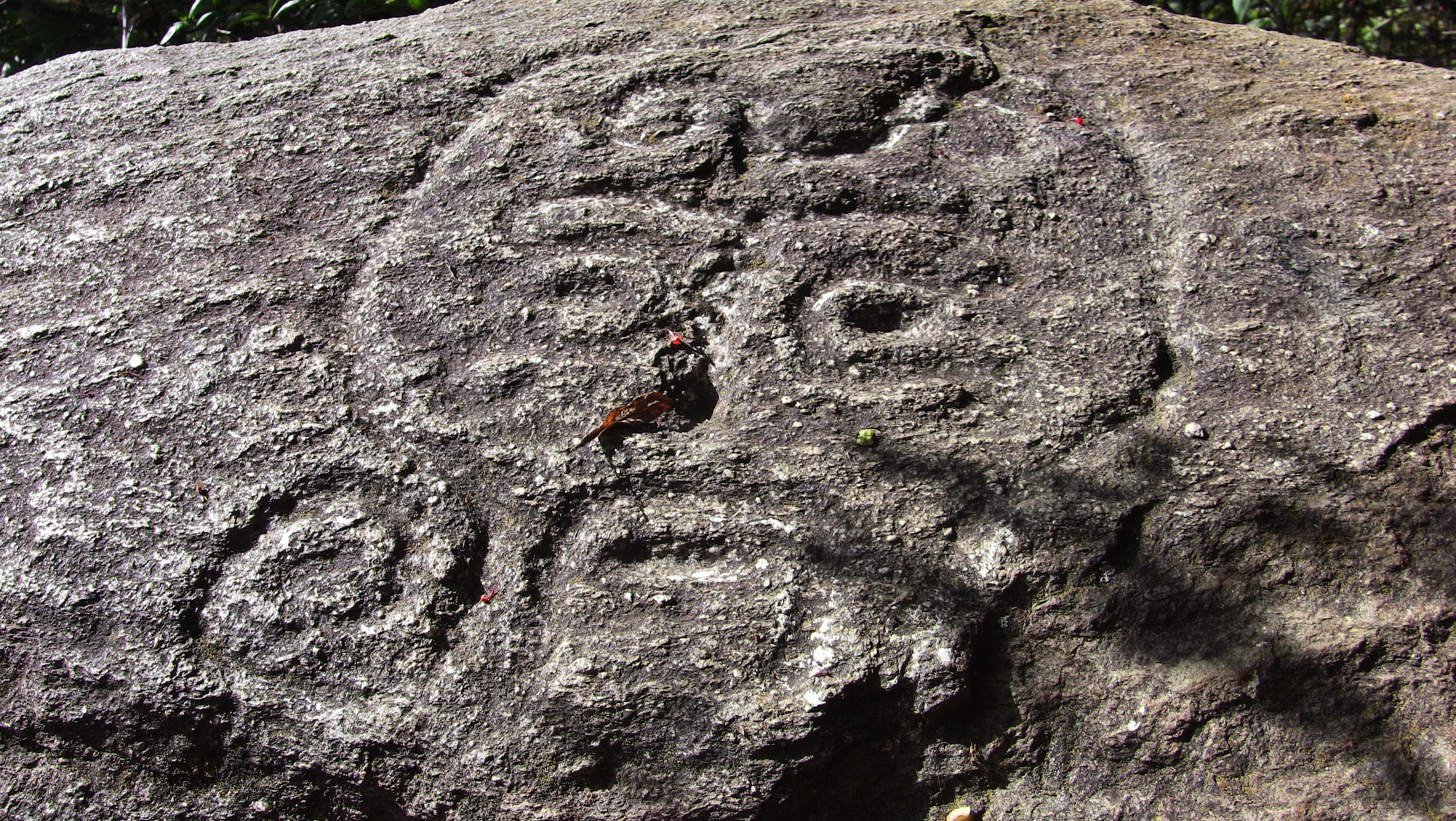
Petroglyph in the Waraira Repano National Park.

Archaeologists have discovered evidence of the earliest known inhabitants of the Venezuelan area in the form of leaf-shaped flake tools, together with chopping and plano-convex scraping implements exposed on the high riverine terraces of the Pedregal River in western Venezuela. Late Pleistocene hunting artifacts, including spear tips, come from a similar site in northwestern Venezuela known as El Jobo. According to radiocarbon dating, these date from 15,000 to 9,000 B.P. Taima-Taima, yellow Muaco, and El Jobo in Falcón are some of the sites that have yielded archaeological material from these times. These groups co-existed with megafauna like megateriums, glyptodonts, and toxodonts. Archaeologists identify a Meso-Indian period from about 9,000–7,000 B.P. to 1000 B.P. In this period, hunters and gatherers of megafauna started to turn to other food sources and established the first tribal structures.

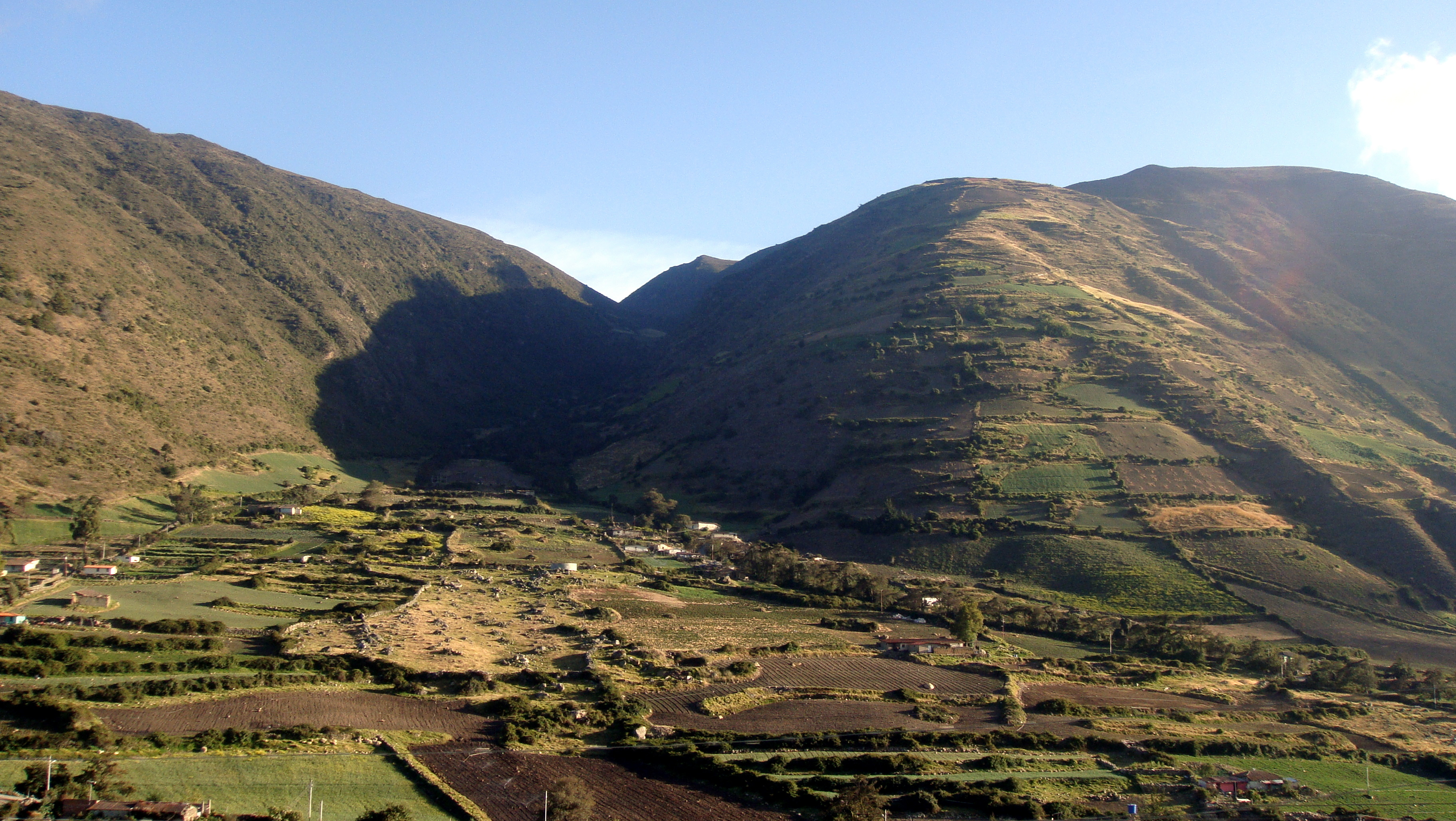
Timoto-Cuica territory in present day Mérida, Venezuela.

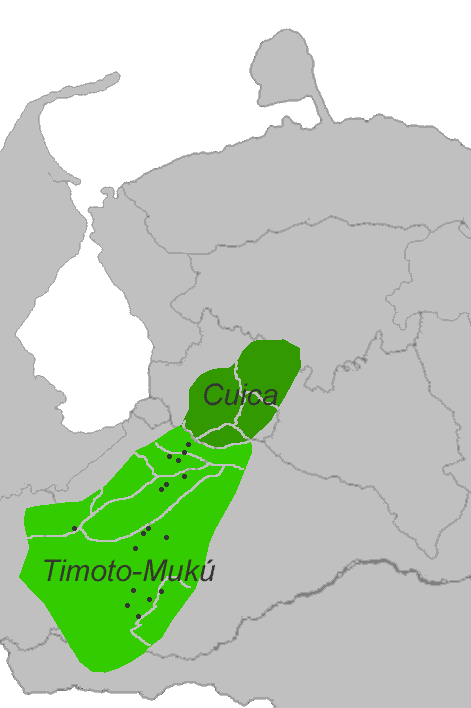
Timoto and Cuica toponyms.

Pre-Columbian Venezuela had an estimated population of one million. In addition to indigenous peoples known today, the population included historic groups such as the Kalina (Caribs), Caquetio, Auaké, Mariche, and Timoto-Cuicas. The Timoto-Cuica culture was the most complex society in Pre-Columbian Venezuela; with pre-planned permanent villages, surrounded by irrigated, terraced fields and with tanks for water storage. Their houses were made primarily of stone and wood with thatched roofs. They were peaceful, for the most part, and depended on growing crops. Regional crops included potatoes and ullucos. They left behind works of art, particularly anthropomorphic ceramics, but no major monuments. They spun vegetable fibers to weave into textiles and mats for housing. They are credited with having invented the arepa, a staple of Venezuelan cuisine.

Beginning around 1,000 AD, archaeologists speak of the Neo-Indian period, which ends with the European Conquest and Colony period. In the 16th century, when Spanish colonization began in Venezuelan territory, the population of several indigenous peoples, such as the Mariches (descendants of the Caribes), declined. Native caciques (leaders), such as Guaicaipuro and Tamanaco, attempted to resist Spanish incursions, but the newcomers ultimately subdued them. Historians agree that the founder of Caracas, Diego de Losada, ultimately put Tamanaco to death.

== Spanish rule ==
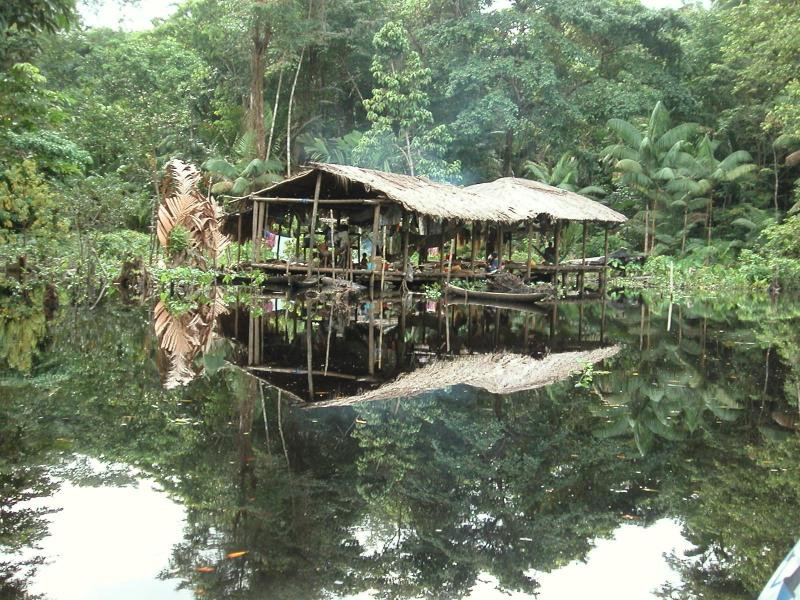
A palafito like the ones seen by Amerigo Vespucci

Christopher Columbus sailed along the eastern coast of Venezuela on his third voyage in 1498 and explored most of the today's Sucre state coast line, the only one of his four voyages to reach the South American mainland. This being the first time that Europeans sighted the continent, Columbus, upon observing the variety of flora and fauna of the Orinoco delta, called the area "Land of Grace", in clear allusion to the biblical Eden. The expedition discovered the so-called "Pearl Islands" of Cubagua and Margarita off the northeastern coast of Venezuela. Later Spanish expeditions returned to exploit these islands' abundant pearl oysters, enslaving the indigenous people of the islands and harvesting the pearls intensively. They became one of the most valuable resources of the incipient Spanish Empire in the Americas between 1508 and 1531, by which time the local indigenous population and the pearl oysters had been devastated.

The second Spanish expedition, led by Alonso de Ojeda, sailing along the length of the northern coast of South America in 1499, gave the name Venezuela ("little Venice" in Spanish) to the Gulf of Venezuela—because of its perceived similarity to the Italian city.

Spain's colonization of mainland Venezuela started in 1502. Spain established its first permanent South American settlement in what became the city of Cumaná. At the time of the Spanish arrival, indigenous people lived mainly in groups as agriculturists and hunters – along the coast, in the Andean mountain range, and along the Orinoco River.

Klein-Venedig (Little Venice) was the most significant part of the German colonization of the Americas, from 1528 to 1546, in which the Augsburg-based Welser banking family obtained colonial rights in the Province of Venezuela in return for debts owed by Charles I of Spain. The primary motivation was the search for the legendary golden city of El Dorado . The venture was led by the first governor Ambrosius Ehinger, who founded Maracaibo in 1529. Upon his arrival to Santa Ana de Coro, Ehinger had appointed Nikolaus Federmann as his deputy. On 30 July 1530 Federmann became responsible for the colony of Klein Venedig. Governor Ehinger temporarily handed over authority to Federmann, because he had to go Hispaniola for health reasons. After the deaths of Ehinger, and then his successor, Georg von Speyer, Philipp von Hutten continued exploration in the interior, and in his absence from the capital of the province, the crown of Spain claimed the right to appoint the governor. Upon Hutten's return to the capital, Santa Ana de Coro, in 1546, the Spanish governor, Juan de Carvajal, had Hutten and Bartholomeus VI. Welser executed. Charles I later revoked Welser's charter.

By the middle of the 16th century, not many more than 2,000 Europeans lived in the region that became Venezuela. The opening of gold mines in 1632 at Yaracuy led to the introduction of slavery, at first involving the indigenous population, then imported Africans. The first real economic success of the colony involved the raising of livestock, much helped by the grassy plains known as Llanos. The society that developed as a result – a handful of Spanish landowners and widely dispersed native herdsmen on Spanish-introduced horses – recalls primitive feudalism, certainly a powerful concept in the 16th-century Spanish imagination that (perhaps more fruitfully) bears comparison in economic terms with the latifundia of antiquity.

During the 16th and 17th centuries, the cities that constitute today's Venezuela suffered relative neglect. The Viceroyalties of New Spain and Peru (located on the sites that had been occupied by the capital cities of the Aztecs and Incas, respectively) showed more interest in their nearby gold and silver mines than in the remote agricultural societies of Venezuela. Responsibility for the Venezuelan territories shifted to and between the two viceroyalties. The Province of Venezuela came under the jurisdiction of the Viceroyalty of New Granada created in 1717 by King Felipe V, as part of a new territorial control policy. It was suspended in 1723 for financial problems and was restored in 1739 until the independence movement suspended it again in 1810.

In the 18th century, a second Venezuelan society formed along the coast with the establishment of cocoa plantations manned by much larger importations of African slaves. Quite a number of black slaves also worked in the haciendas of the grassy llanos. Most of the Amerindians who still survived had perforce migrated to the plains and jungles to the south, where only Spanish friars took an interest in them – especially the Franciscans or Capucins, who compiled grammars and small lexicons for some of their languages. The most important friar misión (the name for an area of friar activity) developed in San Tomé in the Guayana Region. Since 1726 the Real Compañía Guipuzcoana de Caracas held a close monopoly on trade with Europe. The Guipuzcoana company stimulated the Venezuelan economy, especially in fostering the cultivation of cacao beans, which became Venezuela's principal export.

In 1777 the provinces of Venezuela were separated from the Viceroyalty of New Granada by King Charles III and assigned to the Captaincy General of Venezuela. In addition to these core area, the territory included parts of the Viceroyalty as Guyana, Trinidad and Tobago, Maracaibo, southwestern Suriname, parts of northwestern Brazil. It opened Venezuelan ports to foreign commerce, but this recognized a fait accompli. Like no other Spanish American dependency, Venezuela had more contacts with Europe through the British, Dutch and French islands in the Caribbean. In an almost surreptitious, though legal, manner, Caracas had become an intellectual powerhouse. From 1721, it had its own university, which taught Latin, medicine, and engineering, apart from the humanities. Its most illustrious graduate, Andrés Bello, became the greatest Spanish American polymath of his time. In Chacao, a town to the east of Caracas, there flourished a school of music whose director José Ángel Lamas produced a few but impressive compositions according with the strictest 18th-century European canons. Later on, the development of the education system is one of the reasons why distribution began to improve.

== Venezuelan independence ==
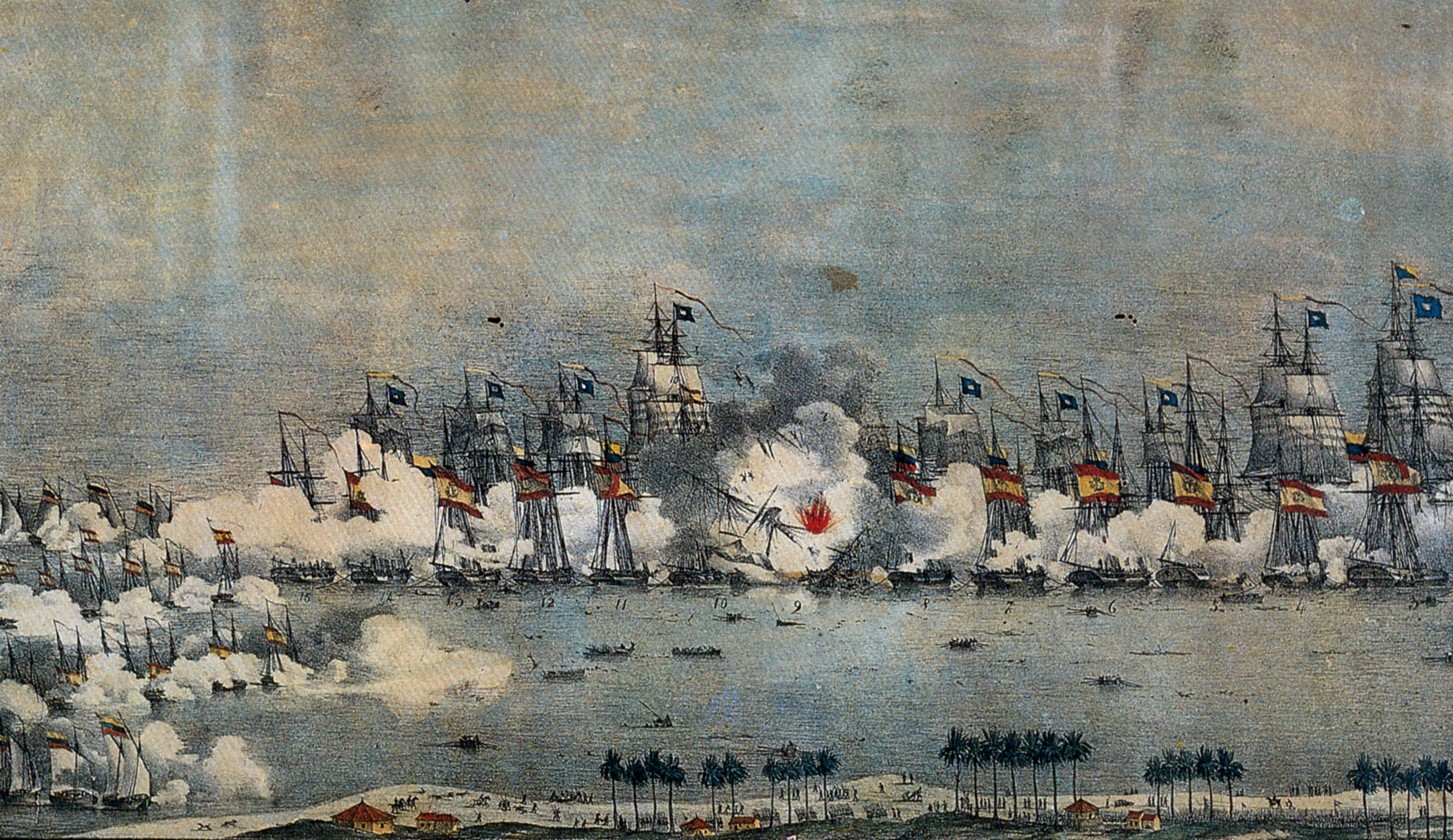
Battle of Lake Maracaibo in 1823 resulted in the final expulsion of the Spanish from Gran Colombia

Word of Spain's troubles in 1808 in the Napoleonic Wars soon reached Caracas, but only on 19 April 1810 did its "cabildo" (city council) decide to follow the example set by the Spanish provinces two years earlier. On 5 July 1811, seven of the ten provinces of the Captaincy General of Venezuela declared their independence in the Venezuelan Declaration of Independence. The First Republic of Venezuela was lost in 1812 following the 1812 Caracas earthquake and the Battle of La Victoria (1812). Simón Bolívar led an "Admirable Campaign" to retake Venezuela, establishing the Second Republic of Venezuela in 1813; but this did not last either, falling to a combination of a local uprising and Spanish royalist reconquest. Only as part of Bolívar's campaign to liberate New Granada in 1819–20 did Venezuela achieve a lasting independence from Spain (initially as part of Gran Colombia).

On 17 December 1819, the Congress of Angostura declared Gran Colombia an independent country. After two more years of war, the country achieved independence from Spain in 1821 under the leadership of its most famous son, Simón Bolívar. Venezuela, along with the present-day countries of Colombia, Panama, and Ecuador, formed part of the Republic of Gran Colombia until 1830, when Venezuela became a separate sovereign country.

=== The First Republic ===
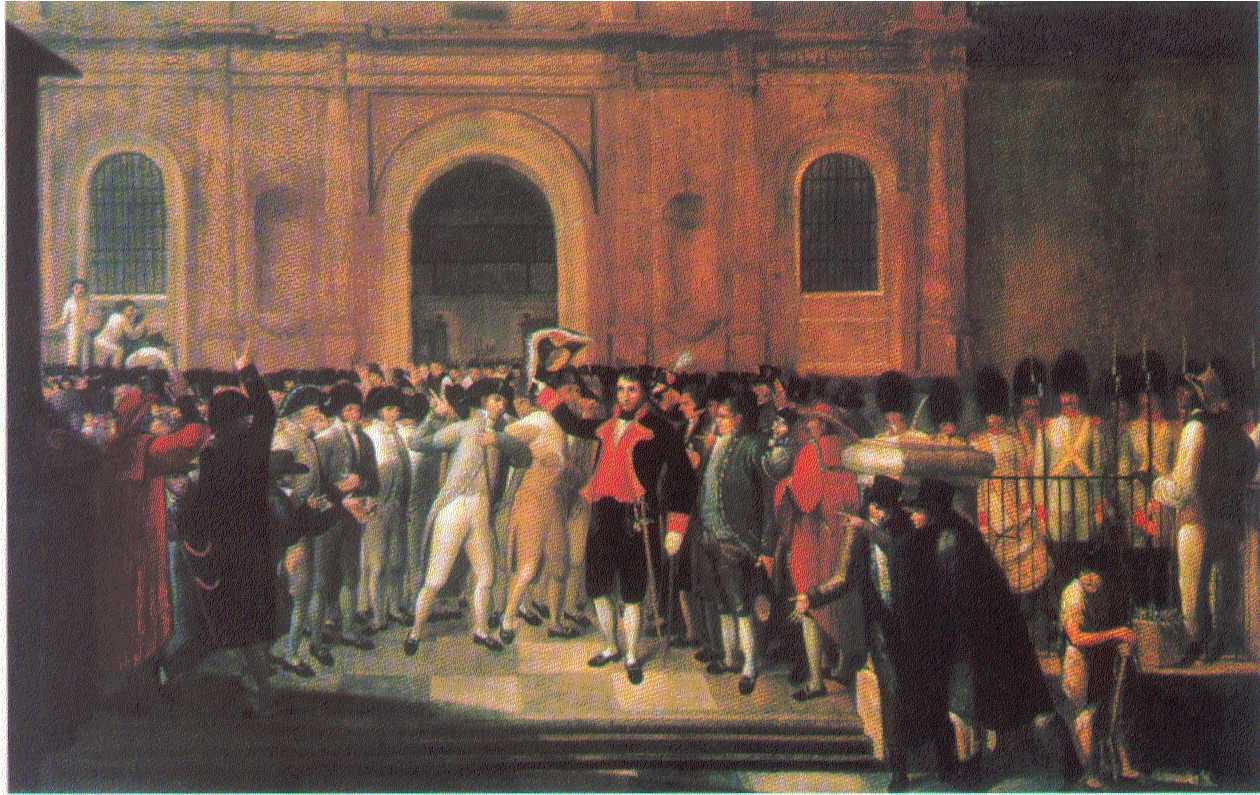
19 April 1810. Painting by Juan Lovera (1835)

Some Venezuelans began to grow resistant to colonial control towards the end of the eighteenth century. Spain's neglect of its Venezuelan colony contributed to Venezuelan intellectuals' increased zeal for learning. The colony had more external sources of information than other more "important" Spanish dependencies, not excluding the viceroyalties, although one should not belabor this point, for only the mantuanos (a Venezuelan name for the white Creole elite) had access to a solid education. (Another name for the mantuanos class, grandes cacaos, reflected the source of their wealth. To this day, in Venezuela the term can apply to a presumptuous person.) The mantuanos showed themselves presumptuous, overbearing, and zealous in affirming their privileges against the pardo (mixed-race) majority of the population.

The first organized conspiracy against the colonial regime in Venezuela occurred in 1797, organized by Manuel Gual and José María España. It took direct inspiration from the French Revolution, but was put down with the collaboration of the "mantuanos" because it promoted radical social changes.

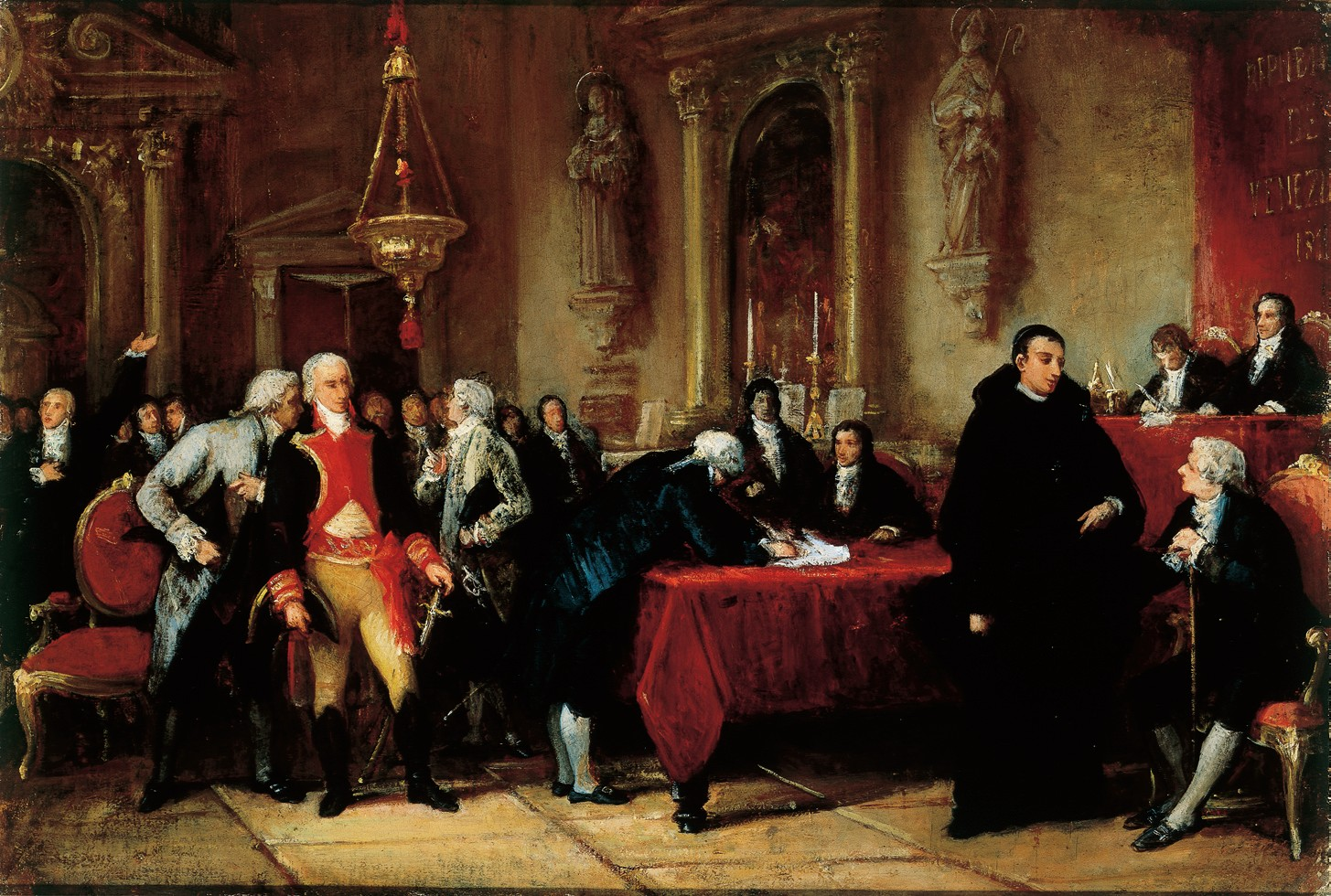
5 July 1811. Painting by Martín Tovar y Tovar

European events sowed the seeds of Venezuela's declaration of independence. The Napoleonic Wars in Europe not only weakened Spain's imperial power but also put Britain (unofficially) on the side of the independence movement. After the signing of the Treaty of Fontainebleau (1807) in May 1808, Napoleon demanded and received the abdication of Ferdinand VII of Spain and the confirmation of the abdication of Ferdinand's father Charles IV. Napoleon then appointed as King of Spain his own brother Joseph Bonaparte. That marked the beginning of Spain's own War of Independence from French hegemony and partial occupation before the Spanish American wars of independence even began. The focal point of Spanish political resistance, the Supreme Central Junta, was formed to govern in the name of Ferdinand VII prisoner of Napoleon in Bayonne since May 1808.

The first major defeat that Napoleonic France suffered occurred at the Battle of Bailén in Andalusia (July 1808). Despite this Spanish victory, the French soon regained the initiative and advanced into southern Spain. The Spanish government had to retreat to the island redoubt of Cádiz. Here, the Supreme Central Junta dissolved itself and set up a five-person regency to handle the affairs of state until the deputies of the Cortes of Cádiz could convene.

Word of Spain's troubles in 1808 in the Napoleonic Wars soon reached La Guaira on July 14, aboard the French Brig Serpent. Two days after, a movement broke out in Caracas led by Mantuanos against Captain General Juan de Casas. These Mantuanos constituted the most powerful economic-social class of the city, led an attempt to establish a Government Junta that regulated the destiny of the General Captaincy of Venezuela following the invasion of Spain by Napoleon Bonaparte in absence of the King Ferdinand. That same night the militias began the arrests of the signatories of the junta petition, some of whom were imprisoned, others were confined to their farms or exilated to Spain, and a minor quantity were released after some time. Thus the conspiracy ended. After, but only on 19 April 1810, did its "cabildo" (city council) decide to follow the example set by the Spanish provinces two years earlier. Other provincial capitals — Barcelona, Cumaná, Mérida, and Trujillo among them – followed suit. Although the new Junta of Caracas had self-appointed elite members who claimed to represent the pardos (free blacks and even slaves), the new government eventually faced the challenge of maintaining the alliance with the pardos. Given recent history these groups still had grievances against the mantuanos. A segment of the Mantuanos (among them 27-year-old Simón Bolívar, the future Liberator) saw the setting up of the Junta as a step towards outright independence. On 5 July 1811, seven of the ten provinces of the Captaincy General of Venezuela declared their independence in the Venezuelan Declaration of Independence.

The Venezuelan War of Independence ensued. It ran concurrently with that of New Granada. The First Republic of Venezuela was lost in 1812 following the 1812 Caracas earthquake and the Battle of La Victoria.

=== The campaign of 1813 and the Second Republic ===
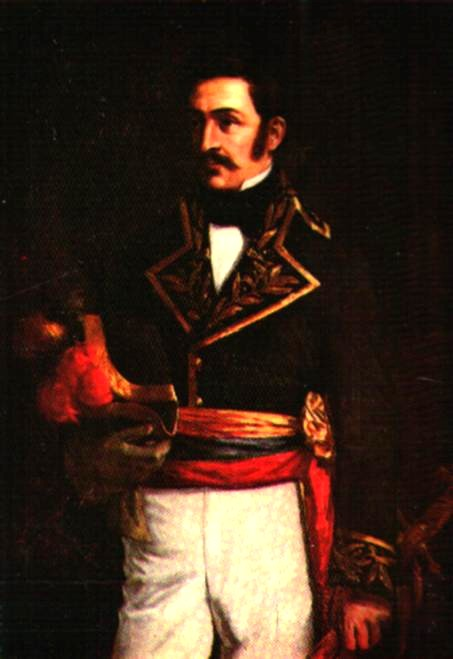
José Félix Ribas

Bolívar arrived in Cartagena and was well received, as he was later in Bogotá, where he joined the army of the United Provinces of New Granada. He recruited a force and invaded Venezuela from the southwest by crossing the Andes (1813). His chief lieutenant was the headstrong José Félix Ribas. In Trujillo, an Andean province, Bolívar emitted his infamous Decree of War to the Death with which he hoped to get the pardos and any mantuano who was having second thoughts on his side. At the time that Bolívar was victorious in the west, Santiago Mariño and Manuel Piar, a pardo from the Dutch island of Curaçao, were successfully fighting royalists in eastern Venezuela. Quickly losing ground (much as Miranda had a year earlier) Monteverde took refuge in Puerto Cabello, and Bolívar occupied Caracas, re-establishing the Republic on 6 August 1813, with two "states", one in the west headed by Bolívar and one in the east headed by Mariño. But neither the successful invasions nor Bolívar's decree were provoking a massive enrollment of pardos in the cause of independence. Rather it was the other way around. In the Llanos a populist Spanish immigrant caudillo, José Tomás Boves, initiated a widespread pardo movement against the restored Republic. Bolívar and Ribas held and defended the mantuano-controlled center of Venezuela. In the east, the royalists started recovering territory. After suffering a setback, Mariño and Bolívar joined their forces, but they were defeated by Boves in 1814. Republicans were forced to evacuate Caracas and flee to the east, where, in the port of Carúpano, Piar was still holding out. Piar, however, did not accept Bolívar's supreme command, and once again in 1815 Bolívar left Venezuela and went to New Granada.

=== Gran Colombia and Bolívar's campaign to liberate New Granada ===
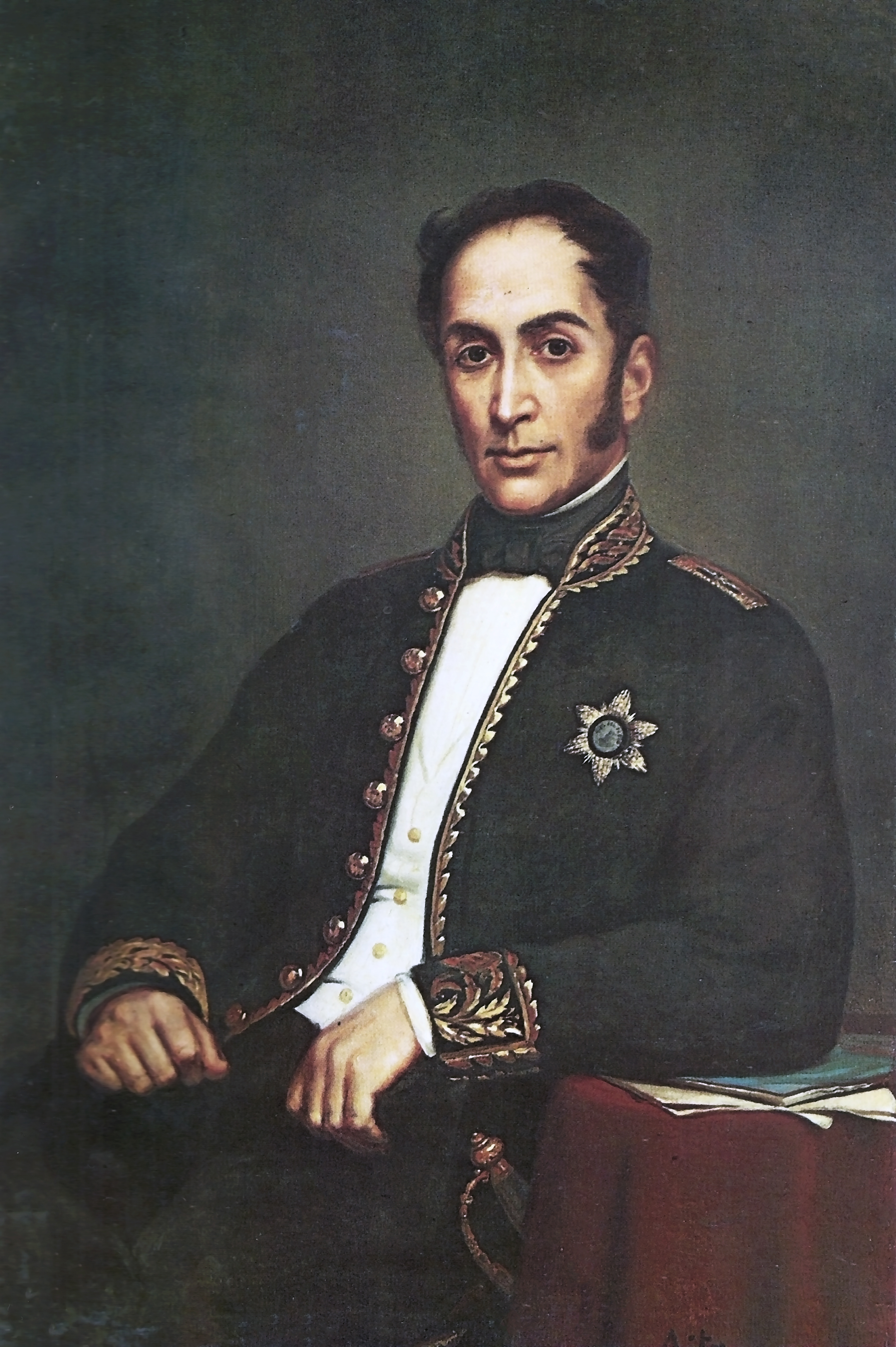
Simón Bolívar

In Spain in 1820, liberal sections of the military under Rafael del Riego established a constitutional monarchy, which precluded new Spanish invasions of America. Before his recall to Spain, Morillo signed a truce with Bolívar. Morillo left Miguel de la Torre in command of the royalist forces.

The truce ended in 1821 and in Bolívar's campaign to liberate New Granada, Bolívar had all available forces converge on Carabobo, a hilly plain near Valencia, to face de la Torre and Morales. The defeat of the Spanish right in the Battle of Carabobo, which is credited to the British Legions whose commander Thomas Farriar fell, decided the battle. The general Morales with the remnants of the royalists tried to resist in Puerto Cabello. After Carabobo, a congress met in Cúcuta, Santander's birthplace, and approved a federalist constitution for Gran Colombia. Subsequent battles included a key naval victory for the independence forces on 24 July 1823 at the Battle of Lake Maracaibo and in November 1823 José Antonio Páez occupied Puerto Cabello, the last Royalist stronghold in Venezuela.

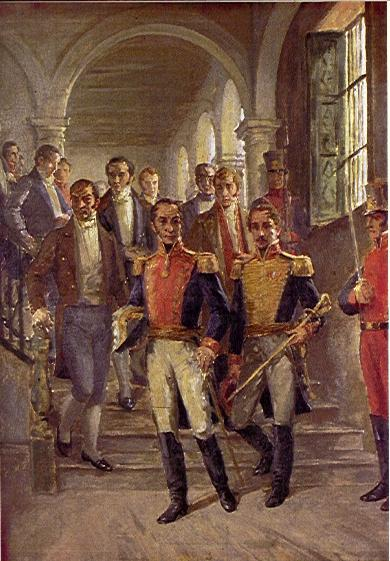
Simón Bolívar and Francisco Santander at the Congress of Cúcuta. Painting by Ricardo Acevedo Bernal

=== Independence from Gran Colombia ===
==== La Cosiata ====
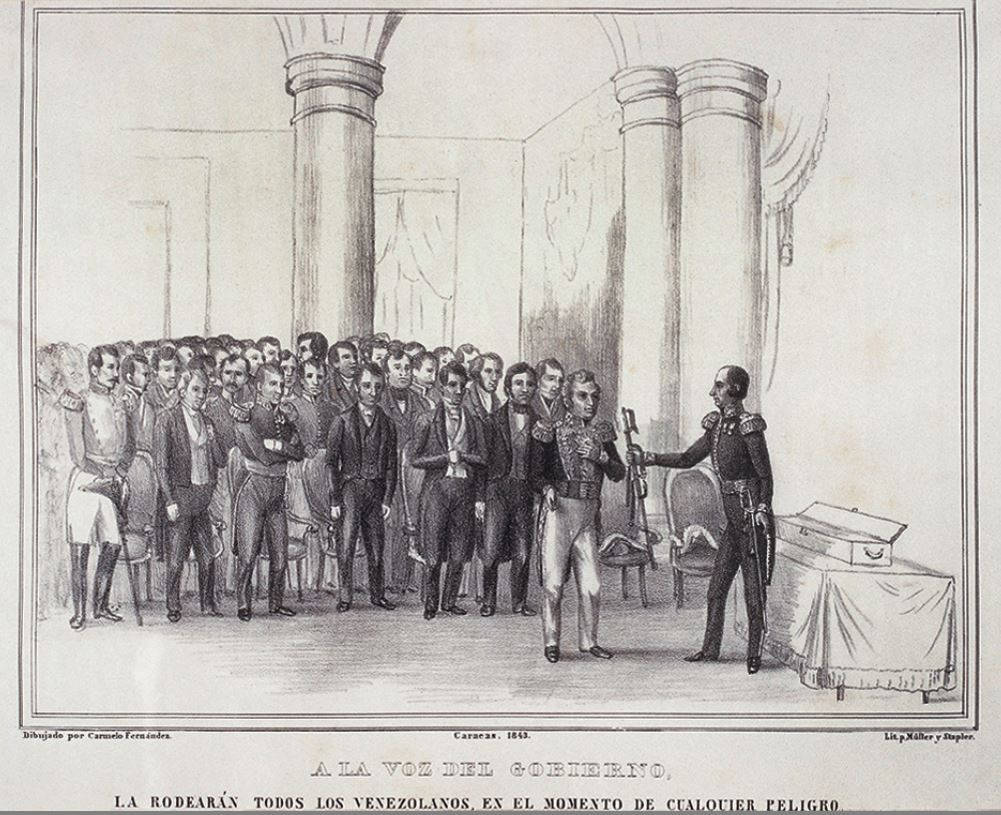
José Antonio Páez receives from Carlos Soublette the Sword of Honor on 19 March 1843

In April 1826, Páez was severely criticized for his methods of conscription. Locals attempted to have him removed, but Páez claimed to be acting within his orders. The central government decided to hold a trial.

Páez was initially willing to go, but with backing from some in Valencia and Caracas the general changed his mind and decided to neither submit to trial nor relinquish his post. Páez and his supporters were willing to have Bolívar as supreme leader, but they were reluctant to follow Santander. While they wanted changes to be made to the constitution, they initially wanted to do it under Bolívar as part of the Gran Colombia. Páez wrote to Bolívar, asking him to come back to take charge and solve the imbroglio. Santander declared Páez to be in open rebellion against the central government. Páez initially stated that he would wait for Bolívar to return before making any changes in Venezuela, but eventually started suppressing the press, modifying tariff enforcement, and conscription enforcement before Bolívar was able to return. Venezuela's political unity fractured as ties to Santander, Páez, and Bolívar conflicted. Páez began to fight a civil conflict with various factions in Venezuela in which few died.

Bolívar, finally returned from his campaigns in the south, took command of the executive towards the end of 1826. He assumed the extraordinary powers granted to him by the Congress. Conflicting letters between Santander and Bolívar, and Bolívar and Páez, created a degree of uncertainty as to what he would do. Páez demanded a general amnesty for himself and his supporters which Bolívar granted in return for reestablishing control over Venezuela.

Páez welcomed Bolívar and accepted his authority, and Bolívar named him Supreme Civil and Military Commander of Venezuela. This action confused and disappointed both Santander in Bogotá and the few local officials in Venezuela who had not supported the La Cosiata. They were removed or transferred to other posts while those who had backed Páez remained or were promoted.

Until La Cosiata, Páez had been mostly respected as a result of his military successes during the war. From that time, he started to be seen as a politician with the power and the wit needed to pursue and defend any changes, or lack thereof, made under the constitutional order. Páez came out from La Cosiata with more power than he had before.

In 1828, in view of the political opposition he faced, both in Venezuela and in New Granada, and because his Great Colombia had started to disintegrate, Bolívar named himself dictator. He escaped an assassination attempt with the help of his mistress, Manuela Saenz, a pardo woman from Quito. Santander was exiled, but Jose Prudencio Padilla, the pardo general who had helped corner Morales after Carabobo in the Battle of Maracaibo Lake, was executed for treason. The emboldened Peruvians invaded Guayaquil. Bolívar had to return to Quito in 1829 to repulse them, which didn't take much doing, for the invasion had petered out before Bolívar arrived. Back in Bogotá, Bolívar pleaded for unity and, though he had offered to resign various times during his career, this time, when Great Colombia had a new constitution (not Bolívar's one) and a president, Joaquin Mosquera, Bolívar finally did resign in 1830. At that point, Páez not only had declared the second independence of Venezuela but also had promoted a campaign of vituperation against Bolívar. Seeing the state of things, Quito followed suit under Venezuelan general Juan José Flores, and Antonio José de Sucre was assassinated while riding alone through a thick forest on his way to that city. A downcast Bolívar rode to the coast with the intention of leaving the country, but he was exhausted and very sick. He died near Santa Marta in Colombia at the age of 47.

== 1830–1908 ==
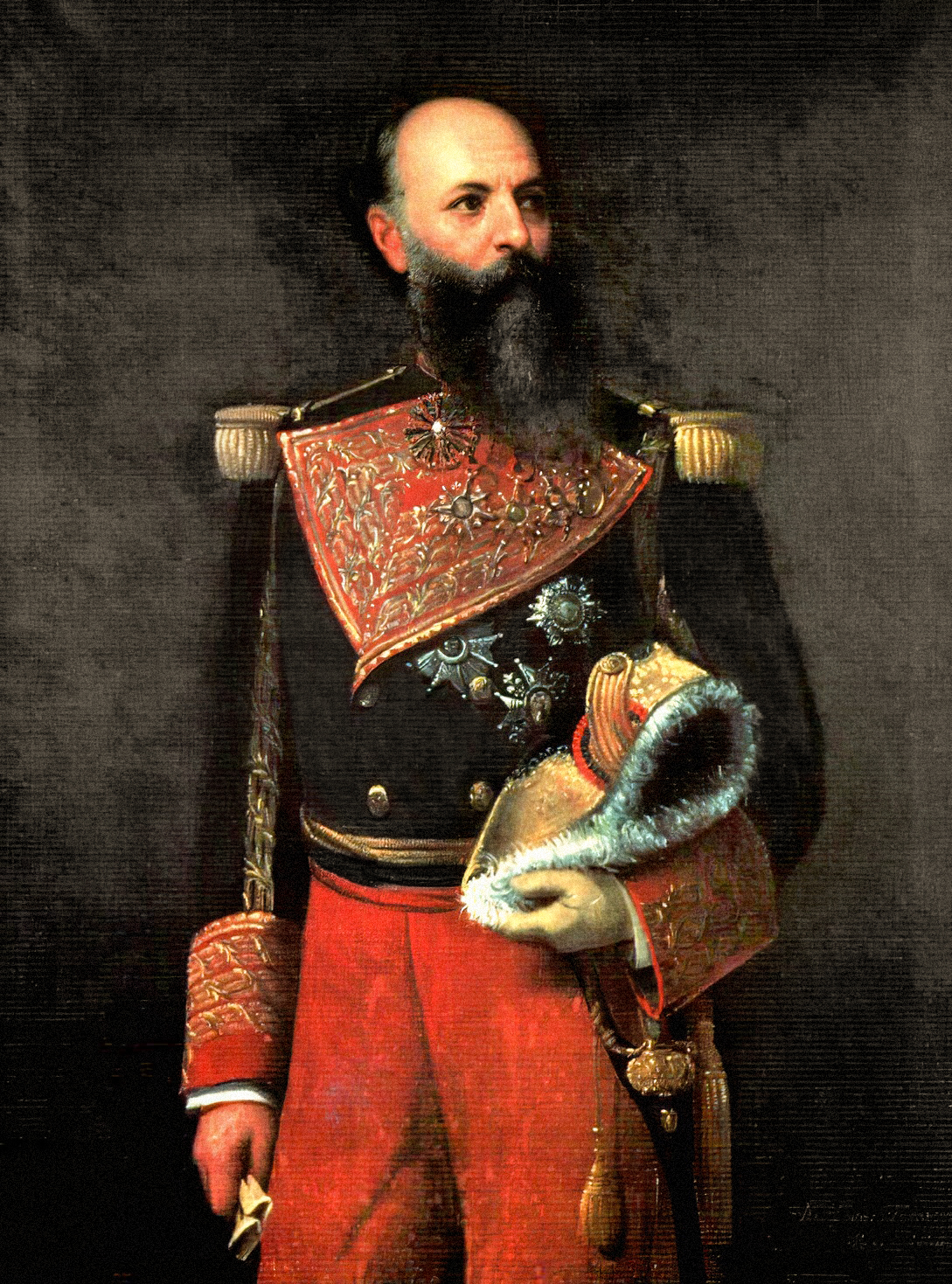
Antonio Guzmán Blanco, painting by Martín Tovar y Tovar in 1880

Following the Venezuelan War of Independence (part of the Spanish American wars of independence), Venezuela initially won independence from the Spanish Empire as part of Gran Colombia. Internal tensions led to the dissolution of Gran Colombia in 1830–31, with Venezuela declaring independence in 1831. For the rest of the nineteenth century, independent Venezuela saw a range of caudillos (strongmen) compete for power. Leading political figures include José Antonio Páez, Antonio Guzmán Blanco and Cipriano Castro.

In a succession of rebellions, the Federal War was particularly bloody and saw the establishment of the modern system of States of Venezuela (replacing the Provinces of Venezuela largely inherited from the colonial era). The start of the 20th century saw several notable international crises: the Venezuela Crisis of 1895 under Joaquín Crespo (a territorial dispute with Britain) and the Venezuela Crisis of 1902–1903 (Venezuela's refusal to pay foreign debts) under Cipriano Castro.

== 1908–1958 ==
=== Juan Vicente Gómez (1908–1935) ===
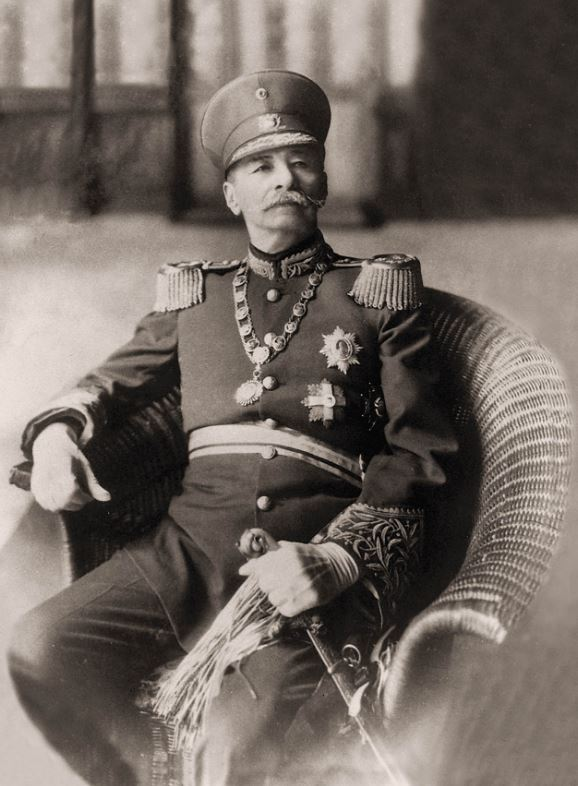
Juan Vicente Gómez

In 1908, President Cipriano Castro was too sick to be cured in Venezuela and he left for Germany leaving Juan Vicente Gómez in charge. Castro had not gone further than the outer Antilles when Gómez took over the government and forbade Castro from returning.

One of Gómez's first measures was to start canceling outstanding Venezuelan international debts, a goal which was soon achieved. Under Gómez, Venezuela acquired all the appurtenances of a regular national army staffed and officered almost entirely by Andeans. At the time, the country had a widespread telegraphic system. Under these circumstances, the possibility of caudillo uprisings was curtailed. The only armed threat against Gómez came from a disaffected former business partner to whom he had given a monopoly on all maritime and riverine commerce. The man who had tried to overthrow him, Román Delgado Chalbaud, spent fourteen years in jail. He later claimed that he was in ball and chains during all that time, but he was released by Gómez. His son, Carlos Delgado Chalbaud, would later become president of Venezuela. When university students staged a street demonstration in 1928 (Generation of 1928), they were arrested but were soon released. But Gómez was indeed ruthless in throttling all opposition and he allowed a personality cult, but this was as much his doing as that of his sycophants, who were numerous all over Venezuela. Gómez, unlike Guzmán Blanco, never erected a statue of himself anywhere in Venezuela. He was a stickler for legal formalisms, which in essence meant that he introduced new constitutions any time it suited his political ends, although this was also the rule during the 19th century. During his dictatorship, Gómez appointed two figurehead presidents while he kept a tight hold on the armed forces from Maracay, his favorite city, west of Caracas, which he embellished and made the main Venezuelan garrison, a status which it retained until at least the 1960s.

==== The discovery of oil ====
Venezuela had large petroleum deposits, the petroleum oozed out from seeps all over the country and an asphalt lake had formed naturally. Venezuelans themselves had tried to extract oil for a small hand-pumped refinery early in the 20th century. When word spread internationally of Venezuela's oil potential, representatives of large foreign companies came to the country and started lobbying for rights of exploration and exploitation, and Gómez established the concessionary system. Venezuela had inherited from Spain the law that the ground surface—presumably, as deep as a plow or a water well went—could belong to individuals but everything under the soil was state property. Thus, Gómez began to grant huge concessions to family and friends. Any one who was close to Gómez eventually would become rich in one way or another. Gómez himself accumulated immense expanses of grasslands for cattle-raising, which had been his original occupation and was a lifelong passion. The Venezuelan concessionaires leased or sold their holdings to the highest foreign bidders. Gómez, who didn't trust industrial workers or unions, refused to allow the oil companies to build refineries on Venezuelan soil, so these were built them in the Dutch islands of Aruba and Curaçao. The one in Aruba was for a time the second largest in the world, after the one in Abadan, Iran. Although the Venezuelan oil boom started around 1918, the year when oil first figured as an export commodity, it took off when an oil well called Barroso blew a 200-foot (60 m) spout that threw up an average of the equivalent to 100,000 barrels a day. It took five days to bring the flow under control. By 1927, oil was Venezuela's most valuable export and by 1929 Venezuela exported more oil than any other country in the world.

It has been said that Gómez did not tax the oil companies and that Venezuela did not benefit from oil production, but this is only a half-truth. The Venezuelan government derived considerable income from the concessions and from taxes of one sort of another, but the original fiscal laws which applied to the oil companies were hammered out between the government and American lawyers. The laws were relatively lenient, but Gómez, who had an acute business sense, understood that it was necessary to create incentives for investors in the Venezuelan oil fields, some of which were very accessible but others were deep in jungles. Oil income allowed Gómez to expand Venezuela's rudimentary infrastructure and the overall impact of the oil industry on Venezuela was a modernizing trend in the areas where it operated. But in a wider sense, the Venezuelan people, except for those who worked for the oil companies and lived badly but had a steady income, benefited little or not all from the country's oil riches.

Gómez took power in a very poor illiterate country. The white/pardos social divide was still very much in place. When Gómez died in his bed in 1935, Venezuela was still a poor illiterate country and if anything the social stratification had been accentuated. The population had grown from perhaps one million and a half to two million. Malaria was the greatest killer. Gómez himself probably had Amerindian ancestry, but he was overtly racist and he was much influenced by a historian, Laureano Vallenilla Lanz, who published a book claiming that the Venezuelan War of Independence was really a civil war with the added argument that pardos were a menace to public order and Venezuela could only subsist as a nation ruled by white strongmen. Gómez, for instance, prohibited all immigration from black Caribbean islands. Even though Venezuela's population in his time was 80% pardo, passports, which were first issued under Gómez, identified carriers by the color of skin, which they still did until the 1980s. Venezuela did change considerably under Gómez. It had radio stations in all the important cities. There existed an incipient middle class. But it still had only two or three universities. An estimated 90% of families formed through common-law marriages. The social progress that did take place was through a spontaneous trend towards modernization in which oil played the central role.

=== López Contreras and Medina Angarita (1935–1945) ===
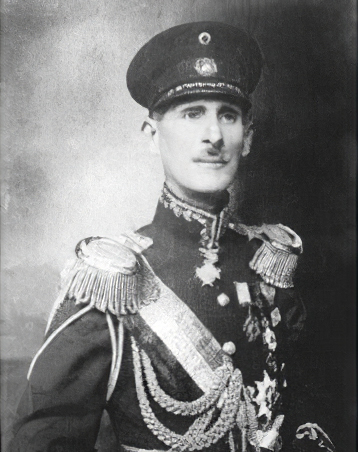
Eleazar López Contreras

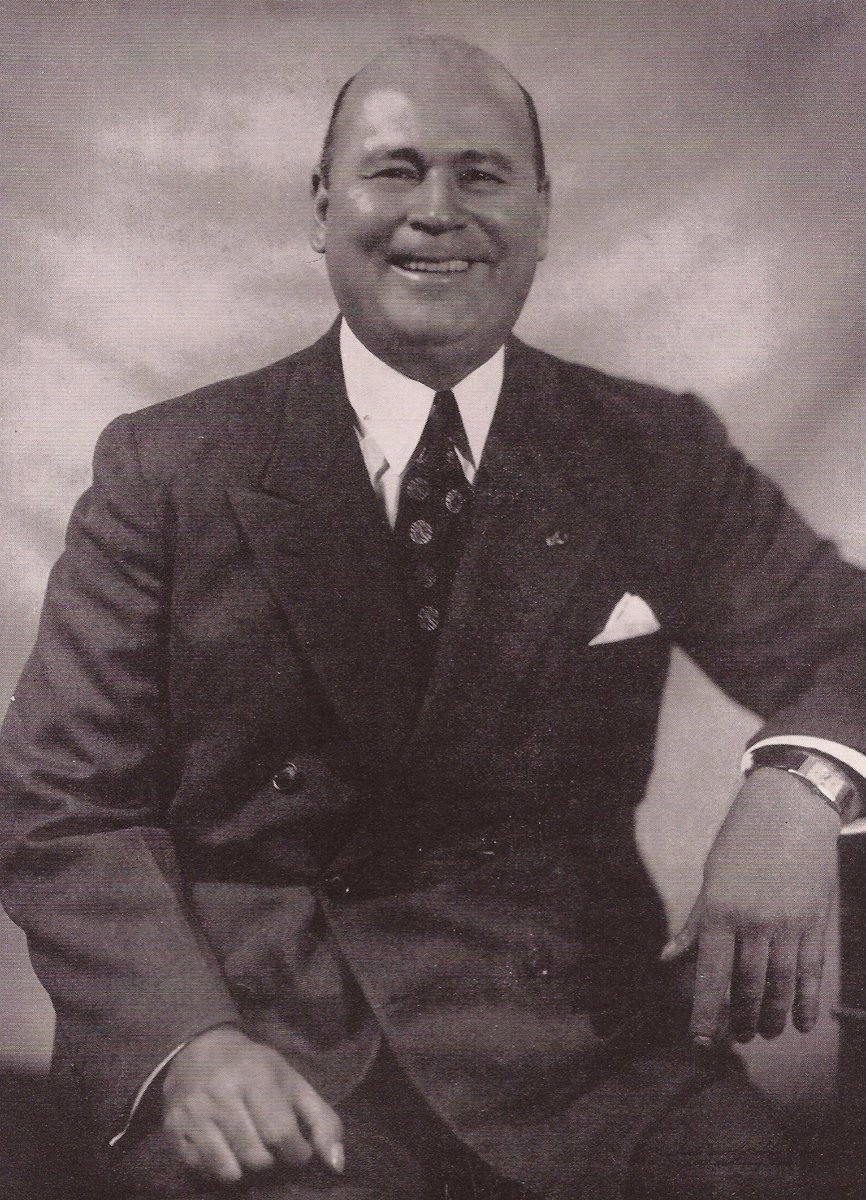
Isaías Medina Angarita

Gómez's minister of war, Eleazar López Contreras, succeeded him: a tall, thin, disciplined soldier with a solid education. Before arriving at his post, he served the Gomecista government loyally wherever he was sent, including at one time Venezuela's eastern land's end, a village called Cristobal Colón, across from Trinidad. In power, López Contreras allowed the pardo masses to vent for a few days before clamping down. He had Gómez's properties confiscated by the state, but the dictator's relatives, with some exceptions who left the country, were not harassed. Gómez never married but he had various illegitimate children. Initially, López Contreras permitted political parties to come into the open, but they tended to become rambunctious and he proscribed them, although he did not use strong repressive means (which weren't necessary anyway) as the politicians that led them, called in Venezuelan historiography the "1928 Generation", did not yet have large popular followings. One of the reasons for this hard stance was that, during his first year as president, López Contreras was faced with a labor strike which paralyzed the oil industry in Zulia state in western Venezuela, whose capital was Maracaibo, where the most productive fields were located.

López Contreras had created a labor ministry and his representative there, Carlos Ramírez MacGregor, received orders to make a report of the situation, which confirmed the workers' grievances. He also had instructions to declare the strike illegal, (which he did). Government forces made the workers return to their jobs, although after that incident the oil companies did start taking serious initiatives to improve conditions for Venezuelan workers. Among the notable goals of López Contreras was a campaign to eradicate malaria in the llanos. This task was finally accomplished during the following presidency through the use of DDT.

Two communists led the oil strike: Rodolfo Quintero and the oil worker Jesús Faría. The history of Marxism in Venezuela is rather complex, but a brief overview is that communism never sunk roots in Venezuela and its impact on mainstream politics was minimal. López Contreras tried to create a political movement called Cruzadas Cívicas Bolivarianas (Civic Bolivarian Crusades), but it did not pan out, for whatever he did had the taint of his background as a pillar of the Gómez regime. Even the name "crusades" was suspect with its clerical overtones. Constitutionally, López Contreras finished Gómez's last term and in 1936 he was elected by the docile congress for the term ending in 1941.

After a vote in the same congress for the 1941–1946 term, López Contreras handed power to his war minister and personal friend, the Andean general Isaías Medina Angarita, who in many ways made a strong foil to his predecessor. He was stout and good natured and did not make excessive demands on himself. Medina Angarita legalized all political parties, including the divided communists: some were hard-line, such as the Machado brothers of a traditional Caracas family; and others, gradualists or conciliatory, led by Luis Miquilena, a union leader who supported Medina's step-by-step approach and for a time was allied to one of the Machado brothers. Under Medina there was an indirect democracy, which followed the 19th century custom of elections at the municipal council level. But Medina was committed to a still restricted but wider national democratic election. For that he had officialdom in all the Venezuelan states form a pro-government party named Partido Democratico Venezolana or PDV (Venezuelan Democratic Party). But the real genius at political organization was Rómulo Betancourt, who created from the bottom up what was in effect a pardo party with a strongly reformist, but not Marxist, agenda.

=== El Trienio Adeco (1945–1948) ===
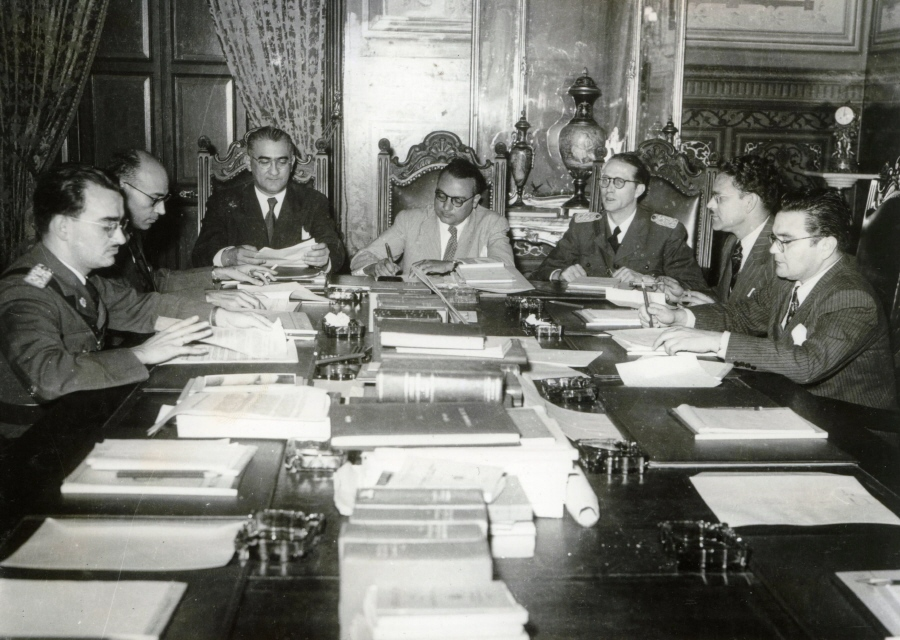
Members of the Revolutionary Government Junta, from left to right: Mario Ricardo Vargas, Raúl Leoni, Valmore Rodríguez, Rómulo Betancourt, Carlos Delgado Chalbaud, Edmundo Fernández and Gonzalo Barrios. Miraflores Palace, 1945

El Trienio Adeco was a three-year period in Venezuelan history, from 1945 to 1948, under the government of the popular party Democratic Action (Accion Democratica, its adherents adecos). The party gained office via the 1945 Venezuelan coup d'état against President Isaías Medina Angarita and held the first elections with universal suffrage in Venezuelan history. The 1947 Venezuelan general election saw Democratic Action formally elected to office, but it was removed from office shortly after in the 1948 Venezuelan coup d'état.

There was no particular incident that set off the bloodless 1948 coup, which was led by Carlos Delgado Chalbaud. There was no popular opposition. This might have meant that the odds were too great or that the general populace had not noticed any particular improvement in their lives despite the incessant government propaganda. All prominent adecos were expelled. The other parties were allowed but muzzled.

=== 1948–1958 ===
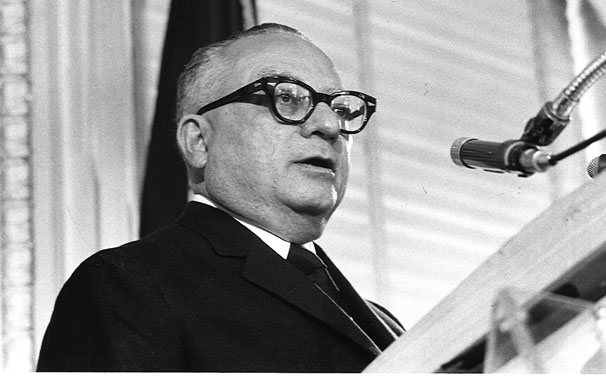
Rómulo Betancourt

Venezuela saw ten years of military dictatorship from 1948 to 1958. After the 1948 Venezuelan coup d'état brought an end to the three-year experiment in democracy ("El Trienio Adeco"), a triumvirate of military personnel controlled the government until 1952, when it held presidential elections. These were free enough to produce results unacceptable to the government, leading them to be falsified and to one of the three leaders, Marcos Pérez Jiménez, assuming the presidency. His government was brought to an end by the 1958 Venezuelan coup d'état, which saw the advent of democracy with a transitional government under Admiral Wolfgang Larrazábal in place until the December 1958 elections. Prior to the elections, three of the main political parties (with the notable exclusion of the Communist Party of Venezuela) signed up to the Punto Fijo Pact power-transition agreement.

== 1958–1999 ==
=== Second Andrés Pérez administration ===
Serving as president from 1974 to 1979, Carlos Andrés Pérez proved less generous with hand-outs than previously. Despite initially rejecting liberalization policies, his economic agenda was later focused on cutting subsidies, privatizations, and legislation to attract foreign investment. Naím began at the lowest rung of economic liberalization, which was freeing controls on prices and a ten percent increase in that of gasoline, which in Venezuela is sacrosanctly very low. The increase in petrol price fed into a 30 percent increase in fares for public transport In February 1989, barely into his second term, Pérez faced a series of widespread protests and lootings, which started in Guarenas and later spread to Caracas, known as El Caracazo. The response resulted in the declaration of a state of emergency and led to a large number of deaths, ranging from the official estimate of 277 dead to over 2000.

The MBR officers started plotting seriously, and on 4 February 1992, they struck. Chávez was a lieutenant-colonel, but generals were involved in the coup attempt. They saw as their first priority the capture Pérez, who had recently returned from a junket. They almost had him cornered in the presidential palace, but he managed to escape to the presidential residence and from there he got loyal troops to corner Chávez in turn and to arrest him. In exchange for prompting his co-conspirators to lay down their arms, Chávez, fully uniformed and unbowed, gained permission to speak on television to the entire nation. This led to quite some discussion after he said his objectives had not yet been reached. Several civilians and military were killed during the uprising.

On 27 November 1992, officers of higher rank than Chávez tried to overthrow Pérez, but on this occasion the authorities suppressed the conspiracy easily. Pérez's downfall came when a legal process was begun to force him to reveal how he had used a secret but legal presidential fund, which he resolutely resisted. With the supreme court and congress ranged against him, Pérez was imprisoned – for a while in a detention center, then later under house arrest. In 1993, Pérez handed over the presidency to Ramón J. Velásquez, an adeco politician/historian who had been his presidential secretary. Though nobody has charged Velásquez with corruption, his son became involved in an illegal pardon for drug traffickers but was not charged. Velázquez oversaw the elections of 1993, and these were at once familiar and unique.

=== Second Caldera administration ===
Caldera, who had been candidate for the presidency six times and won once, wanted another go, but COPEI resisted, led by Herrera Campins, and Caldera founded his own brand-new political movement, called Convergencia. COPEI chose a mediocrity from within its ranks. The adecos chose Claudio Fermín. Petkoff had seen the futility of trying again and backed Caldera. Even Velázquez got into the act. When the returns were in, Caldera won and in the process shattered the strict bipolarity thesis. Abstentions reached a record of 40%. The main reason Caldera, who was 76 years old, won was in essence the same as for Pérez's victory in 1973: Everybody knew him, and the middle classes, probably decisive for the only time in Venezuela's history, thought that he could do the miracle that had been expected of Pérez. That is, in some manner to get the country back on track to the "good old times".

Once back in the presidential palace, Caldera confronted the Venezuelan banking crisis of 1994. He re-imposed exchange controls, which Pérez's administration had lifted as part of a general financial liberalization (unaccompanied by effective regulation, which contributed to the banking crisis). The economy had suffered under the falling oil price, which led to a collapse in government revenues. The steel corporation SIDOR was privatized, and the economy continued to plummet. Fulfilling an election promise, Caldera released Chávez and pardoned all the military and civilian conspirators during the Pérez regime. The economic crisis continued, and by the 1998 elections the traditional political parties had become extremely unpopular; an initial front-runner for the presidency in late 1997 was Irene Saez. Ultimately, Hugo Chávez Frías was elected president.

== Chávez and the Bolivarian Revolution ==
Chávez, a former paratroop lieutenant-colonel who had led an unsuccessful coup d'état in 1992, was elected president in December 1998 on a platform that called for the creation of a "Fifth Republic", a new constitution, a new name ("the Bolivarian Republic of Venezuela"), and a new set of relations between socioeconomic classes. In 1999, voters approved a referendum on a new constitution and in 2000, re-elected Chávez, also placing many members of his Fifth Republic Movement party in the National Assembly. Supporters of Chávez call the process symbolised by him the Bolivarian Revolution and were organised into different government-funded groups, including the Bolivarian Circles.

In April 2002, Chávez was briefly ousted from power in the 2002 Venezuelan coup d'état attempt following actions by some of the military and media and demonstrations by the minority opposition, but he was returned to power after two days as a result of demonstrations by the majority of the public and actions by most of the military.

Chávez also remained in power after a national strike that lasted more than two months in December 2002 – February 2003, including a strike/lockout in the state oil company PDVSA and an August 2004 recall referendum. He was elected for another term in December 2006. In December 2007 in a constitutional referendum, Chávez suffered his first electoral defeat when the voters rejected constitutional changes proposed by the president, some of which would have increased the power of the presidency. The referendum saw a very high level of abstention by the standards of recent polls in Venezuela. However, in February 2009 Chavez called another referendum, proposing the removal of term limits for all elected officials (previously, the constitution limited presidents to two terms, and other officials also had term limits). The referendum took place on 15 February 2009, and was approved.

The 2010 parliamentary elections saw a new opposition electoral coalition, the Coalition for Democratic Unity, win nearly as large a share of the vote as the United Socialist Party of Venezuela (PSUV) but with only 65 seats compared to PSUV's 98. The election was preceded by an electoral reform that favoured PSUV by giving more weight to the countryside. The 2012 presidential elections saw Hugo Chávez re-elected by a substantial margin, but he died in office in early 2013. He was succeeded by Nicolás Maduro (initially as interim president before narrowly winning the 2013 presidential elections).

== Nicolás Maduro ==
=== First term ===
President Nicolás Maduro was formally inaugurated as President of Venezuela on 19 April, after the election commission had promised a full audit of the election results. On 13 May 2013, President Maduro initiated one of his first plans, Plan Patria Segura. A year after the plan was initiated, no changes in crime had been reported since murder rates throughout the country remained the same.

In October 2013, Maduro requested an enabling law to rule by decree in order to fight corruption and to also fight what he called an 'economic war'. On 24 October, he also announced the creation of a new agency, the Vice Ministry of Supreme Happiness, to coordinate all social programmes. In November 2013, weeks before the local elections, President Maduro used his special decree powers and ordered the military to take over appliance stores. Analysts said that the move amounted to a "cannibalizing" of the economy and that it might lead to even more shortages in the future. An article by The Guardian noted that a "significant proportion" of the subsidized basic goods in short supply were being smuggled into Colombia and sold for far higher prices. In February 2014, the government said it had confiscated more than 3,500 tons of contraband on the border with Colombia—food and fuel which, it said, was intended for "smuggling" or "speculation." The president of the National Assembly, Diosdado Cabello, said that the confiscated food should be given to the Venezuelan people, and should not be "in the hands of these gangsters".

==== Opposition wins parliamentary elections ====
In the 2015 Venezuelan parliamentary election the opposition gained a majority; however, on 30 March 2017 the Supreme Court of Venezuela (dominated by Maduro loyalists), announced that since the parliament was in contempt of its rulings, the court would assume legislative duties. Whilst the recession which Venezuela entered in 2014 was precipitated by policy failures, a collapse of the price of oil exacerbated the problem. Economic conditions continued to deteriorate in 2016 when consumer prices rose 800% and the gross domestic product contracted by 18.6%, causing hunger to escalate to the point that the "Venezuela's Living Conditions Survey" (ENCOVI) found nearly 75 percent of the population had lost an average of at least 19 pounds in 2016 due to a lack of proper nutrition. Luis Almagro, secretary general of the Organization of American States (OAS) stated, "I have never seen a country going down so fast, at every level: politically, economically, socially".

Following the 2017 Venezuelan constitutional crisis, and the push to ban potential opposition presidential candidate Henrique Capriles from politics for 15 years, protests grew to their most "combative" since they began in 2014.

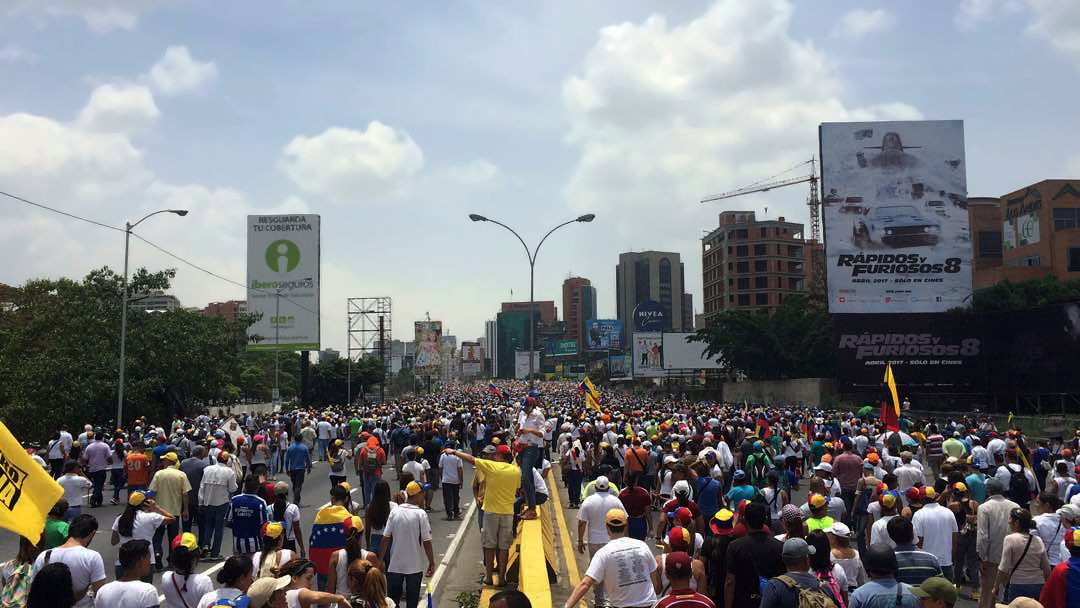
Millions of Venezuelans protesting during the Mother of All Marches

On 1 May 2017 following a month of protests that resulted in at least 29 dead, Maduro called for a Constituent Assembly that would draft a new constitution that would replace the 1999 Venezuela Constitution. He invoked Article 347, and stated that his call for a new constitution was necessary to counter the actions of the opposition. The members of the Constituent Assembly were not to be elected in open elections, but selected from social organizations loyal to Maduro. It would also allow him to stay in power during the interregnum and skip the 2018 presidential elections, as the process would take at least two years.

The opposition started a common front for all the people in Venezuela that oppose the amendment. On 20 June 2017, President of the National Assembly Julio Borges, the opposition-led legislative body of Venezuela, announced the activations of Articles 333 and 350 of the Venezuelan Constitution in order to establish new parallel government.

Constituent Assembly elections were held on 30 July 2017. The decision to hold the election was criticised by members of the international community, with over 40 countries along with supranational bodies such as the European Union, Mercosur and the Organization of American States condemning and failing to recognize the election, stating it would only further escalate tensions. President Maduro's allies — such as Bolivia, Cuba, El Salvador, Nicaragua, Russia and Syria — discouraged foreign intervention in Venezuelan politics and congratulated the president.

The 2017 Constituent Assembly of Venezuela was officially sworn in on 4 August 2017.

On 11 August 2017 US President Donald Trump said that he is "not going to rule out a military option" to confront the autocratic government of Nicolás Maduro and the deepening crisis in Venezuela. Venezuela's Defense Minister Vladimir Padrino immediately criticized Trump for his statement, calling it "an act of supreme extremism" and "an act of madness". The Venezuelan communications minister, Ernesto Villegas, said Trump's words amounted to "an unprecedented threat to national sovereignty".

Economist Helen Yaffe estimates U.S. sanctions on Venezuela have caused the deaths of 100,000 people due to the difficulty of importing medicine and health care equipment.

=== Second term ===
On 20 May 2018, President Nicolás Maduro won the presidential election amidst allegations of massive irregularities by his main rivals. Despite encouragement to resign as president when his first term expired on 10 January 2019, President Maduro was inaugurated by Maikel Moreno, Chief Justice of the Supreme Tribunal of Venezuela. This resulted in widespread condemnation; minutes after taking oath, the Organization of American States approved a resolution in a special session of its Permanent Council in which Maduro was declared illegitimate as President of Venezuela, urging that new elections be summoned. The National Assembly invoked a state of emergency and some nations removed their embassies from Venezuela. With their belief that his election was illegitimate, they claimed that by retaking power, Maduro was converting Venezuela into an illegitimate de facto dictatorship.

Additionally, on 19 January 2019, the president of the National Assembly, Juan Guaidó, was declared the interim president by that body. Guaidó was immediately recognized as the legitimate president by several nations, including the United States and the Lima Group, as well as the Organization of American States. Maduro disputed Guaidó's claim and broke off diplomatic ties with several nations who recognized Guaidó's claim. On 21 February 2019, Nicolás Maduro ordered the closing of his country's border with Brazil. On 23 February, trucks carrying humanitarian aid from Colombia and Brazil attempted to enter Venezuelan territory. Two trucks was set on fire on the Francisco de Paula Santander International Bridge.

Guaidó was recognized as the acting president of Venezuela by about 60 countries. Maduro's support followed traditional geopolitical lines; while most Western and Latin American countries supported Guaidó as acting president. Support for Guaidó declined after the 2019 Venezuelan uprising attempt.

Following increased international sanctions throughout 2019, the Maduro government abandoned socialist policies established by Chávez, such as price and currency controls, which resulted in the country seeing a rebound from economic decline. In a November 2019 interview with José Vicente Rangel, President Nicolás Maduro described dollarization as an "escape valve" that helps the recovery of the country, the spread of productive forces in the country and the economy. However, Maduro said that the Venezuelan bolívar will still remain as the national currency.

=== Capture of Nicolás Maduro by US military ===
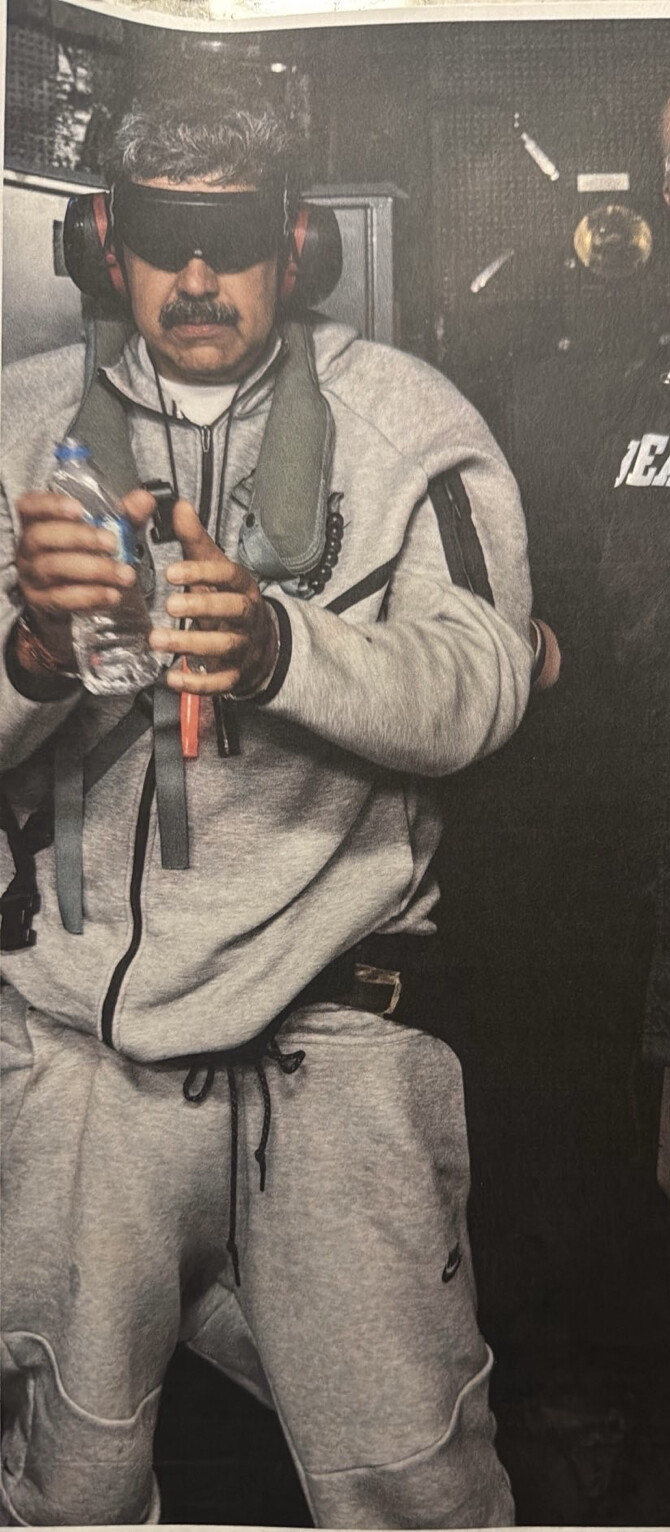
Nicolás Maduro aboard USS Iwo Jima following his capture

On 3 January 2026, the United States launched a military strike in Venezuela and captured incumbent Venezuelan president Nicolás Maduro and his wife, Cilia Flores. The US operation, codenamed Operation Absolute Resolve, began around 2 a.m. local time, when explosions were observed. The US Armed Forces bombed infrastructure across northern Venezuela to suppress air defenses as an apprehension force attacked Maduro's compound in Caracas. Maduro and Flores were transported to New York City by US forces to face their trial for drug trafficking there. The operation is sometimes considered a military conflict because seven US soldiers were injured. At 2 hours and 28 minutes, it qualifies as one of the shortest wars in history.

The US federal government announced that Maduro and Flores had been indicted on several charges related to narcoterrorism. Maduro and Flores pleaded not guilty to the charges in Manhattan federal court on 5 January 2026. US president Donald Trump and his administration justified the operation as a law-enforcement action, with military support, that the president has "inherent constitutional authority" to undertake.

Venezuelan vice president Delcy Rodríguez denounced Maduro's "kidnapping". Venezuelan officials said at least 23 (Note: 23 soldiers killed as published in list by the military while other sources report 24. Independent Venezuelan sources indicate 42 or 43. Vladimir Padrino López said 47 without a list. See § Casualties for more reports.) Venezuelan security officers were killed during the attack. The Cuban government said that 32 members of the Cuban military and intelligence agencies were killed. Officials in the United Nations (UN), the US, and other countries, (Note: Brazil, China, Colombia, Cuba, Eritrea, Mexico, Russia, South Africa, and Spain) as well as international law experts said the raid violated the UN Charter and Venezuela's sovereignty.. Other reactions around the world included celebrations by the Venezuelan diaspora and protests against the attack.

The Venezuelan government remained in place, with Rodríguez sworn in as acting president on 5 January 2026. Multiple political prisoners (including foreigners) detained in Venezuela were released, a gesture which, according to Trump, contributed to avoiding a second wave of attacks. On 30 January, Rodríguez announced an amnesty bill for political prisoners covering the period of 1999 to present, which was approved on 19 February. As of 8 March, the number of political prisoners released confirmed since 8 January was 621 out of an estimate of over 800 held before January, according to human rights organizations. By February, the US and Venezuela had already restarted diplomatic relations, with the Embassy of the United States, Caracas, being reopened for the first time since its closure in 2019.

Trump and his administration made clear that access to Venezuelan oil was a core reason for the action. The US announced a 50-million-barrel oil supply deal with the remaining government in Venezuela, with the first $300 million already received on 20 January. On 29 January, a new law was passed by Rodríguez to give private companies control over the production and sale of oil. In parallel, the US lifted sanctions imposed on Venezuelan oil trade and issued licenses for companies to trade Venezuelan oil. According to US secretary of energy Chris Wright, who visited Venezuela in February, sales of Venezuelan oil have already reached over $1 billion since Maduro's capture and about $5 billion are expected in the upcoming months.

In May 2026, the interim Venezuelan authorities also collaborated in the capture and deportation to the United States of Alex Saab, a close ally of Maduro who was previously pardoned by previous US president Joe Biden during a prisoner exchange and in request for democratic presidential elections in Venezuela in 2024. In June 2026, Niño Guerrero, leader of the Venezuelan criminal organization Tren de Aragua, was killed in a joint operation between Venezuela and the United States.

== See also ==
- First Republic of Venezuela
- German colonization of the Americas
- History of Latin America
- History of South America
- History of the Americas
- List of presidents of Venezuela
- Politics of Venezuela
- Second Republic of Venezuela
- Spanish colonization of the Americas
