= Juan Domingo de Monteverde =

Spanish soldier and governor

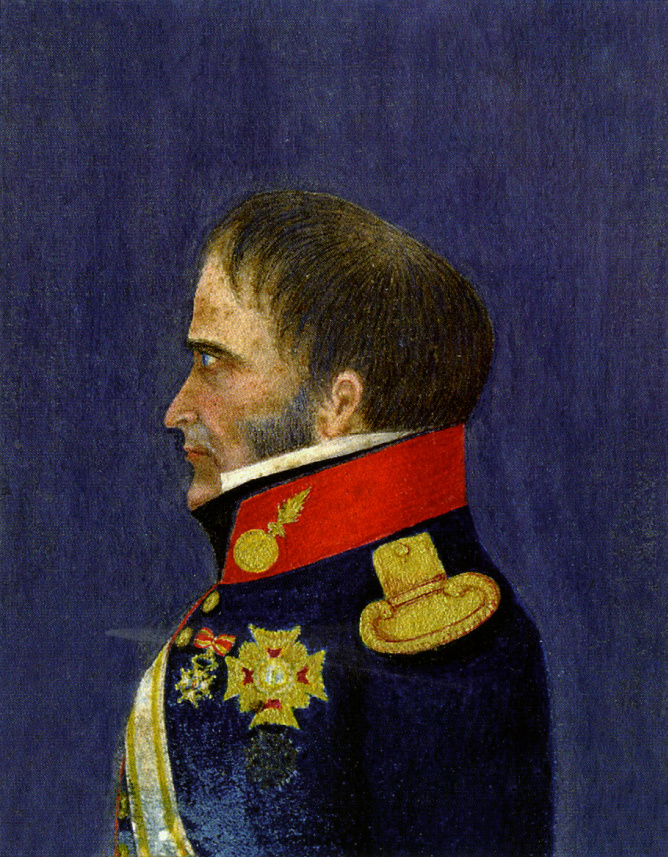
- Portrait of Domingo de Monteverde
- Born: Juan Domingo de Monteverde; April 2, 1773; San Cristóbal de La Laguna, Tenerife, Spain
- Died: September 15, 1832 (aged 59); San Fernando, Cádiz, Spain
- Military career
- Allegiance: Spanish
- Rank: Capitan General of Venezuela
- Conflicts: Venezuelan War of Independence

Juan Domingo de Monteverde y Rivas (born Juan Domingo de Monteverde; 2 April 1773 – 15 September 1832), commonly known as Domingo de Monteverde, was a Spanish soldier, governor and Captain General of Venezuela from June 1812 to 8 August 1813. Monteverde was the leader of Spanish forces in the Venezuelan War of Independence from 1812 to 1813. Monteverde led the military campaign that culminated in the fall of the First Republic of Venezuela in 1812. One year later in 1813, Monteverde was defeated by Simón Bolívar during the Admirable Campaign.

== Early life and campaigns in Venezuela ==
Monteverde was born in the Canarian town of San Cristóbal de La Laguna on 2 April 1773. With well won prestige and the rank of Frigate Captain, he was sent to Venezuela from Puerto Rico. He arrived at Coro in early March 1812 along with other Spanish marines. Monteverde was ordered by the governor of Coro, with a small force of 1550 men with soldiers and officers, to aid the small town of Siquisique, which had sent Fr. Andrés Torellas with news that it intended to defect from the Republic. As a nineteenth-century historian described, "with Spaniards and residents of Coro, a priest named Torellas, a surgeon, ten thousand cartridges, a howitzer, and ten hundredweights of food." Monteverde's military force was not prepared to begin a successful military campaign. The scarcity of resources is understandable, considering how Spain found itself fighting the Peninsular War against the Napoleonic forces in order to regain control over its own territory, and had spent the previous decade fighting mostly as an ally of France. There were no resources to send to the New World, in fact, Spain had been asking for donations and increased revenues from America.

However, there was one crucial factor which aided Monteverde and the royalist cause: the social dissatisfaction of the people with the new rulers. (This lack of support for the republican leadership would later instigate Bolívar to begin a "Social War" during his Admirable Campaign.) After a seven-day march, he occupied the town on 17 March, and Monteverde found it easy to recruit new soldiers from the local population. With a growing force, he decided to continue marching into republican territory, despite having no authorization to do so. His successful advance was helped by the social support offered it by the lower classes, which viewed the mantuano (aristocratic) republican rulers as their enemies. He created an integrated military force of pardos, zambos, Canary Islanders, and other lower-class peoples. Middling and upper-class people also joined his cause.

Many city leaders opened their cities to his informal army, and several mantuanos (among them the Marqués of Casa Leon) became his collaborators. This movement was reinforced by the earthquake on 26 March 1812 and the loss on 30 June of Puerto Cabello under the then-Colonel Simón Bolívar to royalist prisoners who managed to take over San Felipe Fort. Monteverde's vanguard under Francisco Marmól entered Barquisimeto on 2 April after the city defected to the royalist side on 31 March. Eventually he had an army large enough to march on Valencia, the site of a royalist uprising the previous year. After winning a battle against republican troops defending the city on 3 May, he was welcomed by the city. His next goal was Caracas. In June, Monteverde arrived in the proximity of La Victoria and San Mateo and was repulsed in the 1812 Battle of San Mateo, Generalissimo Francisco de Miranda was forced to retreat after he got the news of the capture of Puerto Cabello and a rebellion in Caracas against the republican government, Monteverde's advance culminated in a capitulation agreed between Miranda and Monteverde on 25 July 1812 after the Battle of San Mateo. (Miranda never signed the final version, but it had been approved by his representatives in the negotiations.)

After the fall of the first republic, Miranda was imprisoned and sent to Puerto Rico and later Cádiz. The majority of the patriot officials chose to go into exile, which was an option offered to them under the capitulation. In 1813, Santiago Mariño decided to invade Venezuela from the east, successfully capturing the port of Güiria, which was protected by a very small loyalist force, and later the plaza of Maturín, which Monteverde attempted, but failed to retake. Bolívar began his Admirable Campaign, entering through the Andes. Worried about Bolívar's presence near the Llanos, Monteverde established the main branch for his forces in Valencia, a location in the plains at which the paths of Barinas, the Andes, and Maracaibo merge. His right flank was fortressed in the castle of Puerto Cabello and his rear was supported in Maracay and La Victoria. The positioning of Monteverde's military forces were comparable to those of Miranda in 1812. Nevertheless, Monteverde lost a large part of the popular support that he had managed to build the previous year: the people who had taken him from Coro to the capital abandoned him in the face of Mariño in Maturín and Bolívar in Valencia because Monteverde did not meet, or allow the completion of, popular goals and expectations in 1813.

Monteverde was wounded in action at Las Trincheras on 3 October 1813, and near the end of the same year, he was deposed by his own officers in Puerto Cabello. Field Marshal Juan Manuel Cajigal, nominally chief of José Tomás Boves, assumed the Captaincy General of Venezuela. Monteverde moved to Puerto Rico and in 1816 returned to Spain. Monteverde died in San Fernando, Cádiz, on 15 September 1832 with the rank of Brigadier.

== Major battles in Venezuela ==
- Siege of Puerto Cabello (July 1812) (Victory)
- Battle of San Mateo (25 July 1812) (Defeat)
- Battle of Alto de los Godos (25 May 1813) (Defeat)
- Battle of Las Trincheras (3 October 1813) (Defeat and wounded)

== See also ==
- Royalist (Spanish American independence)

Military offices
Preceded by Fernando Miyares y Gonzáles	Capitan General of Venezuela; 1812–1813	Succeeded by Juan Manuel Cajigal
