= José Félix Ribas Municipality =

José Félix Ribas Municipality may refer to the following places in the Venezuela:

- José Félix Ribas Municipality, Aragua
- José Félix Ribas Municipality, Guárico, Guárico
