= Tomaz Ribas =

Portuguese writer, professor and critic

Tomaz Emídio Leopoldo de Carvalho Cavalcanti de Albuquerque Schiappa Pectra Sousa Ribas (20 June 1918 – 21 March 1999) was a professor, writer, ethnologist and critic of theatre and dance.

== Early life and education ==
He was born at Alcáçovas, Viana do Alentejo, on 20 June 1918. He entered the Conservatório Nacional in Lisbon against his father’s will, where he concluded the Special Course of Dance and Choreography. He was awarded a degree in Hispanic Studies by the Universidad Internacional Menendez Pelayo de Santander (Spain) and was granted scholarships by the Instituto de Alta Cultura, the Fundação Calouste Gulbenkian, the Spanish Ministry of Culture and the State Department of the United States of America. He trained at the Académie Nationale de la Danse under Serge Lifar’s supervision, at the Archives Internationales de la Danse, at the Italian Archives of theatre and dance and at American theatre schools.

== Career ==
He was Archivist and Attaché to the Direction of the Teatro Nacional de São Carlos, Secretary and Professor of the Centro de Estudos de Dança do Instituto para a Alta Cultura, Adjoint Director to the Teatro Nacional D. Maria II, Professor at the Escola de Teatro do Conservatório Nacional, the Instituto Superior de Novas Profissões and the Escola de Turismo do Algarve, Delegate of the Ministério e da Secretaria de Estado da Cultura na Região Sul (Algarve), Head of the Divisão de Etnografia e Folclore do I.N.A.T.E.L., Member of the Conselho Científico e Orientador de Seminários da Escola Superior de Dança do Instituto Politécnico de Lisboa, Member of the Portuguese Section of CIOFF - U.N.E.S.C.O., etc. He was granted the Commend of the Order of Merit and was honored as Doctor Honoris Causa by the Université de la Danse (Paris).

He died in Lisbon, Campolide, on 21 March 1999. He was buried at the Cemitério dos Prazeres, Lisbon, at the Talhão dos Artistas.

== Selected works ==
His published works include:

- Monotonia, Montanha Russa, Cais das Colunas, A Casa de Malafaia, O Primeiro Negócio, Histórias de Bichos d’África, Giovanna: Histórias Arquivadas, História da Gata Borralheira, Roberto e Melisandra, Retrato de Senhora, A Casa de Isaac, Cláudia e as Vozes do Mar, Auto da Alma, O que é o Ballet, O Ballet no Passado e no Presente, O Ballet Contemporâneo, Etnologia I e II, A Dança I e II, Como Fazer Teatro, O Teatro e a sua História, Danças Populares Portuguesas, Danças do Povo Português, Anna Pavlova, Introdução ao Estudo das Danças Populares de Cabo Verde, Introdução ao Estudo das Danças da África Portuguesa, O Teatro Popular de São Tomé e Príncipe, O Tchiloli – Teatro Clássico Popular de São Tomé e Príncipe, Aspectos da Etnografia e do Folclore da Nazaré, Guia de Recolha de Danças Populares, O Teatro Popular Tradicional Português and Monografias da Dança Folclórica da Europa.
- Beja – À Descoberta do Passado and O Teatro da Trindade – 125 Anos de Vida

His unpublished works include:

- Memoirs, O Teatro Moderno, A Dança Moderna e Pós Moderna, Danças Populares Tradicionais Portuguesas, Tentativa de uma Classificação das Danças Populares Portuguesas, O Ballet Russo e Soviético, Bosquejo histórico das Danças Tradicionais Portuguesas,
- the novels Prelúdio, Morte and Sonata a Quatro
- the plays Retrato de Senhora, Pedro e a Morte de Inês, A Única Mulher de Barba-Azul and O Grito de Medea.
