= Rabic =

Rabic and related terms may refer to any of the following:

- Something of or related to rabies, a mammalian viral disease
- Simon Rabič, birth name of Simon Robič (1824–1897), Slovenian priest and naturalist
- Urška Rabič (born 1985), Slovenian former alpine skier
