= Ivan Ribać =

Serbian boxer, sports instructor, administrator, and politician

- Иван Рибаћ
- Born: March 11, 1977 (age 48)
- Occupation(s): Boxer, sports instructor, politician

Ivan Ribać (Serbian Cyrillic: Иван Рибаћ; born 11 March 1977) is a PhD in political science, boxer, sports instructor, administrator, and politician in Serbia. He was elected to the National Assembly of Serbia in the 2020 Serbian parliamentary election as a member of the Serbian Progressive Party.

== Early career ==
Both Ivan and his brother Dejan Ribać were members of Serbia's national boxing team. Ivan participated several international boxing events, including the 2004 European Amateur Boxing Championships in Pula, Croatia, where he scored victories over world amateur champion John Dovi and Olympic medalist Rudolf Kraj. His boxing career was ultimately cut short by a broken arm. He subsequently became the director of Serbia's department for the suppression of smuggling, and in September 2018 he was appointed as an assistant director in customs administration.

The Ribać brothers have established both the Association for Martial Arts Fans and the Braća Ribać training center in Belgrade. A 2019 profile in Novosti noted that the center was providing a training program for children living with special needs.

== Politician ==
Ribać received the thirty-sixth position on the Serbian Progressive Party's Aleksandar Vučić — For Our Children electoral list in the 2020 Serbian parliamentary election and was elected to the assembly when the list won a landslide majority with 188 mandates.
