= José Félix Ribas Municipality, Aragua =

José Félix Ribas Municipality Municipio José Félix Ribas
- Municipality
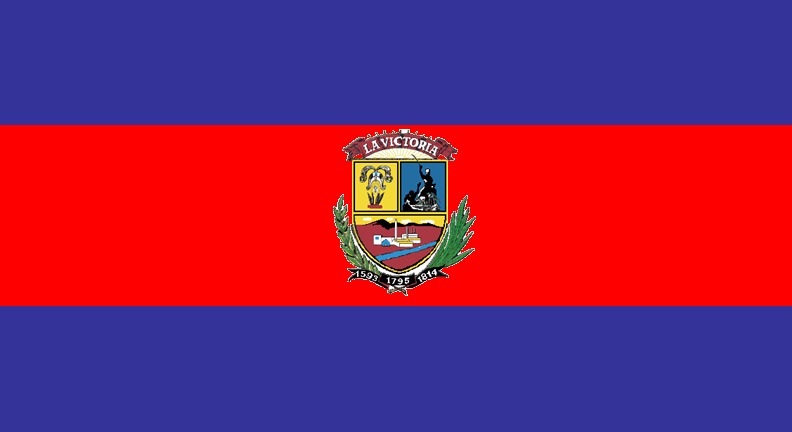
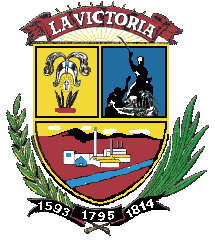
- Flag Coat of arms

- Location in Aragua

- Location in Venezuela
- Coordinates: 10°12′07″N 67°19′47″W
- Country: Venezuela
- State: Aragua
- Municipal seat: La Victoria

Government
  - Mayor: Juan Sánchez Campos (PSUV)

Area
  - Total: 387.3 km^{2} (149.5 sq mi)

Population (2011)
  - Total: 143,501
  - Density: 370.5/km^{2} (959.6/sq mi)
- Time zone: UTC−4 (VET)
- Area code(s): 0244

The José Félix Ribas Municipality is one of the 18 municipalities (municipios) that makes up the Venezuelan state of Aragua and, according to the 2011 census by the National Institute of Statistics of Venezuela, the municipality has a population of 143,501. The town of La Victoria is the shire town of the José Félix Ribas Municipality.

== History ==
La Victoria is famous for the independence battle of February 12, 1814, where José Félix Ribas led a young and inexperienced army that succeeded in halting the royalist troops of José Tomás Boves. Venezuela celebrates "Youth Day" every February 12 in La Victoria, with a ceremony is usually presided by the President of the Republic.

== Demographics ==
The José Félix Ribas Municipality, according to a 2007 population estimate by the National Institute of Statistics of Venezuela, has a population of 156,139 (up from 137,581 in 2000). This amounts to 9.3% of the state's population. The municipality's population density is 372.65 inhabitants per square kilometre (965.2/sq mi).

== Government ==
The mayor of the José Félix Ribas Municipality is Juan Carlos Sánchez, elected on November 23, 2008, with 48% of the vote. He replaced Rosa León Brabo shortly after the elections. The municipality is divided into five parishes; Capital José Félix Ribas, Castor Nieves Ríos, Las Guacamayas, Pao de Zárate, and Zuata.

== See also ==
- La Victoria
- Aragua
- Municipalities of Venezuela
