= Riba (disambiguation) =

Riba is an Arabic word meaning usury.

Riba or RIBA may also refer to:

- Riba (surname)
- La Riba, a municipality in Catalonia, north-eastern Spain
- Royal Institute of British Architects
  - RIBA International Award
  - RIBA Journal
- Recombinant ImmunoBlot Assay, a technique used in immunogenetics to detect specific proteins in a sample of tissue. It is also known as the Western Blot test
- Rabbi Isaac ben Asher ha-Levi an 11th-century German Tosafist

== See also ==
- Ribas (disambiguation)
- Reba (disambiguation)
- Rio (disambiguation)
- Ríos (disambiguation)
