= Battle of La Victoria (1812) =

In La Victoria, Aragua, Venezuela

- Part of the Venezuelan War of Independence
Date	20 and 29 June 1812
Location	La Victoria, Venezuela 10°13′40″N 67°20′01″W
Result	Tactical Venezuelan victory Strategic Royalists victory

Belligerents
Venezuela	(Spain) Spanish Empire

Commanders and leaders
Francisco de Miranda	Domingo de Monteverde

Strength
5,000	3,000

The Battle of La Victoria occurred on 20 and 29 June 1812, in La Victoria, Venezuela.

== The battle ==
Both Spanish assaults on 20 and 29 June on the city of La Victoria by captain Domingo de Monteverde against the forces of Francisco de Miranda were repulsed by the Venezuelan forces entrenched in the city and Monterverde fell back to San Mateo.

Meanwhile, in Puerto Cabello, the Spanish prisoners of war held there, took control of the San Felipe Castle and at the same time, a slave rebellion near Caracas broke out. This convinced Miranda that it would do more harm than good to continue the resistance.

== Consequences ==
Miranda entered into negotiations with Monteverde and a ceasefire was signed on 25 July 1812. Monteverde did not honour the conditions of the ceasefire and several days later arrested many patriots who had been granted amnesty, including Francisco de Miranda, who would die in prison. The First Venezuelan Republic came to an end when Monteverde's forces entered Caracas on 1 August.
