= La Victoria, Aragua =

La Victoria
- City
- Nuestra Señora de La Victoria
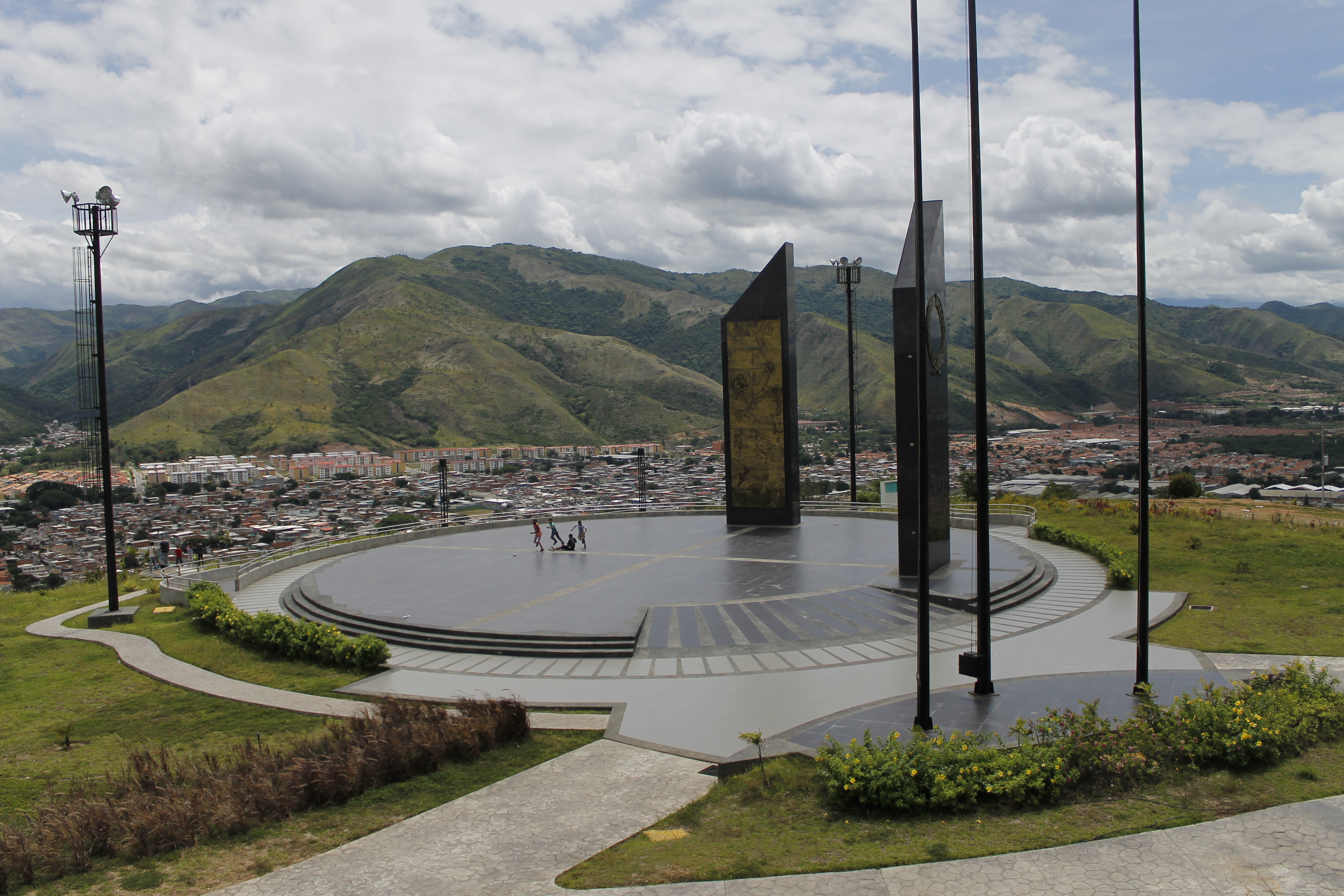
- Monument to the youth

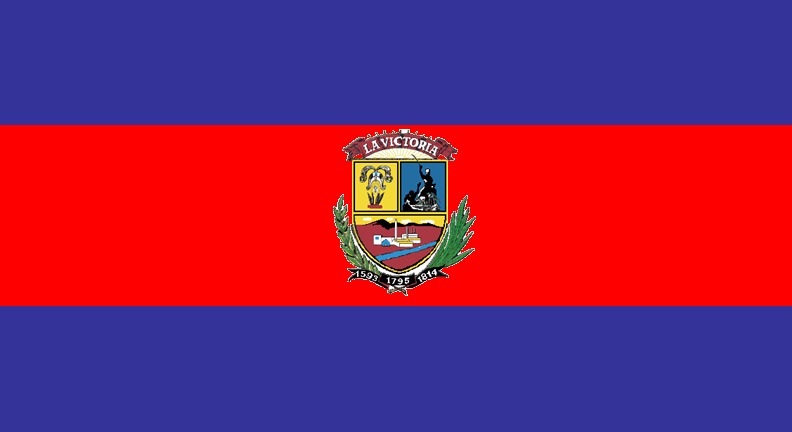
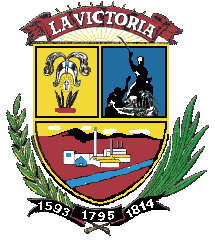
- Flag Coat of arms

- Location within Venezuela
- Coordinates: 10°13′40″N 67°20′01″W
- Country: Venezuela
- State: Aragua
- Municipality: José Félix Ribas Municipality
- Founded: 1620

Area
  - Total: 55.43 km^{2} (21.40 sq mi)
- Elevation: 550 m (1,800 ft)

Population (2011)
  - Total: 143,468
  - Density: 2,588/km^{2} (6,704/sq mi)
- Demonym: victoriano/a
- Time zone: UTC−4 (VET)
- Postal code: 2121
- Area code: 0244
- Climate: Aw
- Website: Municipal website

La Victoria (Spanish pronunciation: [la βiɣˈtoɾja]) is a city in the state of Aragua, Venezuela.

It is famous for the independence battle of 12 February 1814, the Battle of La Victoria, where José Félix Ribas led a young and inexperienced army that succeeded in halting the royalist troops of José Tomás Boves at La Victoria. Venezuela celebrates "Youth Day" every 12 February in La Victoria, with a ceremony usually presided over by the President of the Republic.

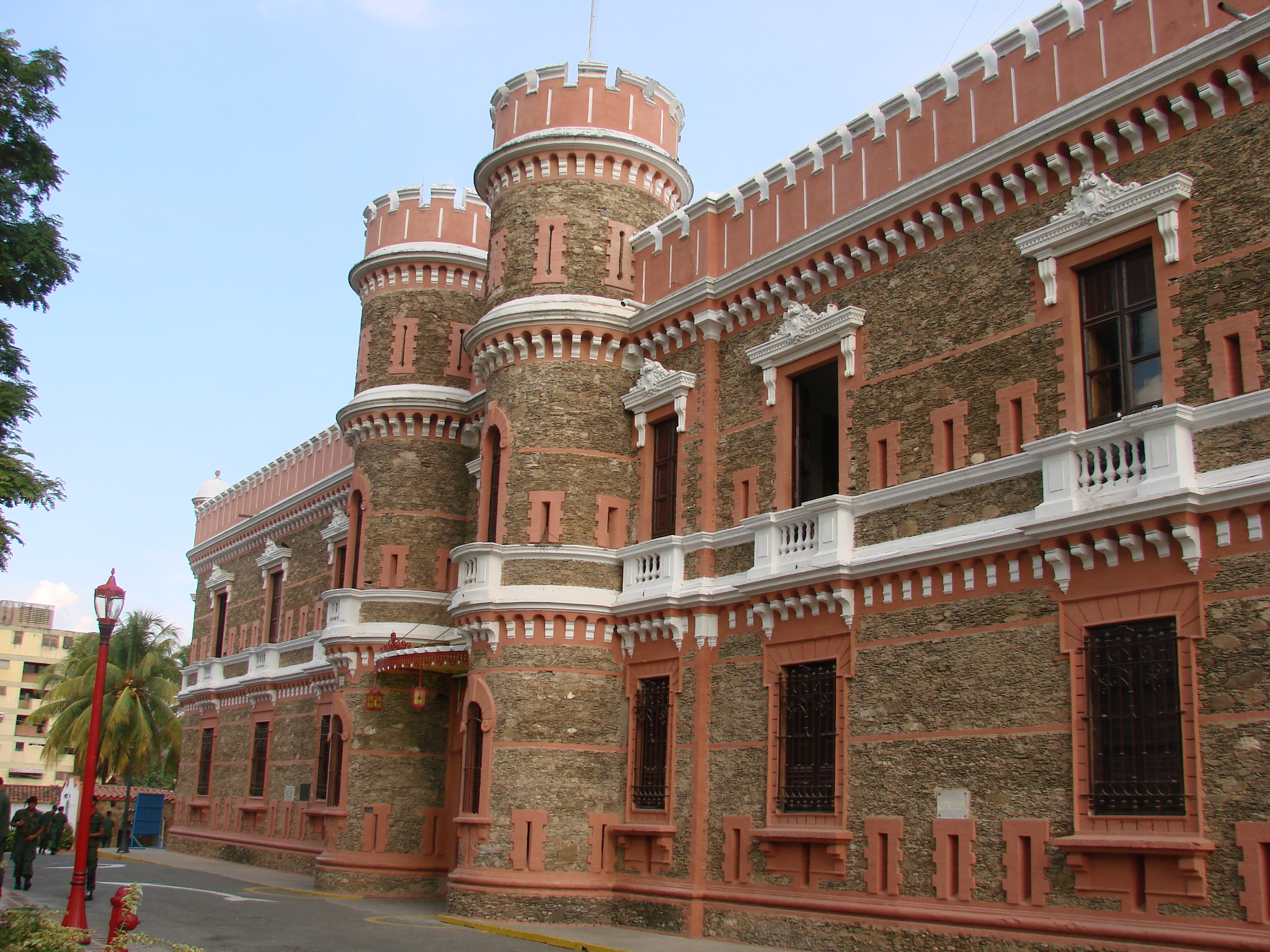
Cuartel Mariano Montilla, La Victoria.

In 1902, the siege of La Victoria took place when the city was attacked by the forces of the Liberating Revolution led by General Manuel Antonio Matos with the aim of overthrow the government of the general Cipriano Castro. This action involved the personal intervention of General Castro, President of the Republic, who defended his regime. At the end, with the help of General Leopoldo Baptista and the vice-president Juan Vicente Gomez, the outcome was decided in his favor. This battle began on October 11 and ended on November 2 of that year, with the unenviable result of being the war that cost the most lives in Venezuela, including the battles of the War of Independence.

== Notable people ==
- Cayito Aponte (1938–2018), comedian, opera singer
- Gabriel Arias (born 2000), infielder for the Cleveland Guardians
- Wilfred Iván Ojeda (1955–2011), journalist and politician
- Edmundo González (born 1949), politician

== See also ==
- List of cities and towns in Venezuela
