= Battle of Alto de los Godos =

- Part of the Venezuelan War of Independence (Military career of Simón Bolívar)
Date	25 May 1813
Location	Maturín, Venezuela
Result	Patriot victory

Belligerents
Venezuelan Patriots	(Spain) Royalists

Commanders and leaders
Manuel Piar; José Tadeo Monagas; José Francisco de Azcúe; Andrés Rojas; Remigio Fuenmayor	(Spain) Domingo de Monteverde

Strength
500; 2 cannons	2,260

Casualties and losses
Unknown	27 officers dead 452 soldiers dead 50 wounded

The Battle of Alto de los Godos took place on 25 May 1813 in Maturín, Venezuela, in the Spanish colonial Viceroyalty of New Granada during the Venezuelan War of Independence. The advancing, superior Royalist forces under Domingo de Monteverde were defeated by the patriots at a hilltop that came to be known as the Alto de los Godos (Spanish: "Heights of the Goths"). Women fighters, including Juana Ramírez, played a key role on the patriot side.

== Background ==
Royalist forces had twice before attempted to capture Maturín from the patriots in 1813. On 20 March a force under Antonio Zuazola had been defeated by a much smaller patriot force. A second attack in April also proved fruitless, with heavy casualties. Royalist officer Domingo de Monteverde sailed from La Guaita for a third attack on 27 April, bringing 260 regular troops recently arrived from Spain and 2,000 militiamen. Patriot forces in the area amounted to only around 500 men.

== Battle ==
The battle took place at a hill known after the battle as the Alto de los Godos (Spanish: "Heights of the Goths") that was the site of a camp for the Spanish royalist forces. Monteverde's forces were advancing into the territory as one of five attempts to take control of the region. Monteverde's men fortified the hilltop against attack.

The battle is notable for its inclusion of women in combat, such as the patriot Juana Ramírez, who was also known as "The Advancer" (La Avanzadora) after a decisive charge she made in the battle. Ramírez was part of a 100-strong all-female artillery units and charged the Royalists wielding her sword in an action that helped turn the tide of the battle for the outnumbered patriots. Around 480 royalists were killed in the battle, including most of the fresh troops from Spain. One royalist eyewitness complained that the Venezuelan militias had shown little enthusiasm for fighting and that almost all of the regulars had been killed. The same man stated that the patriots had spared black royalists and that Monteverde had only escaped due to the protection of his "zambo" orderly. The royalists left three cannon, a mortar and six thousand pesos on the battlefield as they retreated to Caracas.

== See also ==
- Colonial Venezuela

== Sources ==
- Historia de la revolución de la República de Colombia en la América Meridional, Volumen 2 page 123, by José Manuel Restrepo
