= Battle of Boyacá =

Part of Bolivar's campaign to liberate New Granada

- Part of Bolívar's campaign to liberate New Granada and the Colombian War of Independence
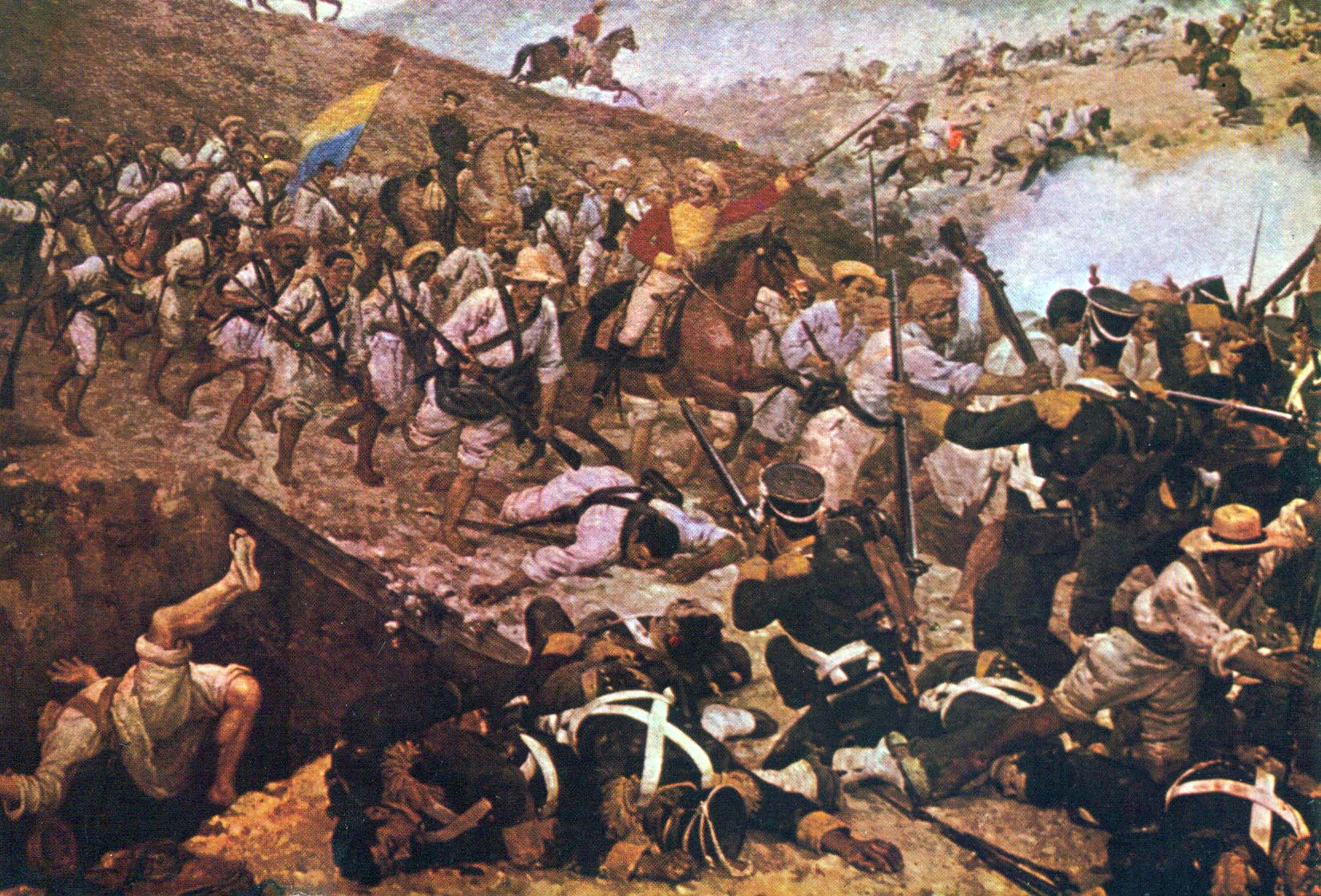
- Battle of Boyaca, Martín Tovar y Tovar
| Date | August 7, 1819 |
| Location | Ventaquemada, Boyacá 5°27′00″N 73°25′45″W |
| Result | Patriot victory |

Belligerents
| Venezuela; New Granada | Kingdom of Spain and the Indies (the Spains) |

Commanders and leaders
| Simón Bolívar; Francisco de Paula Santander; José Antonio Anzoátegui | José Maria Barreiro (POW); Francisco Jiménez (POW) |

Strength
| 2,850; 2,350 infantry 500 cavalry | 2,670; 2,300 infantry 350 cavalry 20 gunners 3 guns |

Casualties and losses
| 13 killed 53 wounded | 100 killed 150 wounded 1,600 captured |
- Location within Colombia Battle of Boyacá (South America) Battle of Boyacá (America)

The Battle of Boyacá (1819), also known as the Battle of Boyacá Bridge, was a decisive victory by a combined army of Venezuelan and New Granadan troops along with a British Legion led by General Simon Bolivar over the III Division of the Spanish Expeditionary Army of Costa Firme commanded by Spanish Colonel José María Barreiro. This victory ensured the success of Bolívar's campaign to liberate New Granada. The battle of Boyacá is considered a crucial point in the independence of the north of South America, as it allowed further patriot victories at the battles of Carabobo in Venezuela, Pichincha in Ecuador, and Junín and Ayacucho in Peru. New Granada acquired its definitive independence from the Spanish Monarchy, although fighting with royalist forces would continue for years.

Under the overall command of General Simon Bolivar, the Brigadier Generals Francisco de Paula Santander and José Antonio Anzoátegui led a combined patriot army of Neogranadines and Venezuelans that defeated in two hours the Spanish Royalist forces led by Spanish Colonels José María Barreiro and Francisco Jiménez who would both be captured in battle. The effective destruction of the Royalist Army in central New Granada led to the collapse of the Royalist Government in its capital of Santa Fe, with Viceroy Juan de Samano, along with other government officials, fleeing the capital shortly after news had reached of the battle. The battle led to the liberation of much of central New Granada and would lead to the union between New Granada and Venezuela creating the Republic of Colombia (Gran Colombia) in December of that same year.

The battle occurred 150 km from Bogotá in the Andes Mountains, in a place known as Casa de Teja, close to a bridge over the Teatinos River and 3 roads heading to Samaca, Motavita and Tunja, an area which is now part of the Boyacá Department. The site of the battlefield today is dotted with various monuments and statues that commemorate the battle.

== Prelude ==
1. Map of the Bolívar's campaign to liberate New Granada; 2. Battle of Boyacá's day; 3. Disposition of troops

General Simon Bolivar's Patriot Army surprised the Spanish by strategically crossing the Andes Mountain Range through the Paramo de Pisba into the Boyacá region in early July of 1819, however the march had weakened his army. To prevent this threat from growing stronger, Viceroy Juan de Samano ordered the commander of the Spanish forces in New Granada–which were the III Division of the Expeditionary Army of Costa Firme, led by artillery Colonel Jose Maria Barreiro to intercept and defeat Bolivar's army to prevent him from reaching the capital of Santa Fe. This would lead to the two forces clashing at the Battle of Vargas Swamp on July 25.

After Bolívar secured a narrow victory at the Battle of Vargas Swamp on July 25th, the Patriot Army camped near the vicinity of the battlefield, while Spanish Forces camped in the nearby town of Paipa. Both armies still had the same goal of reaching the capital Santa Fe, which was only defended by some 400 Spanish troops. On August 3, still camped in Paipa the Spanish observed Bolivar's forces cross the Chicamocha River near Paipa and then at night observed him by candlelight retreat to his original positions across the river. The Spanish then rested unaware of Bolivar's feint, as he ordered a nocturnal countermarch crossing the river again and taking the alternate route to the city of Tunja through the Toca Road.

This allowed Bolivar to outmaneuver his Spanish counterpart and gain the lead for the race to Santa Fe, a reversal of the previous situation with Bolivar now trying to prevent Barreiro from reaching the capital. On August 4 at 9:00 am the Patriot Army reached the village of Chivata and 2 hours later entered and occupied the city of Tunja. The city had been lightly defended as a small garrison and the Governor Juan Lono had left the city in the direction of Paipa to give Colonel Barreiro the supplies and reinforcements he had begged the Viceroy for, in the city Bolivar was able to obtain 600 rifles for his army.

Barreiro would eventually find out about this on August 5 and quickly marched his army southwest, midday he rendezvoused with Governor Juan Lono who provided him with 12,000 cartridges and 3 artillery pieces (2 howitzers and 1 cannon) that had been sent by the Viceroy. Upon learning that Bolivar had taken the city and seeing that his line of communication with the capital was cut, he ordered his army march around Tunja through the mountains northwest of the city at night through roads deemed impassable during the rainy season to avoid detection and gain the lead once gain. This march began in the town of Combita at 1 am August 6 and then proceeded to Motavita through a heavy downpour reaching the town at 11:30am where the army camped for the night. Marching through Motavita was considered a wise move strategically for the Spanish, due to its higher elevation one is able to observe Tunja from it. However Barreiro's movement did not go undetected and patriot spies informed Bolivar of their movements

== Battle ==
At 3:30 a.m. on Saturday, August 7, the Royalist army departed Motavita and continued their march towards Santa Fe. From Motavita they marched down the Samaca road with the intention of rejoining the main Camino Real (Royal Road to Santa Fe) at the Casa de Teja or Casa de Postas where the road formed a Y shape as both the Samaca road and Camino Real converged and became a single road that crossed the Boyacá Bridge. The Boyacá Bridge was an important bridge that was part of the Camino Real de Santa Fe, where it crossed the Teatinos River which was swollen at this time of year as a result of winter rain season. The distance to the bridge was only 25 km which the Spanish completed in 7 hours 30 minutes, at an average pace of 18 minutes per kilometer. Early morning that same day at 7 am, Bolivar left Tunja and took up an observation point at the San Lazaro heights near Tunja, from there around 9 am he spotted the Royalist Army and was able to deduce the route that they were taking. A little after 10 through Colonel Manuel Manrique he ordered that

Generals Santander and Anzoategui to immediately set out for Santa Fe along the Camino Real and to destroy Barreiro wherever they may find him

Upon receiving this order, General Santander's Vanguard Division set out from Tunja toward Casa de Teja on the Camino Real with Anzoátegui's Rearguard Division following suit. Since 7am the Patriot army had been assembled in the central plaza of Tunja ready to move out at a moments notice, the bridge lay some 16km from Tunja, the Patriot army completed this in around 4 hours of marching. Between the hours of 12 to 1pm a fraction of the Royalist vanguard which was composed of the 2nd and 3rd Numancia infantry battalions along with some dragoons under the command of Colonel Francisco Jiménez arrived and took up position near the Casa de Teja, from where they could observe the bridge. Jiménez observing that there was no presence of patriot forces in the vicinity allowed his troops to rest and ordered that lunch rations be served.

Shortly before 2:00 p.m., patriot Captain Andres Ibarra and his forces spotted the Casa de Teja and the vanguard of the Spanish Army. The Spaniards spotted him too and the two exchanged fire, with Jimenez ordering his men to follow and engage what he believed was only a small observation force. 20 royalists chased after the Patriot force but later returned when they realized that this was a bigger force. General Santander who came marching down the Camino Real with the rest of the patriot vanguard upon seeing this unfold ordered Lieutenant Colonel Joaquín París commander of the Cazadores Battalion to attack the Royalist forces at the Casa Teja.

The Spanish vanguard was forced to fall back to river and crossed the strategic bridge over the Teatinos River and took defensive positions there. Meanwhile, the full vanguard of the Patriot army under Santander had reached Casa de Teja. The two vanguards now found themselves on opposite sides of the river, with this Santander then ordered Colonel Antonio Bejar to take some forces down the river and cross it in order to attack the Spanish vanguard from the rear. The Spanish rearguard was still several kilometers behind, so General Anzoátegui ordered to block the way between the vanguard and the rearguard of the Spanish forces. The rearguard, outnumbered, retreated to a small hill close to Casa de Teja.

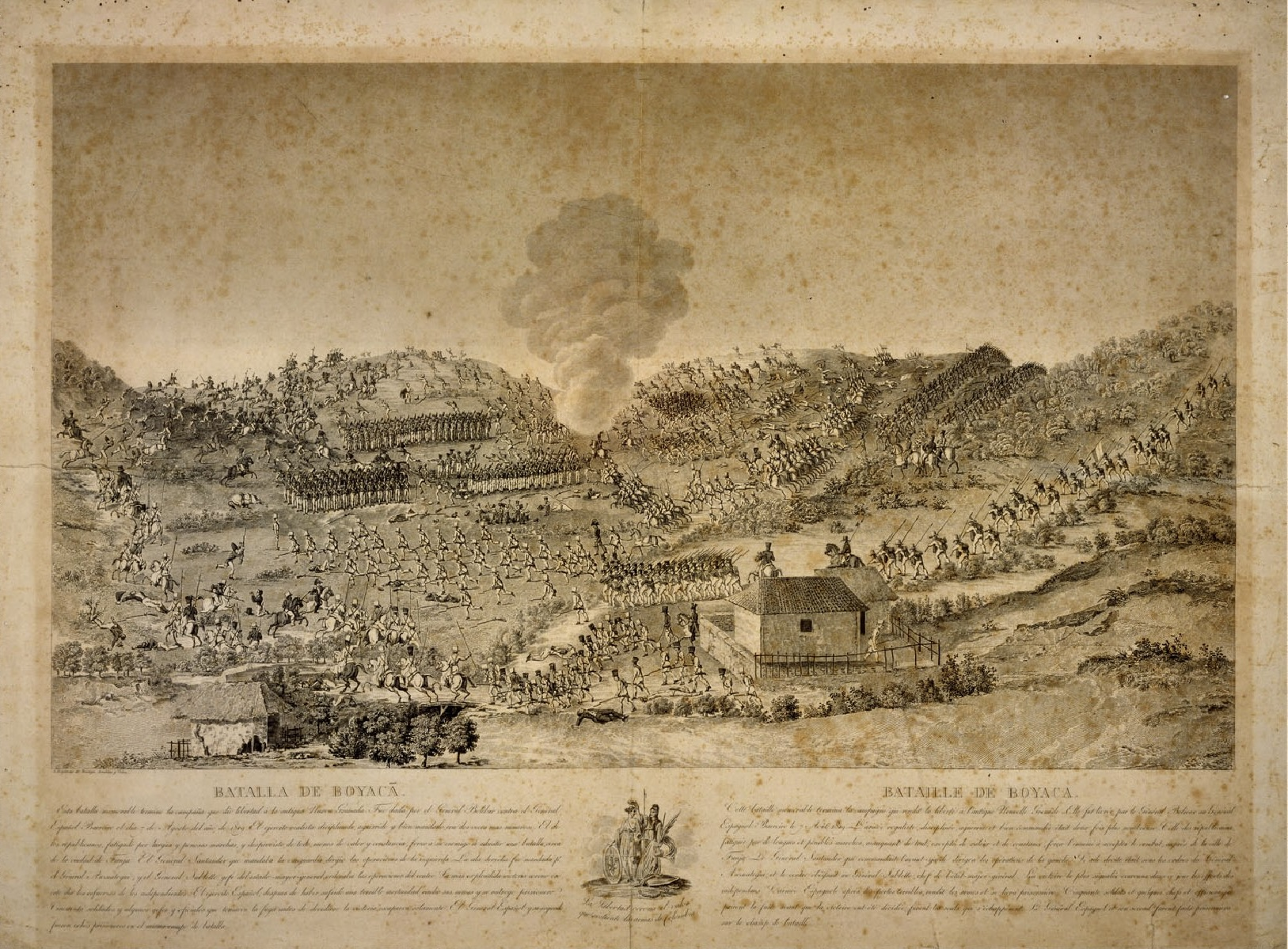
An engraving made in 1824 depicting the battle by J.M. Darmet.

Anzoátegui then ordered a flank attack on the Spanish rearguard: battalions Barcelona and Bravos de Paez were to attack on the right side while the Legion Britanica and Rifles Battalion attacked on the left. The British Legion was a special forces squad composed of British and Irish people, which aided the revolutionary army in certain key battles for independence in South American countries. Unable to cross the river the Spanish assumed battle positions by the Casa de Teja: in the center they positioned three artillery pieces surrounded by the King's 1st infantry battalion to the left and the King's 2nd infantry battalion on the right, and on the wings, the Mounted Grenadiers and Dragoon cavalry units. Arthur Sandes commander of Rifles Battalion charged the royalist artillery. This charge disrupted the arming of the 3 artillery pieces the Spanish possessed (they had transported them unassembled) only one of them was able to be assembled which allowed it to fire 3 shots before the gun carriage that supported it broke rendering it useless. Outnumbered, the Spanish rear guard began to retreat without any clear direction. Therefore, Bolívar ordered lancers units to attack the center of the Royalist infantry, the 3rd and 5th companies of the Granadan Dragoons charged the Patriot cavalry however the patriot cavalry conducted a turn face maneuver causing the dragoons to retreat as the patriot lancers had longer lances than they did. The other Spanish cavalry squadron the Mounted Grenadiers, ran away from the battle via the road towards Samaca. The charge of two patriot army cavalry squadrons caused panic amongst the Spanish troops, who were formed up in a column to resist the attack, although they were given the order to perform a bayonet charge this was not carried out due to the panic and confusion. Barreiro and his officers tried in vain to contain the rout of their soldiers and dismounted from their horses which condemned them to easily be captured by their enemy.

Meanwhile, one kilometer and a half behind Casa de Teja, Bejar's Patriot vanguard managed to ford the river and was approaching the rear of the Royalist vanguard force. Once it reached them, the vanguard forces engaged in battle, while this occurred Santander led a charge across the bridge by force, using bayonets. The Spanish forces fled, leaving on the bridge their leader, Colonel Juan Tolrá who was killed. As the assembly of enemy prisoners began, the battle was over shortly after 4:30 p.m have only lasted a little more than 2 hours. The Patriots only suffered 66 casualties in total with some 13 dead and 53 wounded, meanwhile Barreiro's III Division was effectively dismantled as a result of the battle suffering 100 dead, 150 wounded, and 1,600 captured.

== Aftermath ==
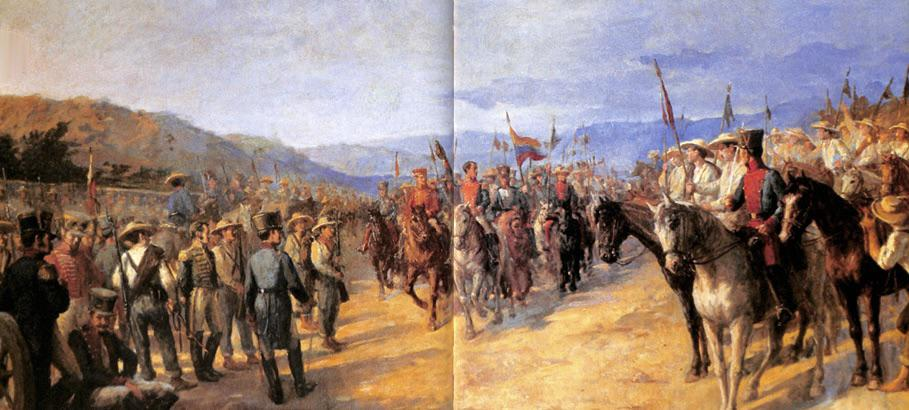
The Battle of Boyacá (1920) by Ricardo Acevedo Bernal depicts the Patriot Army triumphant after the conclusion of the battle with Bolívar and his officers at the center of the painting

For their actions on the battlefield, Santander and Anzoátegui were both promoted to General of Division. At least 1,600 troops and several of the Spanish commanders, including Barreiro himself, were captured at the end of the battle. Since the majority of these captured troops were composed of Venezuelan and New Granadans, these troops were immediately incorporated into the Patriot Army which considerably augmented its size allowing Bolivar to dispatch these new units from the battlefield to other areas of New Granada that had not been liberated yet.

Through a messenger, who rode nonstop for 30 hours over the 100 km of bad roads that separated the battlefield from the capital, Viceroy Juan de Sámano was informed of Barreiro's defeat around 10 pm on August 8. Not wishing to take any chances Sámano hastily prepared to abandon the capital and did so at 9:00 am on August 9 bound for Cartagena by way of Honda disguised as a peasant. So hasty was the Viceroy's departure that he failed to destroy important government documents and archives and left behind some 900,000 pesos in gold, silver, and currency. Earlier that same day at 7:00 am Colonel Sebastian de La Calzada blew up the gunpowder supply in the arsenal and left with the 400 troops who were stationed in the city bound for Popayan. Royalist sympathizers and other government officials also fled the capital.

Bolivar arrived on 10 August with a group of cavalry in advance of his army where he received a jubilant welcome from the inhabitants of the city. On 18 September, a victory ceremony was held for the patriot army in the Plaza Mayor, Bolivar was crowned with a laurel wreath given to him by a group of 20 women of the most prestigious families of the city who were all dressed in white. Along with this crown, Bolivar, Santander, and Anzoategui were all awarded the Cruz de Boyaca medal which had been created for the occasion. This victory ceremony was accompanied by a large number of dances and balls held in honor of the victors with many of the officers along with Bolivar himself attending these festivities.

On the orders of Santander, Colonel Barreiro and 38 more were executed in Bogotá on October 11, 1819, because of the Decree of War to the Death. The bridge in question, the Puente de Boyacá, is no longer in use but it has been maintained as a symbol of the Independence of South America.

== Consequences ==
The consequences of Bolivar's victory at Boyaca bridge lead to large chain of events that would end up changing the history of South America forever.

- The final defeat of Royal forces in central New Kingdom of Granada and the weakening of the rest of the forces in all America.
- The end of Spanish control over the American provinces, with the escape of viceroy Juan de Samano.
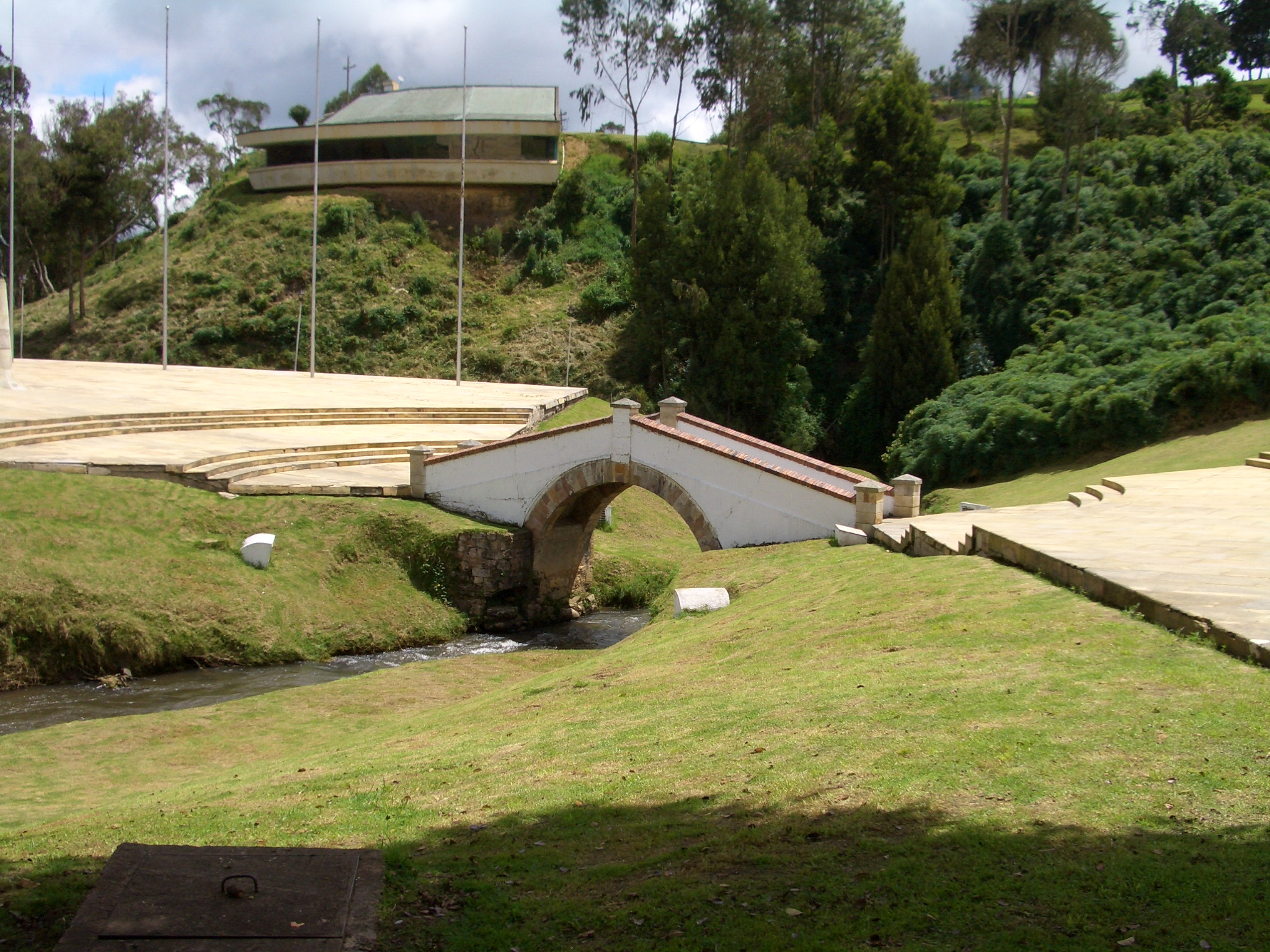
  Replica of the Boyaca Bridge, built by the order of President Marco Fidel Suarez in 1919 in commemoration of the 100th anniversary of the battle.
- The creation of Gran Colombia in December of 1819.
- The start of an autonomous government in the former Spanish provinces.
- The subsequent independence of Venezuela, Peru, Ecuador and the creation of Bolivia, after a liberation campaign.

August 7 is a national holiday in Colombia. On this date every 4 years the elected President of Colombia is inaugurated as president by taking the presidential oath of office while also receiving the Presidential sash in the Plaza de Bolivar in Bogota. August 7 is also Army Day (Spanish: Día del Ejército Nacional) in Colombia, the Colombian Army holds a large military ceremony at the site of the battle to commemorate its anniversary. This was established officially in 1978 under the administration of President Alfonso López Michelsen.
