= Battle of Vargas Swamp =

1819 Colombian War of Independence battle

- Part of Bolívar's campaign to liberate New Granada and the Colombian War of Independence
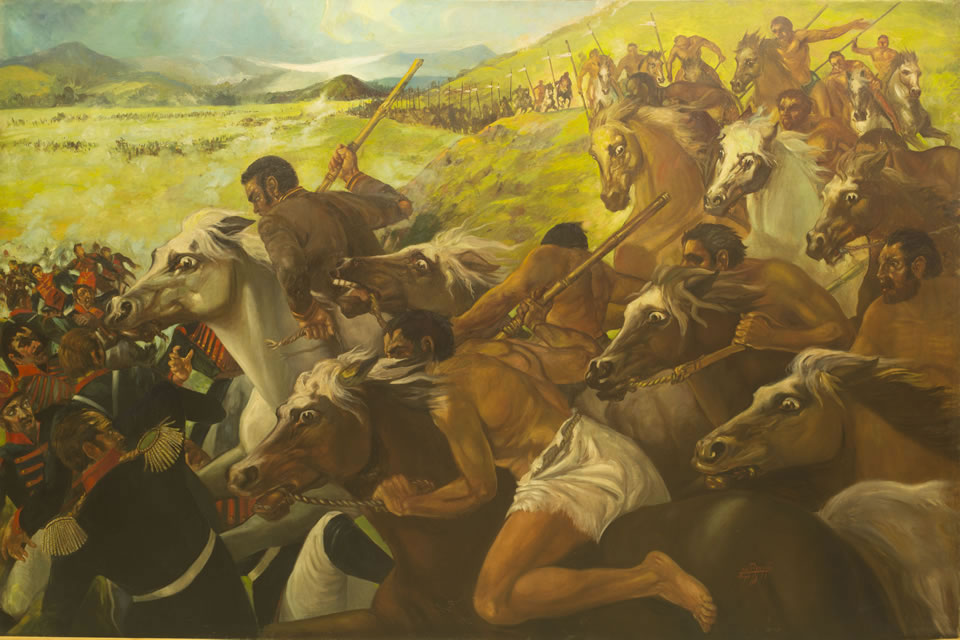
- Battle of Vargas Swamp by Luis Rengifo
Date	July 25, 1819
Location	near Paipa, Tunja Province, Viceroyalty of New Granada 5°44′15″N 73°4′30″W
Result	Patriot victory

Belligerents
Kingdom of Spain	Venezuela New Granada: British Legions

Commanders and leaders
José María Barreiro; Francisco Jiménez; Sebastian Diaz; Nicolás López	Simón Bolívar; José Antonio Anzoátegui; Manuel Manrique; Francisco de Paula Santander; James Rooke (DOW)

Strength
1,800; 1,300 infantry 500 cavalry	2,400; 2,000 infantry 400 cavalry

Casualties and losses
140 – 500 dead	183 – 400 dead

The Battle of Vargas Swamp (Spanish: Batalla del Pantano de Vargas) fought on July 25, 1819, was an engagement of Bolívar's campaign to liberate New Granada. The battle involved a joint Venezuelan and Neogranadine army commanded by General Simón Bolívar against the III Division of the Spanish Royalist Army commanded by Colonel José María Barreiro. The Battle of Vargas Swamp is considered one of the most important battles of the Colombian War of Independence, as it cleared the path for the Patriot army to advance towards Santafé de Bogotá, while also demoralizing the Royalist troops. Vargas Swamp was also the bloodiest battle of the 1819 New Granadan liberation campaign.

The battle came as a result of Bolívar trying to outflank Spanish forces by capturing the provincial capital of Tunja through the Toca road, doing this would enable the Patriots to cut off the Spanish army's supply and communication lines to Santafe de Bogotá, while also allowing the Patriots to gain the lead in the race to capture the lightly defended viceregal capital. The Royalists however caught wind of this plan and placed their forces on favorable ground in order to block them near a chokepoint between the towns of Tibasosa and Paipa. The battle lasted 6 hours, with the Royalist army having the advantage of being on higher ground as well as better equipment and better training.

This battle was difficult for Bolívar's forces who by 5pm looked like they would lose, with the Royalists almost encircling and destroying the Patriots. However a cavalry attack by a force of Llanero Lancers under the command of Lt. Colonel Juan José Rondón coupled with an infantry attack by the British Legion under Colonel James Rooke were able to break the Spanish lines and force them to withdraw. These actions turned defeat into victory for the Patriots.

Bolívar's army narrowly bested the royalist army in spite of the exhaustion of the troops after climbing the Páramo de Pisba, and crossing the swamp. This battle and the next victory over the Spanish by the Boyacá Bridge secured the independence of New Granada.

The battle was fought in an area between the towns of Paipa and Tibasosa known as Vargas swamp, which now no longer exits.

== Prelude ==
After Bolívar's army had crossed the Andes Mountain Range at the Paramo de Pisba in early July 1819 he arrived to the town of Socha, his army of Venezuelan and New Granadan troops as well as a British Legion were in a sorry state, his troops lacked uniforms and had lost all their horses as well as cattle along with some 100 dead, 500 sick, and a loss of a large amount of munitions. Over the next few days his army rested with the help of the local people of the Tunja Province (now Boyacá Department). Their assistance would be vital as they would provide food, horses, as well as tend to the sick troops, the women of these villages reportedly tore up their dresses and any clothes they could find in an effort to sew new uniforms for the naked army. Bolívar would also be able to recoup some of his forces as a large amount of locals joined his army or were conscripted.

Colonel José María Barreiro commander of the 4,000 strong III Division of Expeditionary Army of Costa Firme, the main Spanish Royalist force in the kingdom, had been garrisoned in the capital of the province, Tunja at the time of the Patriot invasion. Barreiro was surprised that Bolívar had crossed through the Paramo de Pisba especially during the winter rain season. Having heard rumours of potential invasion by the rebels in late June of 1819 he had dispersed his troops to guard the various mountain passes (except Pisba) that he thought Bolívar would take, thus at the time he had found out of the presence of Patriot forces at Socha he only had 1,000 troops with him at Tunja with some 400 guarding Santa Fe and another amount of troops scattered throughout the Altiplano Cundiboyacense. Over the next few days Barreiro began receiving intelligence reports concerning the composition of Bolívar's army revealing that he was at a numerical disadvantage, however in his letters to the viceroy he expressed confidence in his forces as they were better equipped, better armed, and had formal military training compared to mixed group of soldiers and peasants that made up Bolívar's forces.

During the following days leading up to the battle small detachments of the Patriot Vanguard clashed with patrolling Royalist troops at the town of Corrales. On July 10, Barreiro now forced to respond, sent a detachment to the town of Topaga and Corrales to block them where his troops would inflict a loss on the Patriots, however this was counteracted when Patriot cavalry forced them back to Corrales. The two armies would clash again at the Battle of Gámeza on July 11, which was indecisive for both sides. As a result of this, Bolívar realized that he was still not strong enough to face Barreiro in an open battle and discarded his initial strategy of a frontal assault on the town of Sogamoso, instead opting for a flanking maneuver through the Cerinza Valley with Barreiro falling back towards the town of Paipa to block him.

== Battle ==
=== Preparations ===

Map showing the routes taken by the Patriot and Royalist Armies during the battle.

From their camp in Bonza, on July 20, after a brief rest, the Patriot army resumed their campaign with Bolívar's main goal being the capture of the provincial capital of Tunja through the Toca road which would enable the Patriots to cut off the royalists' line of communication with Santa Fe, while also allowing them to gain the lead in the race to capture the viceregal capital. For this reason, Bolívar decided to march on the Tibasosa-Paipa road, in order to surprise the Royalists at Paipa. To do this, the Patriot army would have to cross the Chicamocha River, which was swollen as a result of the winter rain season. On the 22nd, the British Legion (which had crossed the Andes between July 14 and 15) finally rejoined his army.

The days of July 23 and 24 were dedicated to the construction of rafts to ford the river with this being completed by end of the 24th. With these completed on July 25, at five in the morning, the army began their crossing of the Chicamocha and decided to ford the river at a site known as Puente de Balsa.

However during the crossing many of the rafts collapsed, and the Patriot army struggled to get across the swollen river and would not do so until 10 am, a delay of 5 hours, which Bolívar worried would allow the Royalists to know their movements. During the delay, Bolívar dispatched a group of 40 infantrymen of the Cazadores battalion with the mission of conducting reconnaissance as well as stalking royalist troops. These infantrymen would position themselves on a hill near Vargas Swamp called Cruz de Murcia. Prior to this, from his camp near Paipa, Barreiro had been suspecting a Patriot move but could not confirm where it would take place he expressed these feelings in a letter he wrote to Viceroy Juan de Sámano in Santa Fe informing him of that a battle was imminent stating in an excerpt from the letter.

.....After dawn or before If the enemy moves, we will undertake the clash that must decide our luck.

- God keep Your Excellency many years. Boncita Field, one and a half hours away from Paipa. July 20, 1819 at eight at night. Your Excellency Colonel. — José Maria Barreyro.

When the patriots became delayed because of the collapse of their rafts, spies informed Barreiro of this around 7 to 8am. Upon hearing this information he ordered that the King's 1st infantry battalion as well as other squadrons march at once towards the area of Vargas Swamp. This Royalist Vanguard marched down the road that crossed the Salitre bridge and continued their march towards the swamp, at 10 am they encountered the 40 Patriot infantry that had taken up positions at the Cruz Murcia, and thanks to their superior numbers annihilated the Patriot infantry and continued their march. The Royalist vanguard arrived at Vargas Swamp and took up positions on Picacho and Cangrejo hills, in order to block the Patriots' passage through the chokepoint at the Varguitas ravine and the path that bordered the swamp. Barreiro arrived at 11 am with the rest of the army and placed more forces on the hill while keeping his cavalry in the reserve near his headquarters at the Casa de la Seis Ventanas and awaited the arrival of the Patriot army.

=== Battle ===
Bolívar and the Patriot army were finally able to ford the river around 10 am and reached the area of Vargas swamp around noon, where he was informed of the defeat of the advance force, at the same time his troops spotted the presence of Royalist troops on top of Picacho hill. Having nowhere to retreat, with the Royalist Army blocking his way forward and the swollen Chicamocha River to his back, the Patriot army were forced to do battle.

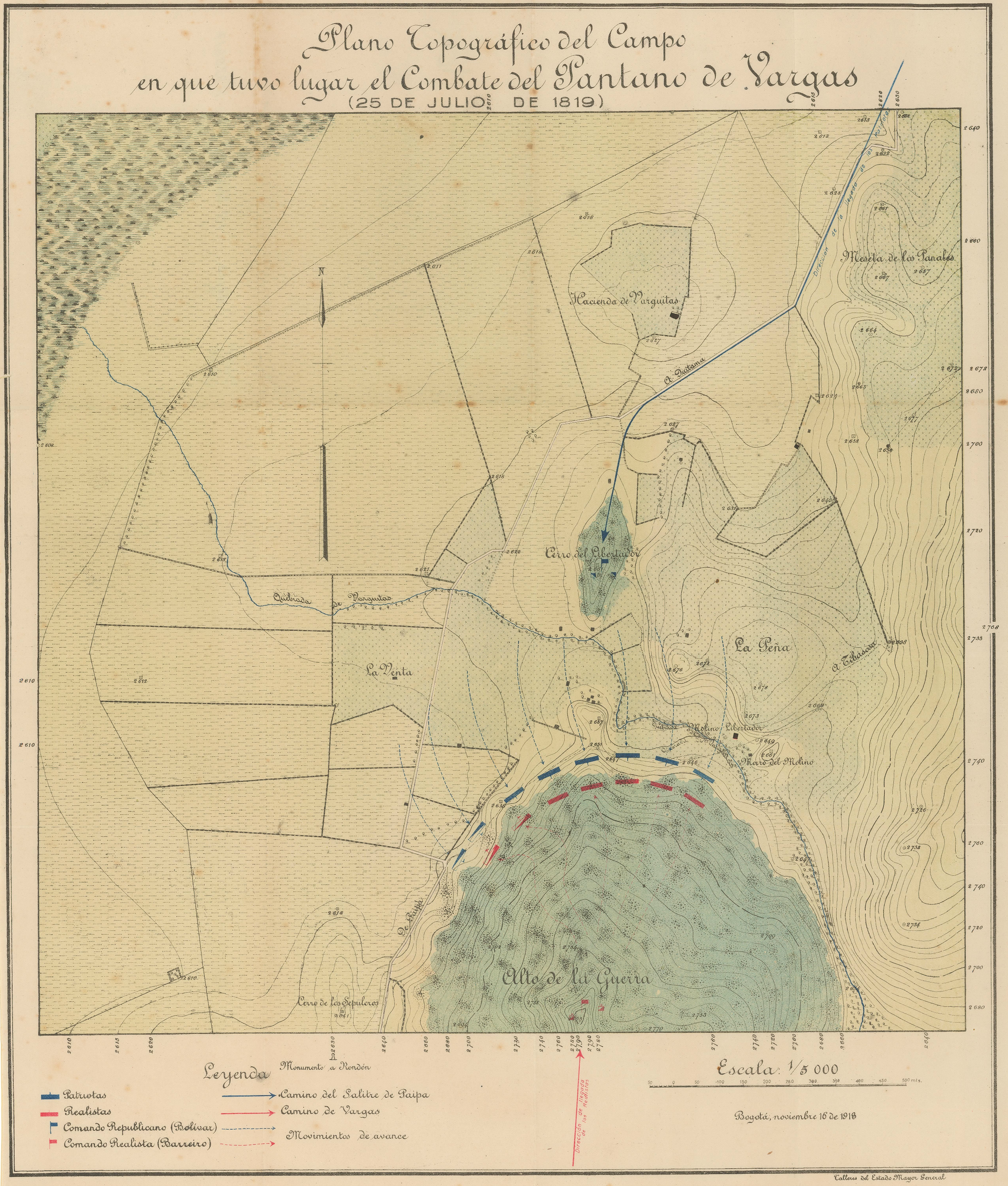
A map detailing the battle

Bolívar's strategy was aimed at taking over Picacho hill through an advance of the vanguard commanded by Brigadier General Francisco de Paula Santander who deployed the Cazadores battalion under the command of Colonel Joaquín París, this effort would be the left flank of his army. Meanwhile Brigadier General José Antonio Anzoátegui, in command of the rearguard, would attack Cangrejo hill; Colonel Arthur Sandes, commander of the Rifles Battalion, would advance on the right wing; the Barcelona Battalion, led by Colonel Ambrosio Plaza, would be located in the center; and in the reserve would be the 1st of the Line, Bravos of Páez, the British Legion as well as the cavalry would be kept in the reserve under Bolívar's direct command.

The Rifles, Barcelona, and Cazadores battalion began their assault marching past the Varguitas ravine and ascending the steep slope that faced the ravine. Barreiro observing this movement ordered Colonel Nicolás López to conduct a flanking manevour with the King's 1st battalion on the Patriot left wing where the Cazadores battalion was located; and that the Tambo Battalion, commanded by his second in command Colonel Francisco Jiménez, conduct a frontal charge simultaneously in the center and the left wing.

The Royalist charge managed to fend off the Patriots and pushed them back towards the Varguitas ravine. Bolívar seeing his troops being pushed back then ordered the 1st of the Line infantry battalion under Colonel Antonio Obando to support the Patriot line. With these reinforcements the Patriots assaulted the hills once again and were able to retake their lost positions while also forcing the Royalists to fall back to their initial positions.

Barreiro counteracted and ordered Colonel Juan Tolrá to take part of the Numancia Battalion, and support López and Jiménez. This action stopped the Patriot advance as both sides fought centimeter by centimeter to maintain their position on the hills, the fighting on Picacho hill was especially brutal, with Santander's troops fighting an uphill battle where they suffered tremendously as the Royalists were able to display their superior firepower against them, the clash was so violent that wounded men began rolling down the northern slope, as well as hand-to-hand combat occurring in some occasions. Despite the stubborn Patriot resistance, the Royalists were once again able to push them back down the hills.

Faced with these successive defeats, Bolívar ordered his reserve infantry with the Bravos of Páez, commanded by Colonel Justo Briceño and the British Legion, commanded by Colonel James Rooke to support Santander. The Patriot line then organized itself for another assault on the Royalist positions, on the patriot left flank Rooke led his troops in a valiant bayonet charge against the Royalists defenses on the hills, pushing them back at a great cost and allowing the Patriots to regain their previously lost positions, this bayonet charge also resulted in Rooke being gravely wounded. Seeing that his troops were being pushed back, Barreiro ordered the deployment of two companies from the Numancia Battalion that had been kept in reserve as well as the 4th and 6th companies of the Granadan Dragoons commanded by Colonel Salazar who were ordered to dismount and fight as infantry to stop the renewed attack of the Patriots, also deployed were Colonel Francsico Góngora's Hussars of Ferdinand VII along the main road that bordered the swamp.

The deployment of these units allowed the Royalists to stabilize their line as well as push back the patriots again on the left and center flanks, meanwhile on the right flank of the battle where the narrow path lay that bordered the Vargas swamp, the fight was equally intense, as the troops of the rearguard division, commanded by General Anzoátegui, desperately tried to fend off the onslaught of the Hussars of Ferdinand VII but were slowly pushed back.

=== Final hour ===
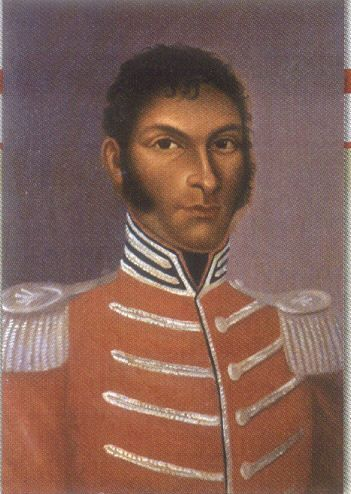
Colonel Juan José Rondón

With the battle now approaching 5 hours, around 5:00 p.m the Patriots were fighting millimeter by millimeter to maintain their positions but were being pushed back again and began to fall back in disarray. Barreiro observing the battle from his command post at the Casa de la seis ventanas, upon seeing his Dragoons plant their standard at the top of Picacho hill reportedly shouted "Long live Spain, not even God can take this victory away from me" and ordered his infantry to conduct a frontal attack along with a flanking maneuver by his reserve cavalry along the main road to finish off the Patriots.

Seeing this distressing situation and now with the possibility that the royalist cavalry would engulf the disorientated Patriots, Bolívar from his command post, on what is now known as Bolívar Hill, reportedly said to his staff "The [Royalist] cavalry has been deployed, the battle is lost" the only unit not deployed by this point was Colonel Juan Jose Rondon's 1st of the Line Llanero Cavalry. Rondón upon hearing Bolívar say this responded: "How can the battle be lost, if neither I or my riders have fought ? Let us make an entrance." With few options left, in a desperate move Bolívar told Rondón "Do what you can. Colonel Rondón! Save the republic!" (Spanish:¡Coronel Rondón, salve usted la patria!) and ordered Rondón to attack with his cavalry.

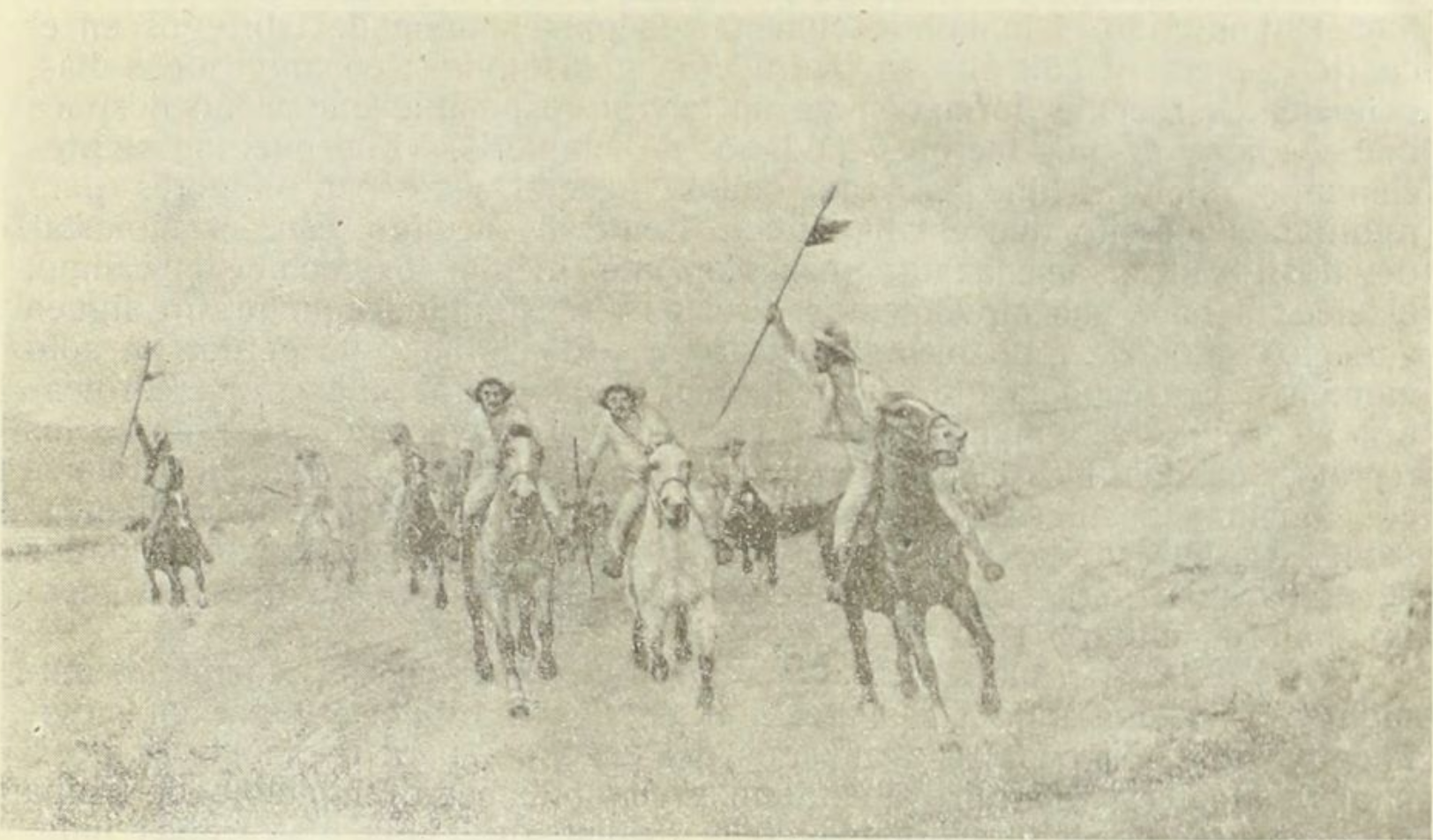
The Charge of Vargas Swamp depicts Rondon's Llano Arriba lancers as they began their charge against the Spanish line.

Upon hearing this, Rondón then rode to his men and called them to attack by shouting "Comrades! Those who are brave, follow me, because at this moment we will triumph!" Only 14 lancers heard the initial call to attack, Rondón then led his lancers in a dramatic uphill charge on Cangrejo Hill, where the Royalist Dragoons and reserve infantry were located, managing to penetrate the Royalist line and wreaking havoc and inflicting heavy damage on the Royalists troops on the hill. Seeing the success of this attack, Bolívar then barked out "Mujica, Infante, Carvajal, now! It is time to triumph or die" and ordered the rest of the cavalry under the commands of Colonels Mujica, Infante, and Carvajal to support the attack. Colonel Lucas Carvajal concentrated his cavalry on the main road and charged against the Hussars of Ferdinand VII. The attack of the Patriot cavalry was so overwhelming that the Royalists were evicted from the road and Cangrejo hill, with a good part of the Hussars of Ferdinand VII, perishing as a result of the attack including their commander Lt. Colonel Francisco Góngora. At the foot of Cangrejo Hill, one of the 14 lancers, Sergeant Inocencio Chincá became involved in a prolonged duel with the Spanish Dragoon, Captain Ramón Bedoya. During their duel, Bedoya managed to gravely wound his opponent with his lance, however the wounded Chincá charged at him with full force managing to stab him with his lance knocking him off his horse and killing him.

At the same time Rondón began his charge, The Patriot infantry inspired by Rondón's bravery led a renewed bayonet charge up Picacho hill from a different flank which surprised the Royalist infantry that had become disorganized as a result of Rondon's charge allowing the Patriots to finally dislodge them from the hill. The fighting was interrupted by a heavy tropical downpour that set in around 6pm, allowing Barreiro to organize his fleeing troops and using the cover of the storm to slip away back to their camp near Paipa. In total the battle had been a grueling 6 hours of fighting, with heavy losses incurred on both sides. A local Presbyter, Andres Maria Gallo, who observed the battle noted "I saw the battle lost at 5, and won at 6."

== Aftermath ==
With the arrival of nightfall and under the cover of the heavy rainstorm Barreiro and his forces withdrew to their original camp near Paipa, while Bolívar remained near Vargas Swamp. Rondón and Carvajal's efforts had been the saviors of the day, along with actions of the Patriot infantry and the British Legion had turned what seemed to be a defeat into a narrow victory. This narrow victory however was not decisive, as the Patriot Army was unable to crush the Royalists allowing them to escape. Although victorious, the losses suffered by the Patriots at Vargas left the army nonoperational leading Bolívar to impose martial law in the surrounding area on July 28, ordering the conscription of all males between the ages of 15 and 40 under the penalty of death.

Barreiro also reorganized his forces and was subsequently bolstered by reinforcements made up of the troops that had still not joined him that were deployed throughout the region prior to Bolívar's invasion. The main priority of the Royalist Army now would no longer be to block Bolívar's march to the capital through an open battle, but to reach Santa Fe before he could and gather the troops that were guarding the capital in order to face him at full strength. The following days the armies observed each other, and would move again on August 3 leading to a clash at the Battle of Boyacá on August 7.

The battle had been particularly bloody for both sides and was the bloodiest battle of Bolívar's campaign to liberate New Granada. In the report prepared by Colonel Manuel Manrqiue, the Patriots claimed having suffered 140 casualties while inflicting on the Royalists some 500 dead or wounded. The Patriots also claimed the capture of various muskets, lances, bugles, as well as 2 standards of the Regiment of Granadan Dragoons. Various patriot officers were wounded in the battle, the most senior Patriot officer to die was Colonel James Rooke, commander of the British Legion, who had been shot in his left elbow causing a rupture of its joint, the army surgeon was only able to amputate his arm until the next day. After having his left arm amputated, Rooke grabbed it with his right arm and raised it shouting in poorly accented Spanish: "Viva la Patria!" (Long live the homeland.) The surgeon asked him in English: "Which Country? Ireland or England?" Rooke shook his head and replied: "The country which will bury me..." he died two days later and was buried at a convent near Tunja. Sergeant Jóse Inocencio Chincá would also die as a result of the wounds that he received from his duel with Captain Ramón Bedoya, he was buried in a cemetery in the town of Tibasosa where his remains have remained since.

In his report to the Viceroy, Barreiro stated that he had calculated the loss of 140 of his troops between dead and wounded with three of these being officers. In this same communication he also reported that

"Our cavalry had suffered a horrific fire of which many were victims… Our loss was minor and after the units have passed me their status, I will have the honor of informing Your Excellency."

The losses suffered by the Spanish cavalry had been large, with the same later stating "Many horses were lost during the action on the 25." In regards to the Patriots, Barreiro informed the Viceroy that they had suffered considerable losses, along with this his spies had also informed him that around 190 patriots who been wounded in the battle had died including the "colonel of the english battalion and a colonel named Briceño."

Father Gallo, who had tended to the wounded and also administered last rites to many of the soldiers during the battle, claimed that the Patriots had suffered around 128 dead while the Royalists some 400 dead. Other claims mention 400 Patriot dead and 1,000 Royalist dead with a large number of wounded as well. Modern estimates by historians deduce that the losses suffered by both sides were quite balanced with historian Camilo Riaño calculating these losses being between 300 and 350 for each side, while historian Julio Albi de la Cuesta calculated Royalist losses being between 400 and 500 casualties while Patriot losses were around 300 casualties.

== Investigation ==
The confusing number of claims regarding casualty numbers led a team of archaeologists from the National University of Colombia in 2010 to conduct an archaeological study on the battlefield to determine the number of casualties that occurred. In their study, which took into account all of the claims made over the years, they estimated that there are possibly between 400 and 1,200 bodies buried in the area of the Battlefield. During this study investigators found what they believe to be a mass grave that fits the description of the one Father Gallo had described in his account that was dug and filled with around 600 bodies.

Other archaeological studies conducted over the years found various muskets balls on the site of the battle.

== Legacy ==
Bolívar's order to Rondón; "salve usted la patria" is the official motto of the National Army of Colombia's cavalry branch. As a result of the pivotal role of the Patriot cavalry in defining the outcome of battle, July 25 is also the official day of the Colombian cavalry.

The bravery displayed by Sergeant Inocencio Chincá during the battle made him a hero of the Colombian War of Independence, as a result the National Army of Colombia's Non-commissioned officer training school is named in his honor.

=== Monument ===
To celebrate the 150th Anniversary of the Battle of Vargas Swamp, in 1969 the National Government of Colombia commissioned the creation of a monument to commemorate the battle. In 1970, sculptor Rodrigo Arenas Betancourt and engineer Guillermo González Zuleta created the Vargas Swamp Lancers monument, dedicated to the 14 "immortal" llanero lancers. The monument is located on top of Cangrejo hill, where Rondón led his charge against the Spanish. The monument is made out bronze, steel, and concrete and shows the initial 14 Lancers who charged the Royalist line.

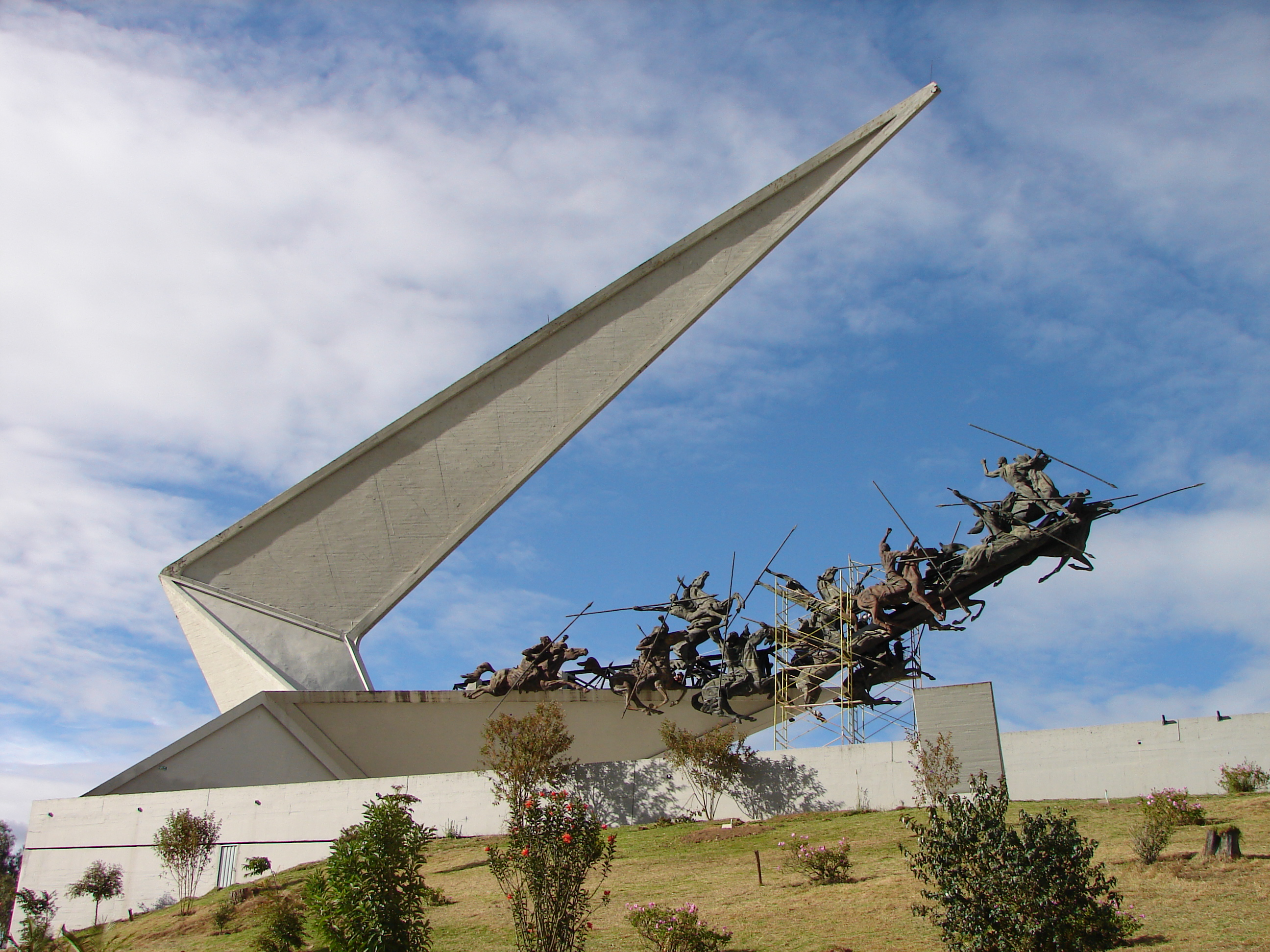
Monument to the 14 Lancers of Vargas Swamp
