= Vargas Swamp Lancers =

Colombian national monument

Coordinates: 5°44′15″N 73°04′30″W

- Monumento a los Lanceros
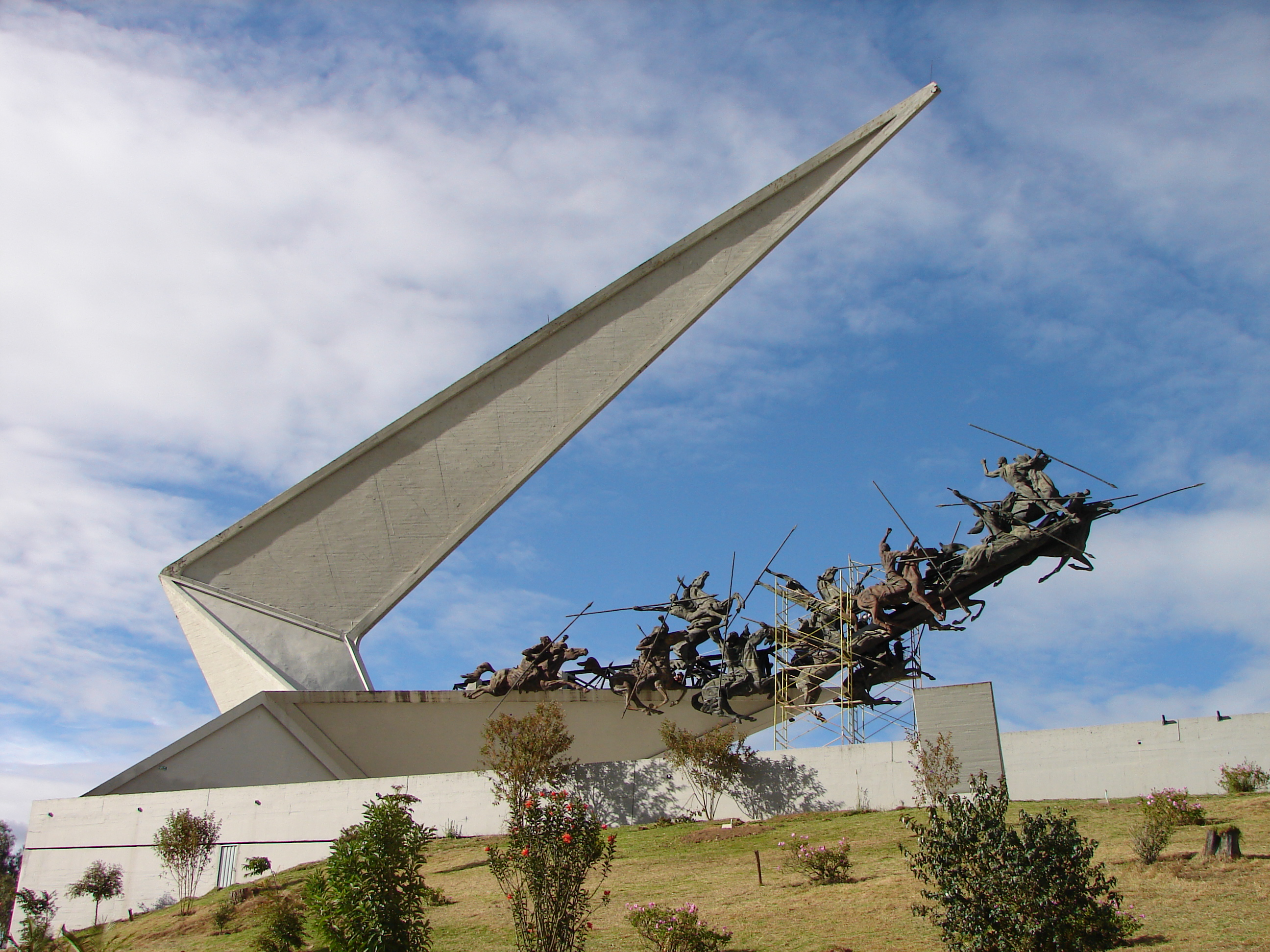
- Artist: Rodrigo Arenas Betancourt Eng. Guillermo Gonzalez Zuleta
- Year: 1970
- Type: sculpture
- Location: Boyacá, Colombia

Vargas Swamp Lancers, or Monument to the Lancers (Spanish: Monumento a los Lanceros), is a large sculptural complex created by Colombian artist Rodrigo Arenas Betancourt and by engineer Guillermo Gonzalez Zuleta in the department of Boyacá (Colombia) as a memorial for the Battle of Vargas Swamp. It is the largest monument in Colombia.

This monument depicts the attack of the 14 lancers commanded by Colonel Juan José Rondón. It is 33 m high and was dedicated in the 150th anniversary of the Colombian Declaration of Independence (1970).

== The Lancers ==
On July 25, 1819, while marching towards Santafé, the Republican army of Simón Bolívar, exhausted after passing across the Pisba paramount, faced a Spanish regular army commanded by Colonel José María Barreiro in what would be known as the Battle of Vargas Swamp. Bolivar's forces included the Llanero cavalry squadron of Llano Arriba armed with lances.

The terrain was better suited for the Spanish troops, and Bolívar's army faced adverse odds. After initial clashes between the infantry of both sides, the Spanish cavalry attempted a flanking attack on the republicans. At this moment Colonel Juan José Rondón a hero of the Battle of Queseras del Medio led his small detachment of 14 lancers and charged Barreiro's horsemen at a point where the Spanish regulars were crowded onto a narrow track through swampland. This sudden counter-attack by the lancers of the Llano Arriba squadron, as portrayed in the sculpture, was a decisive point in the winning of the battle. Bolívar's main force moved up in support of the lancers and Barreiro's army, after suffering 500 casualties, fell back covered by the 2nd Numanicia Battalion as a rearguard.

The 14 lancers (15 including Rondón) were:

- Lieutenant Colonel Juan José Rondón
- Captain Julián Mellao
- Captain Valentin García
- Captain Miguel Lara
- Captain Domingo Mirabal
- Captain Caledonio Sánchez
- Lieutenant José de la Cruz Paredes
- Lieutenant Rozo Sánchez
- Lieutenant Pablo Matute
- Lieutenant Pedro Lancheros
- 2nd Lieutenant Bonifacio Gutiérrez
- 2nd Lieutenant Saturnino Gutiérrez
- 2nd Lieutenant Miguel Segovia
- 2nd Lieutenant Pablo Segovia
- 2nd Sergeant José Inocencio Chincá

== The monument ==
The monument designed by Arenas Betancourt and Colombian engineer Guillermo Gonzalez Zuleta, is a bronze sculpture, depicting the 14 soldiers and their horses, suspended in the air and framed in a concrete sculpture.
