= José María Barreiro Manjón =

Spanish military officer

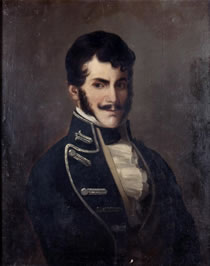
- Jose Maria Barreiro, portrait c. 1818, National Museum of Colombia
- Born: August 20, 1793; Cádiz, Spain
- Died: October 11, 1819 (aged 26) Santa Fe, New Granada
- Cause of death: Execution by firing squad
- Allegiance: Spain
- Branch: Spanish Army
- Service years: 1808–1819
- Rank: Colonel
- Commands: III Division Expeditionary Army of Costa Firme
- Conflicts: Peninsular War; Colombian War of Independence

José María Barreiro Manjón (August 20, 1793 – October 11, 1819) was a Spanish military officer who fought in the Peninsular War and in the Colombian War of Independence. In 1819 at the rank of colonel, he was commander of the III Division of Expeditionary Army of Costa Firme (Royalist Army) in New Granada during Simon Bolivar's campaign to liberate New Granada. He commanded his army against the Patriot Army at the Battle of Vargas Swamp, where he would be defeated, and at the Battle of Boyacá, where he would be captured along with remnants of the III Division and the end of Spanish control over New Granada.

Barreiro would die at the age of 26, when he and 37 other Spanish officers who had been taken prisoner were executed by firing squad in the main plaza of Santa Fe by orders of General Francisco de Paula Santander on October 11, 1819.

== Early career ==
José María Barreiro Manjón was born on August 20, 1793, in the port city of Cádiz in the Kingdom of Spain. His father was artillery colonel José Barreiro and his mother Antonia Manjón Micón. At the age of 12, on January 7, 1806, he enrolled as a cadet at the Real Colegio de Artillería de Segovia (Royal Artillery School in Segovia) and graduated on November 2, 1808, with the rank of sub-lieutenant.

=== Peninsular War ===
Barreiro participated in the defense of Madrid against Napoleon after the Battle of Somosierra in December 1808, where he would be wounded and taken prisoner, however he managed to escape three months later. The Supreme Central Junta granted him the rank of second lieutenant. On May 24, 1809, he was assigned to the 2nd Army of the Right, and fought in Catalonia, where he was promoted to second lieutenant on April 25, 1810, and to lieutenant on the following August 26. He fought in the Siege of Valencia, against the troops of Marshal Suchet, and was able to retreat to Alicante, after the capitulation of that city on January 9, 1812. He was adjutant major of the 3rd artillery regiment (August 4, 1812), being incorporated into the 4th army, receiving the rank of captain on December 13 of that year. He was then assigned to the Reserve Army of Andalusia, and was promoted to captain of Horse Artillery (February 5, 1813), fighting at Pancorbo and in the Siege of Pamplona.

== Colombian Independence War ==
In December 1814 Barreiro was assigned to the 10,000 strong Expeditionary Army of Costa Firme under the command of Field Marshall Pablo Morillo, this expeditionary army was created with the goal of reconquering the Viceroyalty of New Granada and the Captaincy General of Venezuela which had been in open rebellion since 1810. The expedition set sail from Cádiz in February 1815 arriving off the coast of Venezuela in early April 1815. From Venezuela Morillo then took his force to New Granada and began a campaign to reconquer New Granada in which most of the country had been in control of republican forces since 1811. This campaign started off with Spanish Forces putting the port city of Cartagena under siege in August 1815 for 105 days. Barreiro participated in some of the assaults on republican positions during the siege. The city surrendered to the Spanish in December, and in acknowledgement for his actions during the siege Barreiro was promoted to Colonel on December 15, 1815. After the capture of the capital, Santa Fe, in May 1816 Barreiro returned with the bulk of the army to Venezuela in order to fight off a renewed campaign by Simon Bolivar.

=== Commander of Royalist Forces in New Granada ===
When Field Marshall Juan de Samano was named Viceroy of New Granada in March 1818, the III Division of the Expeditionary Army of Costa Firme, now stationed in Santa Fe, was left without a commanding officer, with Colonel Francisco Warleta ill and Colonel Sebastián de la Calzada already commanding the V Division in the plains of Apure, General Morillo named Barreiro commander of the division in January 1818. Barreiro upon hearing this news marched from Venezuela to Santa Fe with reinforcements composed of local Venezuelan troops for the capital, these troops were seen by the Spanish leadership as valuable as the European troops Morillo had brought. Upon arriving to Santa Fe on August 4, 1818, Barreiro decided to organize and discipline his troops, the III Division was composed of some 3000 troops organized into four infantry battalions along with 600 cavalry.

When Barreiro assumed command in late 1818, New Granada had been largely pacified as a result of its reconquest by Spanish forces in 1815–1816 with the exception of small guerilla groups operating in central New Granada, things would begin to change in the coming year. In early 1819, Morillo became concerned about the intelligence reports he received regarding Neogranadine General Francisco de Paula Santander who had been dispatched by Simon Bolivar to the region with the task of organizing an army in the eastern plains region of Casanare.

Morillo ordered Barreiro to conduct an invasion of that province before the winter rain season set in in order to clear that province of rebel presence. In March 1819 Barreiro gathered a force of 1,800 troops and crossed the cordillera oriental and invaded the province, however the campaign was not successful as the lack of supplies and inhospitable climate hampered his force as well as a Santander's strategy of retreating further into the plains. In mid April Barreiro and his exhausted forces withdrew back towards central New Granada and garrisoned in the city of Tunja to wait out the rain season.

=== Bolivar's Campaign to Liberate New Granada ===
With Barreiro's forces back in central New Granada, the rainy season set in, and the Spanish believed it impossible for any army to march under such difficult conditions. However, in late May 1819, after receiving news from Santander about Barreiro's failed offensive in Casanare, Bolívar led his forces from the plains of Apure in Venezuela towards Santander's forces in Casanare to join them and begin their campaign to liberate New Granada.

These two armies would meet in Tame on June 15, 1819, and would march together towards the Cordillera Oriental with the aim of crossing the Andes through the Páramo ("Moor") de Pisba. Barreiro was informed about the reunion of Bolivar and Santander on July 25 and their intentions of penetrating central New Granada, that same day he informed Viceroy Juan de Samano of the situation. This news led Barreiro to consider several paths through which Bolívar could possibly cross through the mountains: La Salina, Paya (Pisba), Pueblo Viejo, Medina, Miraflores, Tenza valley and Cáqueza. He discarded the first four, considering them too difficult and costly in human lives, especially in the winter season. He also ruled out penetration through Cáqueza, because it was located too far to the south. He assumed that Bolívar would choose the pass through the Tenza Valley as the most appropriate and sent a number of forces there to guard the pass. Meanwhile, the only Spanish forces that Barreiro had left on the other side of the Andes was a small garrison of 2 companies; some 300 men under the command of sergeant major Juan Figueroa y Ladron garrisoned in the town of Paya. This force would come into contact with the Patriot Army's vanguard under the command of Santander on July 27 and skirmished with them. Upon realizing they were facing a larger army, the Spanish withdrew towards Labranzagrande where the main mountain pass lay, Figueroa upon this encounter immediately wrote a letter to Barreiro informing him of the situation.

Barreiro's soon found himself in a difficult situation: he did not dare to cross the mountain range and attack Bolívar, because he feared opening any other passage for him on a front that extended almost 250 kilometers. Furthermore, he did not see the possibility of maintaining his troops on the other side of the mountains, practically cut off from Tunja and the capital. He therefore chose to wait, while alarming and contradictory reports arrived such as one that informed that Bolívar was going to meet Páez in Píedecuesta. Barreiro then ordered his forces to gather, as he had previously stationed them at widely dispersed points.

Finally, on July 5 he received news that 500 cattle were spotted being led from Paya to Pisba and on the 6th, that the enemy army had moved towards the moor towards Pisba and Socotá. When Bolivar had arrived in Socha on July 6 his army was in a weakened state and at its most vulnerable, however Barreiro preferred to stay garrisoned and concentrate his forces as they were still trickling in. Viceroy Samano grew frustrated with this approach and decided to relieve Barreiro of his command and replace him with Colonel Sebastián de la Calzada, who was commander of the 400 strong European Aragon Battalion which guarded Santa Fe, as commander of the III Division. Barreiro however, refused this order as it would "Stain his honor as a military officer" and then informed the viceroy that only General Pablo Morillo had the authority to relieve him of his command, thus he ordered de la Calzada to return to Santa Fe when he arrived in Tunja.

At dawn on July 8, Barreiro finally moved his army in the direction of Sogamoso to meet the patriot forces arriving there on the night of the 9th. On July 10 a series of skirmishes and combats began between the two armies at Corrales and Gameza. In his reports to the Viceroy, Barreiro claims victories over the Patriots. On the July 11 a larger battle occurred again at Gameza, during the battle a large group of Patriot troops were taken prisoner, Barreiro subsequently ordered their execution by bayonet in order to conserve ammunition, he justified this in a letter to the Viceroy stating that this action was necessary stating that "The kind of soldiers we have need to get bloodied in order to get fired up."

==== Vargas Swamp ====
After these skirmishes Bolivar decided that a frontal assault on Sogamoso was impossible for the time being until he regained the full strength of his army. Bolivar then decided to perform a flanking action through the ceniza valley, Barreiro upon realizing this pulled back from the Sogamoso area and took the town of Paipa. The two armies would not face each other until July 25. On July 20 Barreiro received reports that Bolivar was on the move again, on the 25th spies informed him of the Patriot Army difficulty in trying to ford the Chicamocha river near the area of Puente de Balsa, Bolivar was trying to march towards Paipa, with the Bolivar's army delayed by the crossing Barreiro moved quickly, his army now some 1,800 strong, to the area of Vargas Swamp positioning his force on the choke point of the main road that was bordered by the swamp on the left and series of tall hills on the right. Bolivar's forces arrived at 12pm and immediately engaged in what would be known as the Battle of Vargas Swamp, Barreiro had set up his HQ at the Casa de la seis ventanas where he observed and gave orders during the battle. The Royalists and the Patriots fought for 5 grueling hours as the patriots tried various times to dislodge the Spanish from the hills and the road, around 5pm the Patriots began fall back in disarray Barreiro ordered a frontal assault along with a flanking maneuver by his cavalry to deal the final blow. Bolivar in desperation ordered the last of his reserve cavalry and infantry to attack the Spanish line, this was spearheaded by Colonel Juan Jose Rondon and his 14 lancers with more units joining alongside them, they charged uphill on Cangrejo hill where the Spanish infantry and the Hussars of Ferdinand VII who had dismounted to help the infantry were caught be surprise and dislodged from the hill this action was done in tandem with an infantry attack on the taller Picacho hill by Santander's vanguard force and the British Legion under Colonel James Rooke dislodging the Spanish forces as well. Around 6pm a heavy tropical rainstorm set in putting an end to the battle which Barreiro used to cover his forces as his reorganized them and withdrew towards Paipa with the Tambo infantry Battalion covering their withdrawal while Bolivar's army returned towards the Chicamocha River. The Battle had been bloody and narrow but a pyrrhic victory for the Patriots, however both sides suffered heavily with the Royalists having suffered 500-400 casualties and the Patriots around 300–400. In his communications with the Viceroy, Barreiro claimed a grand victory over his enemies but stated that the rainstorm had prevented him from effectively destroying Bolívar's forces. However, he informed the Viceroy that he was running low on supplies and requested ammunition, as well as three cannons, to bolster his forces. In the following days, both armies raced toward the capital, Santa Fe.

==== Battle of Boyacá ====
After Vargas Swamp, Bolivar's army had been left non-operational due to the losses suffered and would not move until August 3 after he placed a levy on the local population for men to be conscripted into the army. On August 3, still camped in Paipa the Spanish observed Bolivar's forces near the Chicamocha River near Paipa and then at night observed him by candlelight retreat to his original positions across the river as if he were retreating towards Venezuela. The Spanish then rested unaware of Bolivar's feint, as he ordered a nocturnal countermarch crossing the river again and taking the alternate route to the city of Tunja through the Toca Road. Barreiro would not become aware of this feint till August 5 and hurriedly marched down the Camino Real (Royal Road to Santa Fe) towards Tunja and midday that day he rendezvoused with Colonel Juan Lono who provided him with 12,000 cartridges and 3 artillery pieces (2 howitzers and 1 cannon) and reinforcements, Barreiro's III Division now had 2,670 troops. Bolivar occupied Tunja that same day August 5, upon learning that Bolivar had taken the city and seeing that his line of communication with the capital was cut, he ordered his army march around Tunja through the mountains northwest of the city at night through roads deemed impassable during the rainy season to avoid detection and gain the lead once gain. This march began in the town of Combita at 1 am August 6 and then proceeded to Motavita through a heavy downpour reaching the town at 11:30am where the army camped for the night. Marching through Motavita was considered a wise move strategically for the Spanish, due to its higher elevation one is able to observe Tunja from it. However, Barreiro's movement did not go undetected, and patriot spies informed Bolivar of their movements. On August 7, the two forces clashed at the Battle of Boyaca, early morning that day Barreiro split his forces and ordered his vanguard force to secure the bridge while the main bulk of the army would march not too far behind. Bolivar's forces intercepted them around 2pm of 7 August. Bolivar's republican troops were composed of approximately 2,850 men, which caught Barreiro by surprise and successfully divided 2,670 royalist soldiers with Colonel Francisco Jimenez pinned down by the bridge by Santander and Barreiro desperately fending off a frontal assault by General Anzoátegui. While Barreiro's infantry fought valiantly, his cavalry Company of Mounted Grenadiers (an all-European unit) abandoned the battlefield and fled, his 3 artillery pieces were rendered useless and as only one cannon was able to be armed and fired 3 salvos before its gun carriage collapsed. The battle lasted two hours with Barreiro unable to effectively maintain order as his troops were hammered by a combined Patriot infantry and cavalry onslaught. The battle resulted in the 66 Patriot casualties, 250 royalists killed or wounded, as well as the capture of approximately 1,600 of the remaining royal troops. Barreiro himself was captured by a young boy, Pedro Pascacio Martínez.

Viceroy Samano was caught by surprise when he was informed of the defeat and capture of Barreiro and the army on August 8 as all the communications he had sustained with Barreiro had only mentioned victories over the patriots. Samano quickly fled the capital the next morning August 9 to Cartagena along with other Royalist officials while Colonel de la Calzada and the 400 soldiers of the Aragon Battalion destroyed the gunpowder supply and retreated towards Popayán.

== Imprisonment and execution ==
On August 11 the Patriot Army entered Santa Fe triumphantly with Barreiro and his captured officers along with them, Barreiro and his officers were imprisoned. On 9 September, before departing for Venezuela, Bolivar sent a letter to Samano and proposed a prisoner exchange for the patriot officers being held in Cartagena.

The precarious situation that led up to the execution of Barreiro and the other royalist officers was of vulnerability. Despite having captured Santa Fe, royalist sentiment was still strong in some regions of New Granada, the Spanish still had control over the Caribbean coast with Viceroy Samano in Cartagena and in south as well in Popayan and Pasto. On August 10, Spanish Colonel Antonio Pla and his small force tried to infiltrate the city by entering it from behind eastern mountains through Monserrate, he and his force were captured however. With the bulk of the Patriot Army with Bolivar in Venezuela as he attempted to defeat Morillo one last time, Santander, now Vice President in Santa Fe became worried as he had few troops to defend such a large amount of territory. By October 10, the tension became unbearable, one of the officers tried to escape disguised as a woman. From Cartagena, Sámano refused to accept the prisoner exchange proposed by Bolívar and ordered the shooting of MacGregor's troops captured in Panama and Riohacha. Suddenly, on the night of the 10th, the guard was changed. Two Capuchin friars arrived shortly after telling the prisoners: "My sons, very serious decisions have been made...".

On October 11, 1819, Jose Maria Barreiro alongside 37 other Royalist officers composed of 25 Spanish and 13 Spanish-American were ordered to be executed by firing squad in the main plaza of Santa Fe by orders of Santander stating:

Santafé, October 11, 1819.

The Viceroy having refused to enter into talks with the government, the clamors of the people against the prisoners continued and it was fair to take with them the side that they used to take with our own. I order you that on the day, your excellency, that they be put to death all the prisoner officers of the King's army.

God save your excellency. Signed, F. de P. Santander

Barreiro was the first to be executed, his last words were reportedly "Long live Spain" ("Viva España"). Barreiro's body as well as those of the 37 other executed officers were buried in a mass grave in a sacred ground in the western outskirts of the city.

== Sources ==
- Albi de la Cuesta, Julio (2019). Banderas olivdadas: El Ejercito espanol en la guerra de Emancipacion de America [Forgotten Banners: The Spanish Army during the wars of American Emancipation] (in Spanish) (1st ed.). Madrid: Desperta Ferro Ediciones SLNE. ISBN 978-84-121687-1-6
- Ejército Libertador de la Nueva Granada. Estado Mayor General (1819). "Parte oficial de la batalla de Boyacá, 8 de agosto de 1819". Boletín del Estado Mayor General. p. 1.
- Forero, Paulo Emilio (1969) El fusilamiento de Barreiro en Bogotá, hace 150 años. Boletín Cultural y Bibliográfico Vol.12, Issue10, Banrepcultural.
- Friede Alter, Juan (1969) La Batalla de Boyacá: 7 de agosto de 1819 a través de los archivos españoles [The Battle of Boyacá: August 7, 1819 through Spanish Archives] Bogotá: Banco de la República.
- Gutiérrez Ardila, Daniel (2019). 1819: campaña de la Nueva Granada (1st ed.). Bogotá: Universidad Externado de Colombia. ISBN 978-958-790-122-1
- Moreno de Angel, Pilar (1989). Santander (in Spanish) (1st ed.). Bogotá: Crítica Colombia. ISBN 978-958-42-7692-6
- Riaño, Camilo (1969). La Campaña Libertadora de 1819 [The Liberation Campaign of 1819] (in Spanish) (1st ed.). Bogotá: Editorial Andes.
