= José Antonio Anzoátegui =

Venezuelan military officer

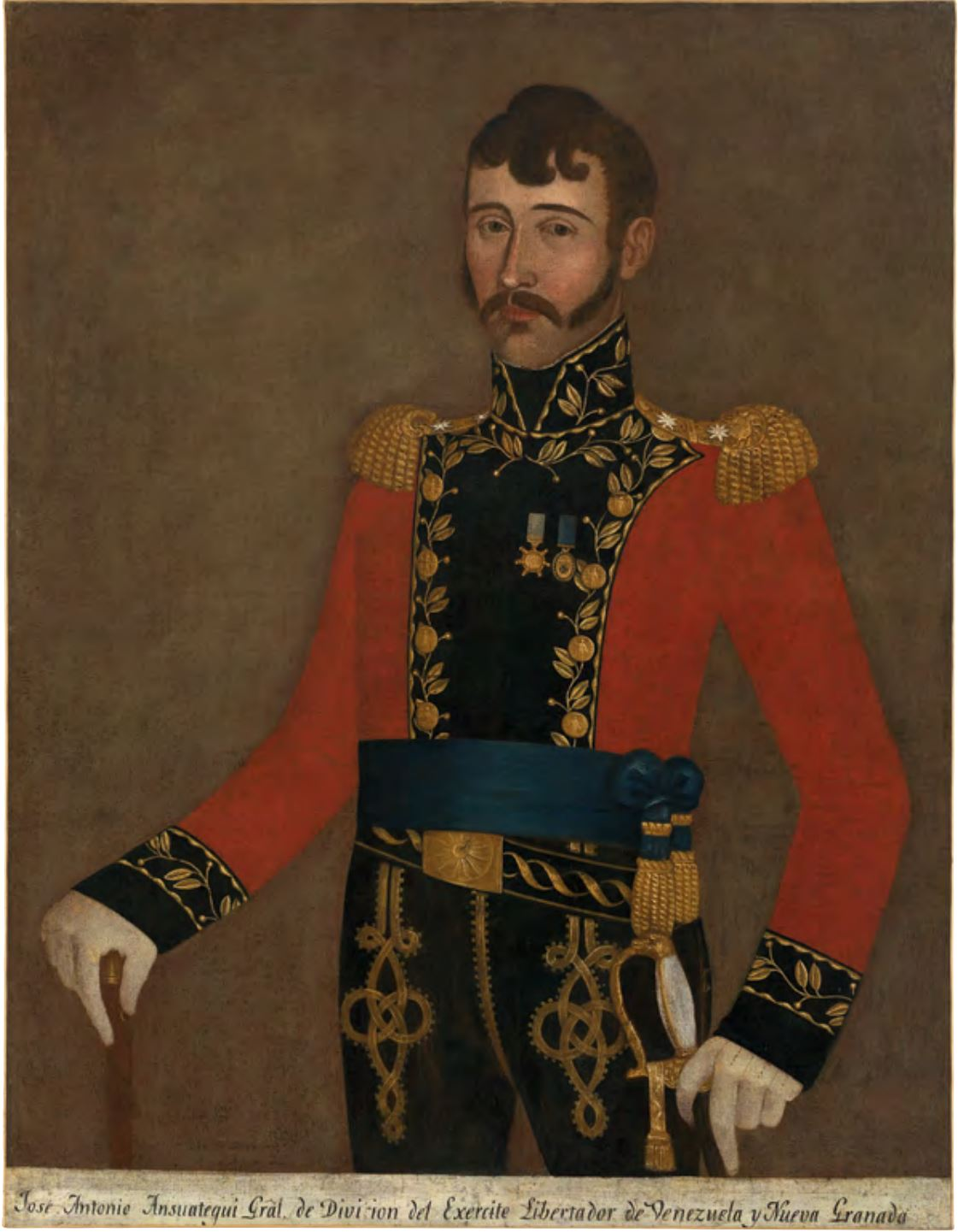
- Portrait of General José Antonio Anzoátegui by Pedro José Figueroa circa 1822. National Museum of Colombia.
- Born: November 14, 1789; Barcelona, Captaincy General of Venezuela
- Died: November 15, 1819 (aged 30); Pamplona, New Granada
- Military career
- Allegiance: Venezuela
- Service years: 1810–1819
- Rank: General of Division
- Commands: Rearguard Division
- Conflicts: Battle of Vargas Swamp; Battle of Boyacá

José Antonio Anzoátegui (November 14, 1789 – November 15, 1819) was a Venezuelan military officer who fought in the Venezuelan and Colombian Wars of Independence.

Born in Barcelona, he supported the Venezuelan independence movement in 1810 and joined the patriot army, one of the first military campaigns he participated in was in the Eastern Campaign led by General Santiago Mariño which saw him reach the rank of captain. From 1813 to 1814, he was present at almost every important battle; such as Bocachico, Araure, Carabobo and San Mateo.

After the fall of the Second Republic of Venezuela into Royalist hands, he fled with Generals Simón Bolívar and Rafael Urdaneta to New Granada. There he participated in the failed campaign to capture the royalist controlled province of Santa Marta, he later fled abroad to Jamaica.

In 1816 he returned to Venezuela, as part of the Los Cayos expedition and was made commander of the infantry troops in Carúpano. He took part in the invasion of the province of Guyana and captured Angostura, which became the capital of the Third Republic of Venezuela. He was a prosecutor in General Manuel Piar’s court martial and also participated in the Congress of Angostura. Upon being promoted to the rank of Brigadier General he received command of the Bolívar's Honor Guard.

Anzoátegui played a vital role in the New Granadan Campaign of 1819 where he commanded the rearguard division of the Liberator army of New Granada and Venezuela and was noted for his active and courageous participation in that campaign, especially at the Battle of Boyacá which earned him his promotion to General of Division.

After the battle Bolívar appointed him as Commander of the Army of the North based in Cúcuta and while; en route to take command, he died at the young age of 30 in the town of Pamplona on November 15, 1819. The Venezuelan state of Anzoátegui is named in his honor.

== Early life and military beginnings ==
José Antonio Anzoátegui was born on November 14, 1789, in Barcelona, Venezuela, to Juana Petronila Hernández and José Antonio Anzoátegui. He was destined to play a pivotal role in his nation's struggle for independence.

=== Role in Venezuelan independence ===
Anzoátegui joined the pro-independence movement early, becoming an officer in the Venezuelan Emancipating Army in 1810. His leadership and military skills quickly became apparent. He was recognized as one of the most distinguished officers of the liberating army of Venezuela, holding the position of Chief of the Guard of Honor of Simón Bolívar, the Venezuelan military and political leader who played a key role in Latin America's successful struggle for independence.

=== New Granadan Liberation Campaign ===
On 26 May 1819, Anzoátegui marched with Bolivar from the Apure Region in Venezuela to the Casanare Province in New Granada to join up with General Francisco de Paula Santander who had been sent there in 1818 to build an army for a military campaign to invade central New Granada and capture the capital of Santa Fe in order to free it from Spanish control. The two armies met in the town of Tame, on 15 June Bolivar began to organize this army which would be known as Ejército Libertador de Nueva Granada y Venezuela (English: Liberation Army of New Granada and Venezuela) he named Anzoátegui as the commander of the rearguard division of the army with his division chief-of-staff being the young Lieutenant Colonel Jose Maria Cordova.

At the Battle of Vargas Swamp on July 25, 1819, Anozoátegui's division was placed in the center and the right flank of the Patriot effort and fought bitterly to hold their line. His men contributed to the victory as they were able to push back the royalist infantry, preventing them from linking up with the royalist cavalry in their attempt to encircle them.

Anzoátegui played a crucial role at the Battle of Boyacá. On August 7 his rearguard came down the Camino Real in direction of Santa Fe in order to reach the Boyacá bridge, they were behind Santander's vanguard that came into contact with the royalist vanguard at the Casa de Postas near 2pm. As Santander engaged them, Anzoátegui ordered his rear guard to turn right and cut off the main bulk of the Royalist Army from reaching their vanguard at the bridge. This caught the royalists off guard and after 2 hours of combat the battle was over, resulting in the complete annihilation of the royalist army.

The coordination between the Patriot vanguard and rearguard had been a stroke of luck as Anzoátegui conducted his operations without seeing those of Santander, as he would confess a few months later saying "because, as all those who know the battlefield will have noticed, the movements of a troop are easily hidden by the bushes and the inequality of the terrain." For their actions Bolívar would promote both him and Santander to General of Division.

Three days later Anzoátegui marched triumphantly along with the rest of the army into Santa Fe, the victory at Boyacá marked a turning point in the struggle against Spanish colonial rule.

== Death and enduring influence ==
After the battle of Boyacá, Bolívar named him commander of the Army of the North which would be formed in Cúcuta. While traveling there Anzoátegui became gravely ill and died en route on November 15, 1819, in the town of Pamplona. His death was unexpected and came at a relatively young age. When news of his death reached the capital of New Granada the authorities decreed a state of mourning for 8 days. Upon hearing of his death Bolívar remarked: '"It is difficult replace with dignity a commander like Anzoátegui ."

== Legacy and honors ==
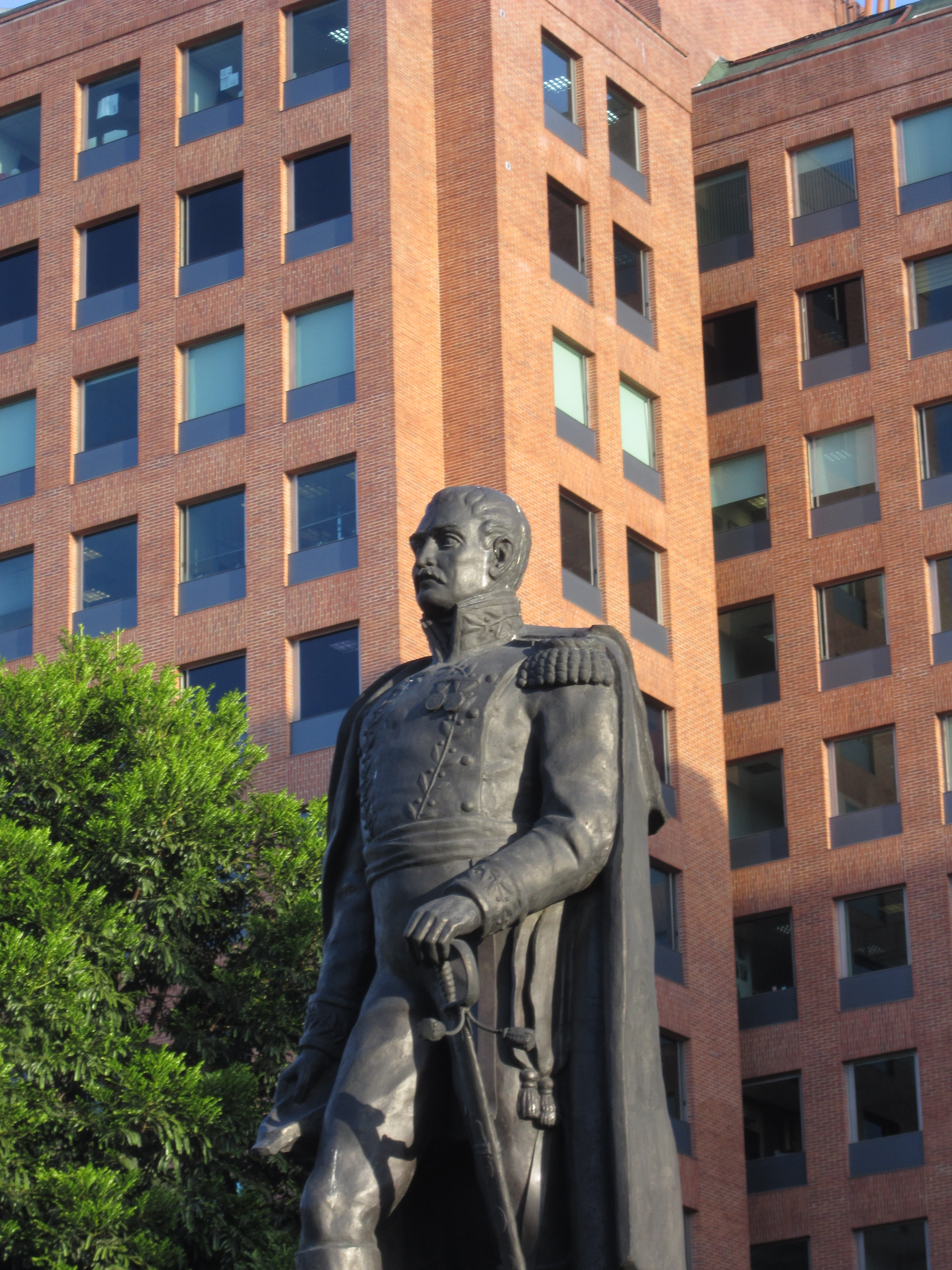
José Antonio Anzoátegui monument in Bogotá, Colombia

Anzoátegui's dedication to the cause of independence was not only significant in terms of military victories but also in shaping the future of Venezuela. His contributions alongside notable figures like Simón Bolívar and José Antonio Páez were instrumental in securing Venezuelan independence. In recognition of his service and sacrifice, the Venezuelan state of Anzoátegui was named in his honor, immortalizing his legacy as a hero of independence.
