= Tibasosa =

Coordinates: 5°50′N 72°58′W

- Municipality and town
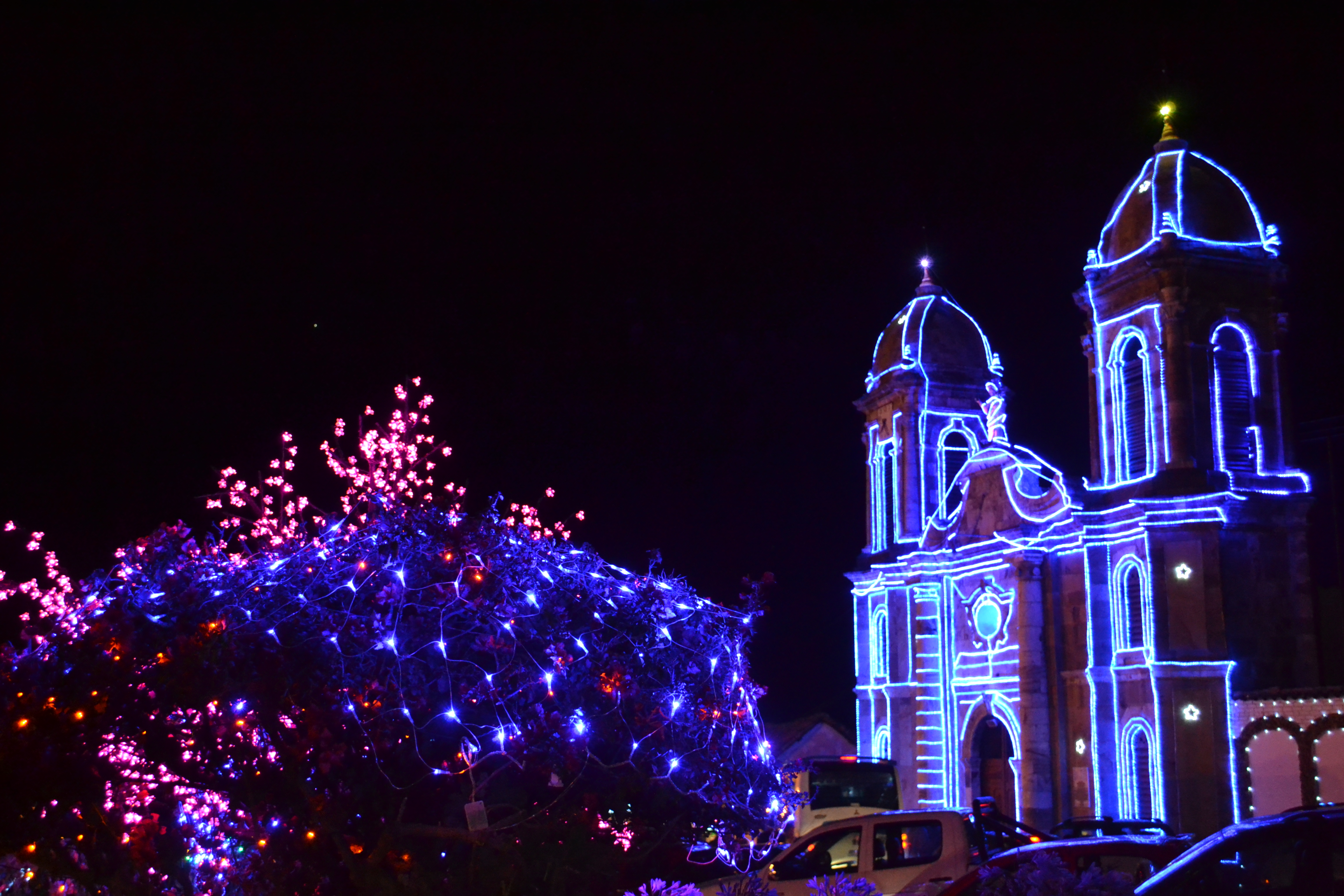
- Church of Tibasosa with Christmas

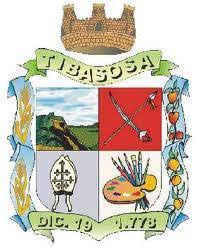
- Flag Coat of arms

- Location of the municipality and town of Tibasosa in the Boyacá department of Colombia
- Country: Colombia
- Department: Boyacá Department
- Province: Sugamuxi Province
- Founded: 19 December 1778
- Founder: Manuel Antonio Flores

Government
  - Mayor: Gloria Cecilia Palacios Guastar (2020-2023)

Area
  - Municipality and town: 94.3 km^{2} (36.4 sq mi)
- Elevation: 2,538 m (8,327 ft)

Population (2015)
  - Municipality and town: 14,063
  - Density: 149/km^{2} (386/sq mi)
  - Urban: 4,766
- Time zone: UTC-5 (Colombia Standard Time)
- Website: Official website

Tibasosa (Spanish pronunciation: [tiβaˈsosa]) is a municipality in the Sugamuxi Province, part of the Colombian department of Boyacá. Tibasosa borders Duitama and Nobsa in the north, Nobsa and Sogamoso in the east, Firavitoba in the south and Paipa in the west.

== Etymology ==
The name Tibasosa comes from Chibcha and means "Chief of the domain".

== History ==
In the time before the Spanish conquest, Tibasosa was part of the Muisca Confederation, ruled by a cacique who was loyal to Tundama and the high priest iraca of Sugamuxi. The discovery and conquest of the lands of this municipality took place in 1537 when Gonzalo Jiménez de Quesada en route to the Sun Temple entered the Iraca Valley.

On December 19, 1778 the Viceroy Manuel Antonio Flórez issued a decree founding the town of Tibasosa, he named a mayor to govern the town. In those days, people from distant lands settled in this village for its climate, also several families of distinguished Spanish origin arrived. Witness to this are the still existing colonial two-story houses with elegant balconies.

Tibasosa acceded in 1781 to the Movement Comunero of Socorro and San Gil, the first uprising in the independence of Colombia. The army left the village to join the troops of general Juan Francisco Berbeo of Zipaquirá.

The population of Tibasosa helped also with the pro-independence cause on the day of the Battle of Vargas Swamp. In Tibasosa Inocencio Chincá died, after being wounded in the battle. On March 30, 1820 Simón Bolívar visited Tibasosa, heading towards Santa Rosa de Viterbo.

== Economy ==
Main economical activities of Tibasosa are dairy farming, agriculture and on a lesser scale mining. Agricultural products include wheat, potatoes, maize, barley, arracacha, ruba, ibia, turnips, peas, beans, onions, apples, pears, prunes, oranges, peaches, cherries, figs and Colombian fruits as feijoa, chirimoya, guama, cañahuate and mortiño. The daily milk production of Tibasosa was 22,000 liters in February 2016.

== Climate ==
Climate data for Tibasosa (San Rafael), elevation 2,548 m (8,360 ft), (1971–2000)
Month	Jan	Feb	Mar	Apr	May	Jun	Jul	Aug	Sep	Oct	Nov	Dec	Year
Mean daily maximum °C (°F)	22.3 (72.1)	22.5 (72.5)	22.3 (72.1)	21.7 (71.1)	21.1 (70.0)	20.6 (69.1)	20.3 (68.5)	20.5 (68.9)	20.7 (69.3)	21.1 (70.0)	21.4 (70.5)	21.9 (71.4)	21.4 (70.5)
Daily mean °C (°F)	15.3 (59.5)	15.6 (60.1)	15.7 (60.3)	15.7 (60.3)	15.6 (60.1)	15.2 (59.4)	14.7 (58.5)	14.8 (58.6)	14.9 (58.8)	15.1 (59.2)	15.4 (59.7)	15.1 (59.2)	15.3 (59.5)
Mean daily minimum °C (°F)	5.8 (42.4)	6.6 (43.9)	7.8 (46.0)	8.9 (48.0)	9.2 (48.6)	8.2 (46.8)	7.2 (45.0)	7.1 (44.8)	7.3 (45.1)	8.0 (46.4)	8.4 (47.1)	6.9 (44.4)	7.6 (45.7)
Average precipitation mm (inches)	24.7 (0.97)	42.4 (1.67)	74.4 (2.93)	114.1 (4.49)	109.0 (4.29)	62.7 (2.47)	47.2 (1.86)	50.6 (1.99)	73.3 (2.89)	111.5 (4.39)	96.3 (3.79)	37.5 (1.48)	843.8 (33.22)
Average precipitation days	7	9	13	18	19	14	18	15	16	18	16	10	173
Average relative humidity (%)	69	70	72	76	77	75	73	74	75	75	75	73	74
Mean monthly sunshine hours	198.4	161.1	158.1	120.0	120.9	132.0	155.0	142.6	132.0	133.3	147.0	186.0	1,786.4
Mean daily sunshine hours	6.4	5.7	5.1	4.0	3.9	4.4	5.0	4.6	4.4	4.3	4.9	6.0	4.9
Source: Instituto de Hidrologia Meteorologia y Estudios Ambientales

== Gallery ==
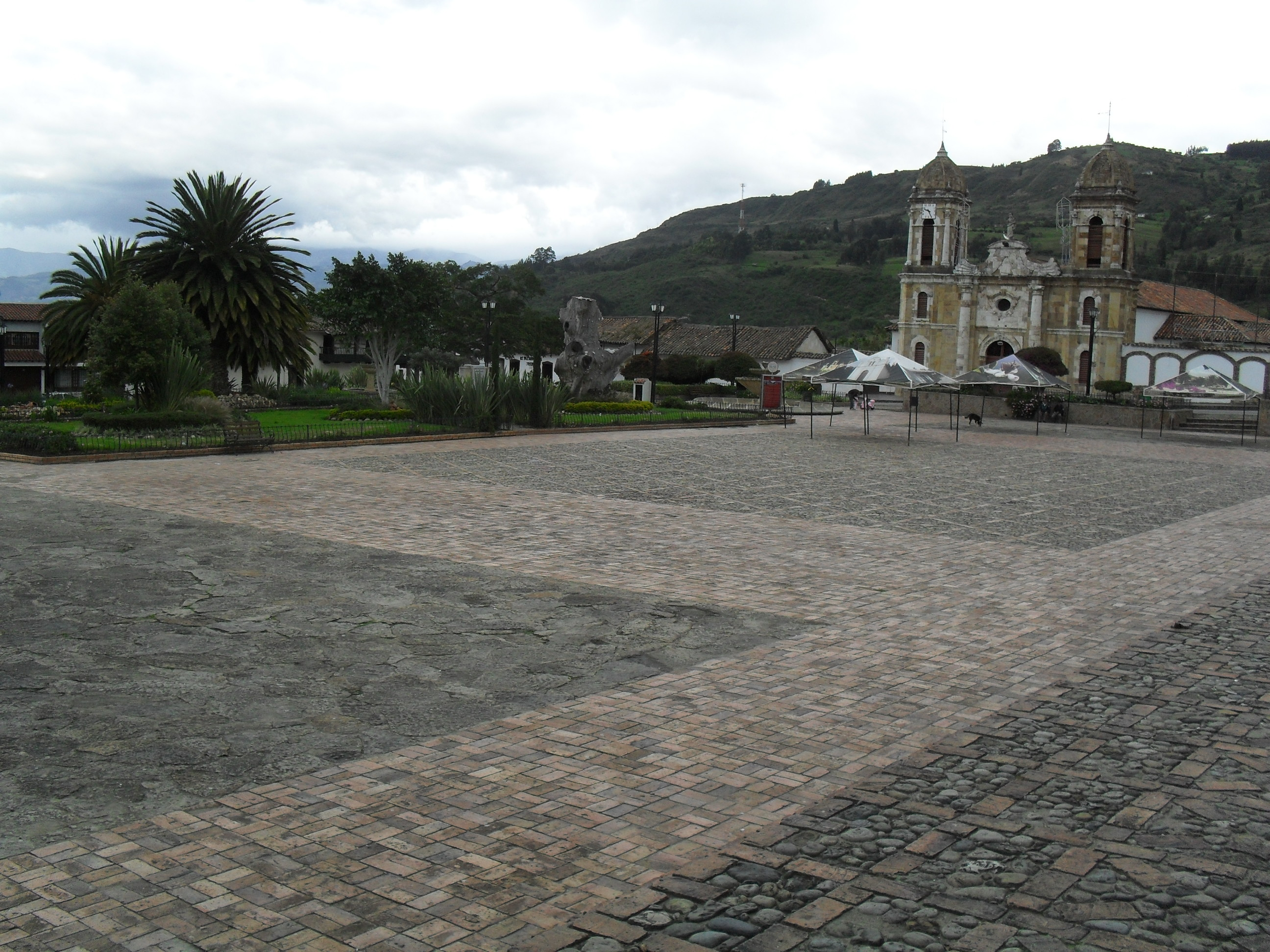
Central square

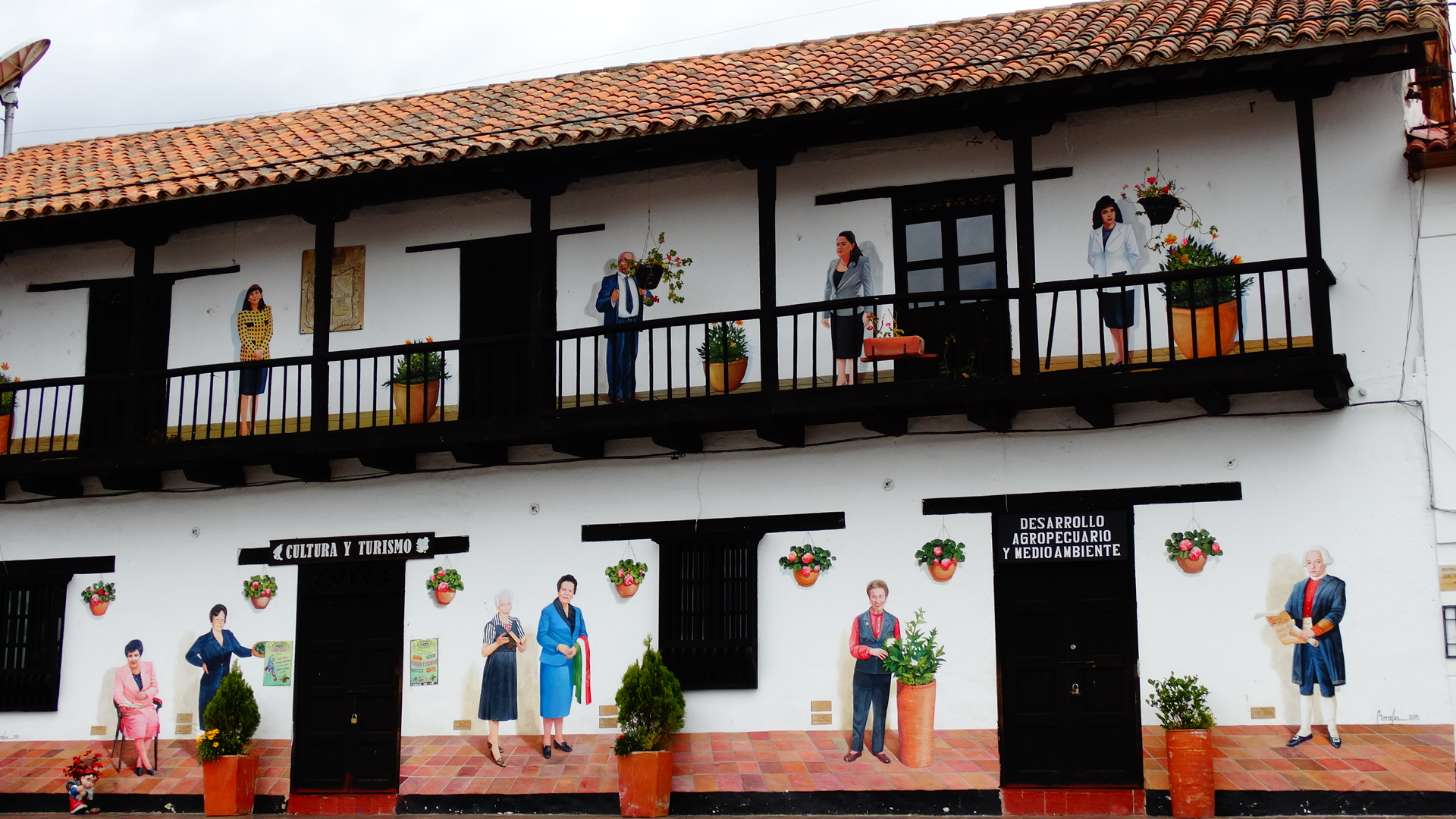
Cultural centre

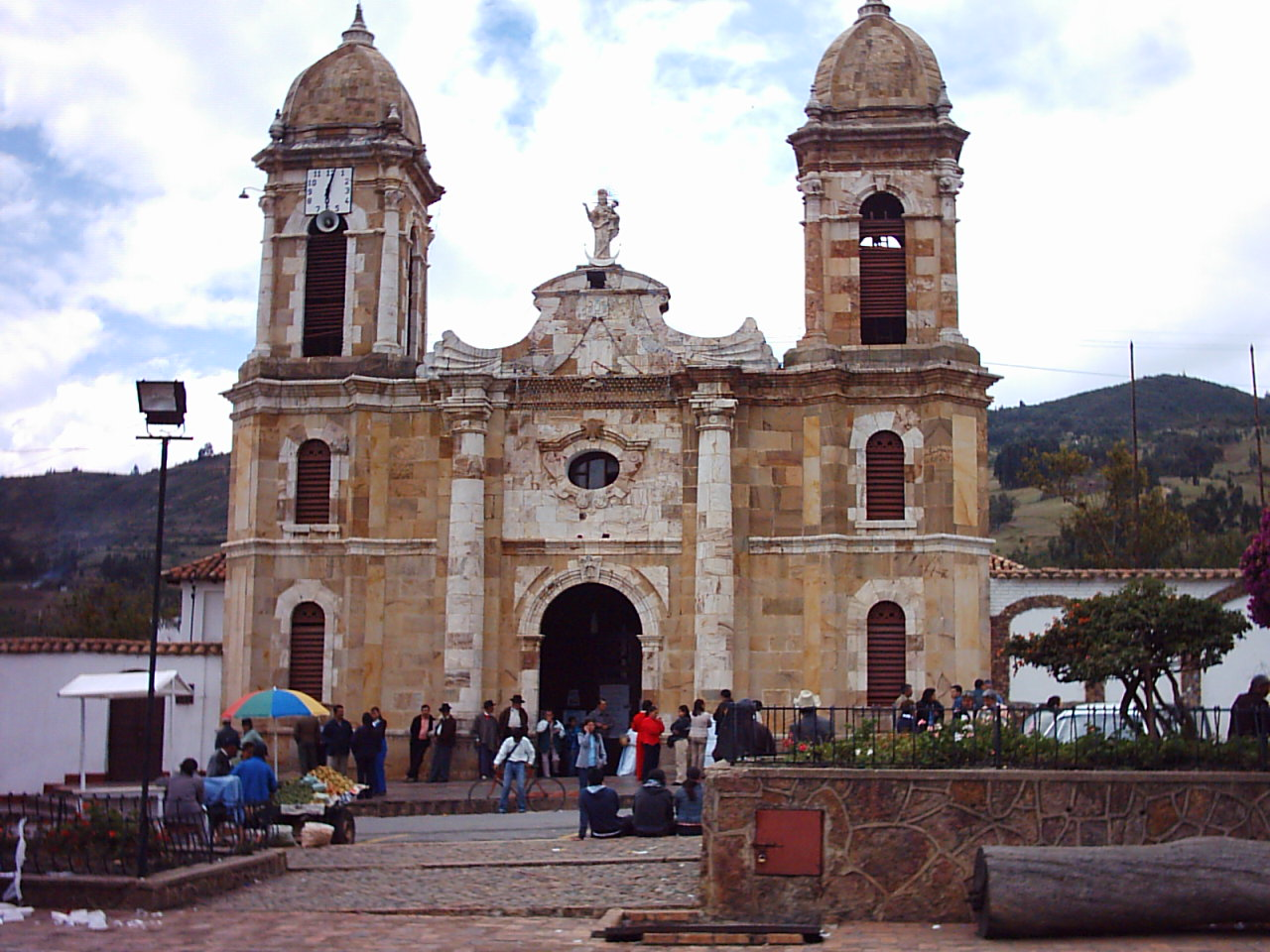
Church
