= Paipa =

- Municipality and town
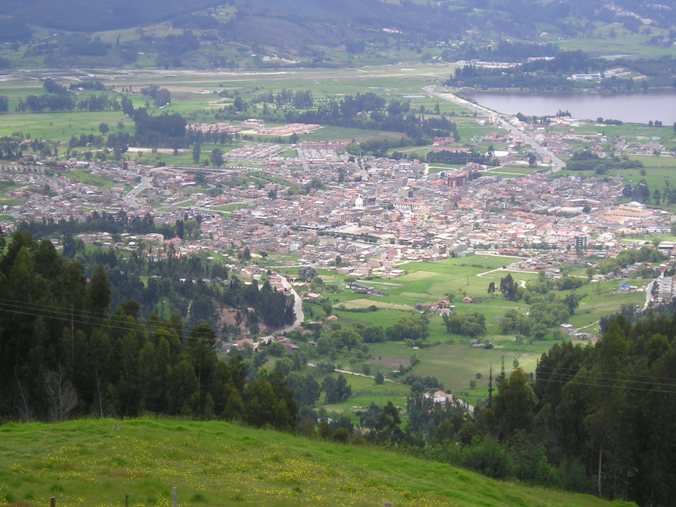
- View of Paipa

- Flag Coat of arms

- Location of the municipality and town of Paipa in the Boyacá department of Colombia
- Coordinates: 5°47′0″N 73°7′4″W
- Country: Colombia
- Department: Boyacá Department
- Province: Tundama Province
- Founded: 19 February 1602
- Founder: Luís Enríquez

Government
  - Mayor: Fabio Alberto Medrano Reyes (2020–2023)

Area
  - Municipality and town: 305.1 km^{2} (117.8 sq mi)
  - Urban: 4.63 km^{2} (1.79 sq mi)
- Elevation: 2,525 m (8,284 ft)

Population (2018 census)
  - Municipality and town: 33,535
  - Density: 109.9/km^{2} (284.7/sq mi)
  - Urban: 20,021
  - Urban density: 4,320/km^{2} (11,200/sq mi)
- Time zone: UTC-5 (Colombia Standard Time)
- Website: Official website

Paipa is a town and municipality in the Tundama Province, a part of the Colombian department of Boyacá. Paipa borders Duitama, Firavitoba, Tibasosa, Sotaquirá and Tuta.

== Geography ==
Paipa is located 15 km west of Duitama and 48 kilometres (30 mi) to the northeast of Tunja, the capital of the department, in the Cordillera Oriental (Eastern Ranges) of the Colombian Andes. It is the main tourist center of the region, with a number of large hotels and hot springs.

=== Climate ===
At an elevation of 2525 m, Paipa has a mild subtropical highland climate (Köppen Cfb) with an average temperature around 14 °C.

Climate data for Paipa (Tunguavita), elevation 2,470 m (8,100 ft), (1981–2010)
Month	Jan	Feb	Mar	Apr	May	Jun	Jul	Aug	Sep	Oct	Nov	Dec	Year
Mean daily maximum °C (°F)	22.9 (73.2)	23.1 (73.6)	22.8 (73.0)	21.7 (71.1)	21.2 (70.2)	20.6 (69.1)	20.3 (68.5)	20.5 (68.9)	20.9 (69.6)	21.2 (70.2)	21.5 (70.7)	22.0 (71.6)	21.6 (70.9)
Daily mean °C (°F)	14.7 (58.5)	15.1 (59.2)	15.3 (59.5)	15.3 (59.5)	15.0 (59.0)	14.5 (58.1)	14.1 (57.4)	14.1 (57.4)	14.2 (57.6)	14.6 (58.3)	14.9 (58.8)	14.6 (58.3)	14.7 (58.5)
Mean daily minimum °C (°F)	5.7 (42.3)	6.5 (43.7)	7.5 (45.5)	8.8 (47.8)	8.7 (47.7)	7.6 (45.7)	6.7 (44.1)	6.7 (44.1)	6.7 (44.1)	7.9 (46.2)	8.3 (46.9)	6.8 (44.2)	7.3 (45.1)
Average precipitation mm (inches)	25.7 (1.01)	47.7 (1.88)	79.3 (3.12)	131.5 (5.18)	125.8 (4.95)	78.5 (3.09)	58.8 (2.31)	62.5 (2.46)	79.8 (3.14)	132.1 (5.20)	107.4 (4.23)	46.8 (1.84)	976.1 (38.43)
Average precipitation days (≥ 1.0 mm)	7	10	14	19	20	17	18	17	16	20	17	11	185
Average relative humidity (%)	72	72	74	77	79	78	76	76	77	79	79	76	76
Mean monthly sunshine hours	207.7	169.4	155.0	111.0	105.4	111.0	130.2	124.0	114.0	124.0	141.0	182.9	1,675.6
Mean daily sunshine hours	6.7	6.0	5.0	3.7	3.4	3.7	4.2	4.0	3.8	4.0	4.7	5.9	4.6
Source: Instituto de Hidrologia Meteorologia y Estudios Ambientales

== Etymology ==
Paipa is named after the cacique (leader) of the Paipa people.

== History ==
Before the Spanish conquest in the 1530s, Paipa was inhabited by the Muisca people. The loose Muisca Confederation comprised different rulers; the cacique of Paipa was loyal to the Tundama of Tundama. Conquistador Gonzalo Jiménez de Quesada visited Paipa in 1539 in his search for the Sun Temple.

Modern Paipa was founded on February 19, 1602, by Luís Enríquez.

Paipa's first building was the church, built where the cathedral stands today, with clay tile, walls, and stone foundations. Initially, it served as a headquarters for police and justice services, and also for tax collection in Paipa and surrounding villages.

On November 4, 1755, Paipa was designated as a Corregimiento, and Don Ignacio de Caicedo was named as first Corregidor. In 1758 he appointed Juan Avellaneda, Miguel Rodriguez and Esteban Lara as the first mayor of Paipa. The municipality boundaries of Paipa were demarcated in 1778.

The first event that led to Paipa's reputation as a tourist city was the arrival of specialists in 1825 to analyze the local mineral waters. Tourist activity began to pick up after 1852 when the central government sent a natural resources committee headed by General Agustín Codazzi.

The construction of the current cathedral in Jaime Rook park began in 1906 and was finished in 1920. The first passenger trains arrived from Bogota in late 1930 and early 1931. Mineral water pools and spas were built in 1938, launching the local tourist industry, which was reinforced by the construction of Lake Sochagota in 1955. In 1960, the Departmental Assembly declared Paipa a "tourist capital".

The construction of the first local coal-fired power-plant in 1953 led to an influx of population from elsewhere in the country. Some of Paipa's historical architecture has been lost as the city has grown, and the traditional colonial main square has given way to modern buildings.

Paipa inaugurated the Monument to the Lancers at the Pantano de Vargas, and the now forgotten monument to Innocent Chincá on North Central Avenue. In this decade, the hospitality industry around the lake began to develop with the first Sochagota Springs Hotel. Before these buildings and municipal swimming pools were built, the only opportunity for residents and tourists to bathe in the hot springs was at a Victorian hotel located in urban Paipa. New urban public venues for music have recently been constructed, such as Concha Acústica "Valentín Garcia", a sports and cultural complex built in 1990.

By 1995 Paipa, like other neighboring cities across Colombia, began to experience urban decay due to national policies seeking to quickly industrialize and urbanize Colombia. In response to this, new housing developments are under construction in the north side of the city.

== Economy ==
Paipa's main economic activities are tourism and agriculture, with livestock and dairy farms as well as farms producing oats, barley, maize, wheat, and potatoes. The coal-fired TermoPaipa power plant serves the entire region.

== Transport ==
The city is served by Juan José Rondón Airport.

== Tourism ==
Places of interest include: Lake Sochagota, the Ranchería nature reserve, the Vargas swamp, the church, the Casona del Salitre and Jaime Rook park, named in honor of James Rooke.

=== Lake Sochagota ===
Lake Sochagota is a destination for Colombians and has started to attract foreign visitors. Activities include water-skiing, kayaking, as well as running and cycling around its edge.

=== Vargas Swamp ===
Vargas Swamp is the location of the Battle of Vargas Swamp which took place on the 25th of July 1819 and was decisive in the fight for independence. A monument to the 14 lancers, by Rodrigo Arenas Betancourt, commemorates the battle.

=== Paipa thermal baths ===
The thermal bath area covers approximately 5 hectares and includes a number of pools, both public and private, as well as hotels, sports facilities, shops and cafes. The water comes from a subterranean lake whose waters come to the surface in this area, before being distributed by pipes to various establishments in the sector.

=== Casona del Salitre ===
Just outside the town is the Casona de Salitre, a restored colonial hacienda, which is a national monument as well as a hotel.

== Notable people from Paipa ==
- Ángel Camargo, former professional cyclist
- Fernando Camargo, professional cyclist
- Wilson Cepeda, professional cyclist
- Flober Peña, former professional cyclist

== Gallery ==
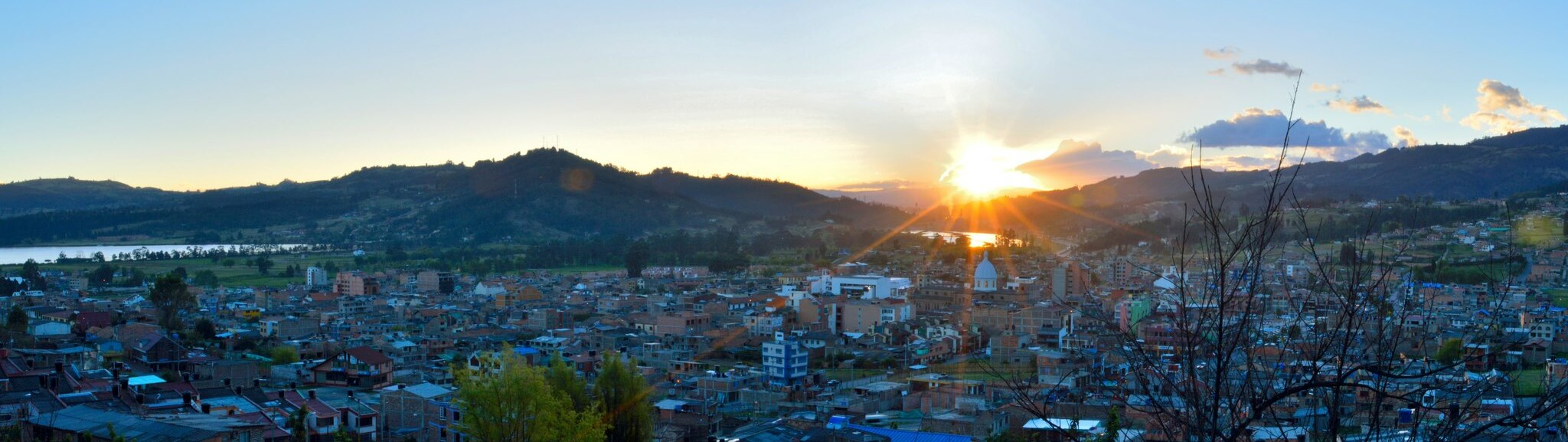
Panorama of Paipa
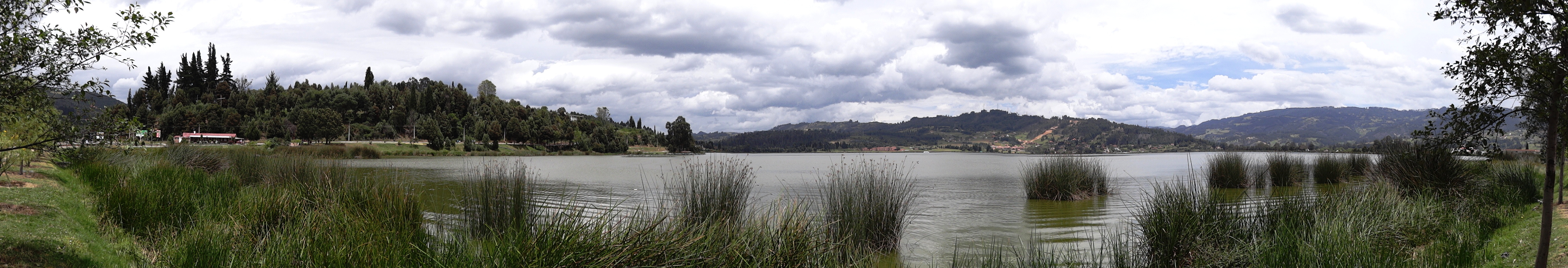
Panorama of Sochagota Lake
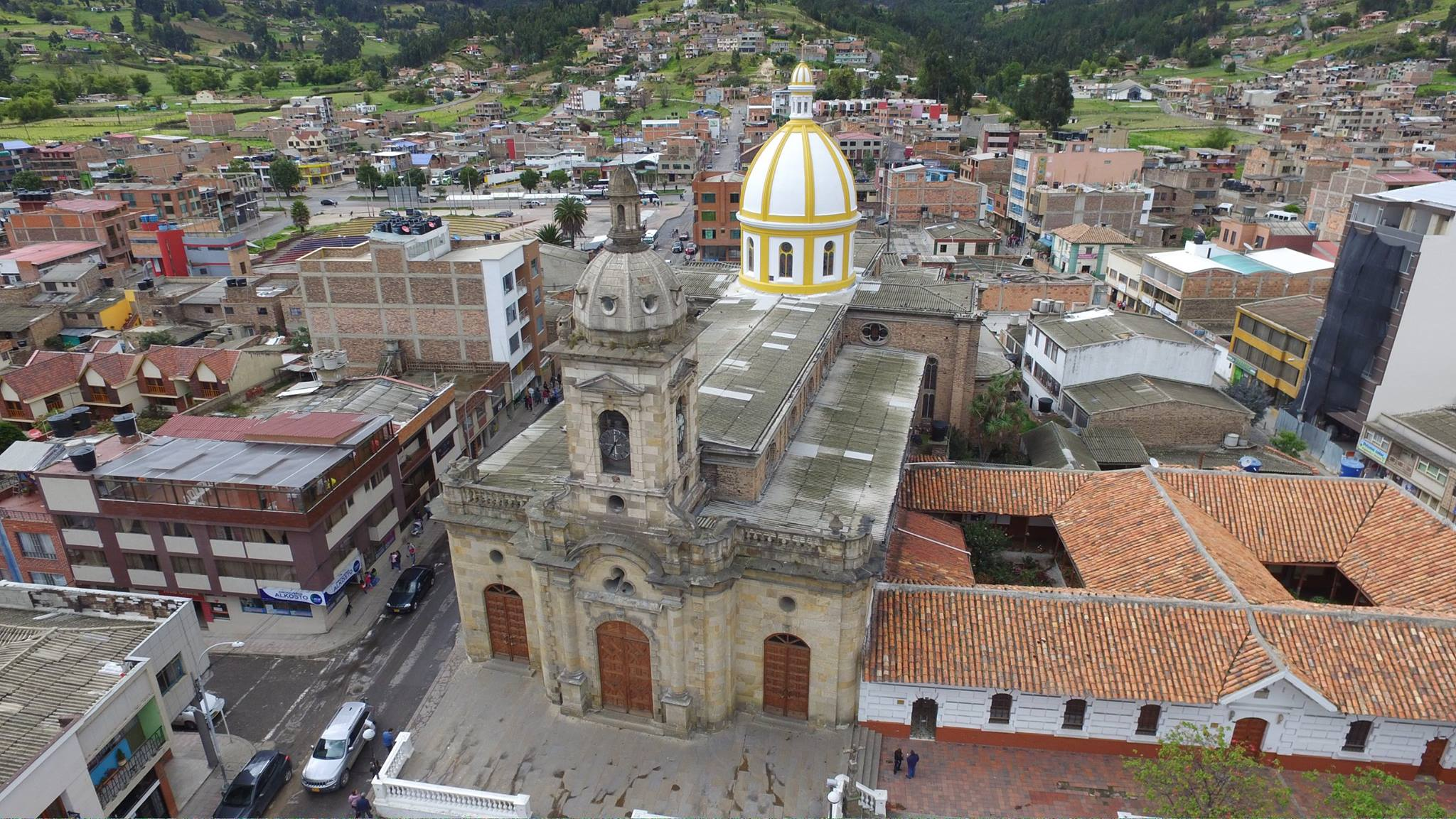
Church of Paipa

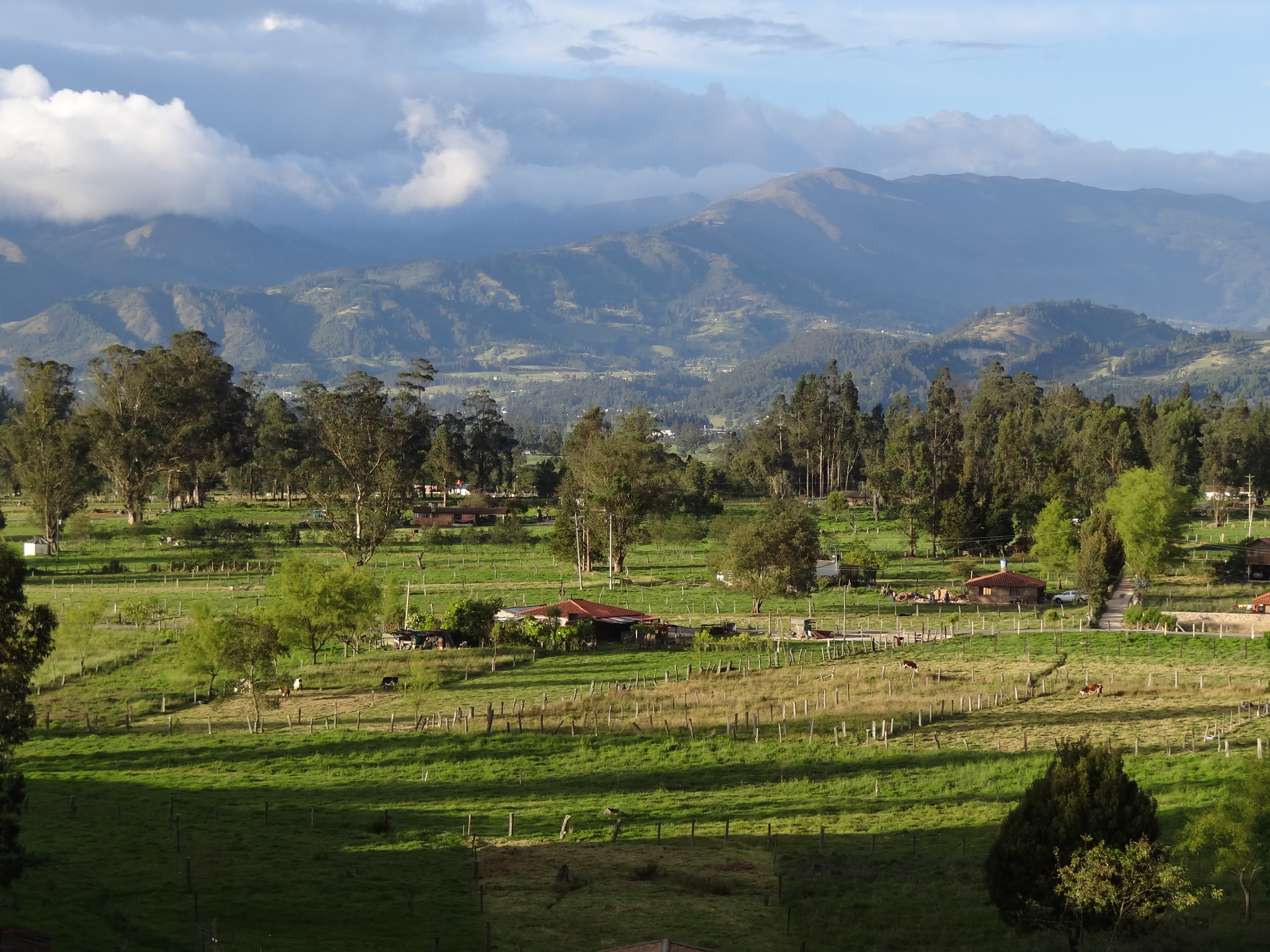
Vargas Swamp

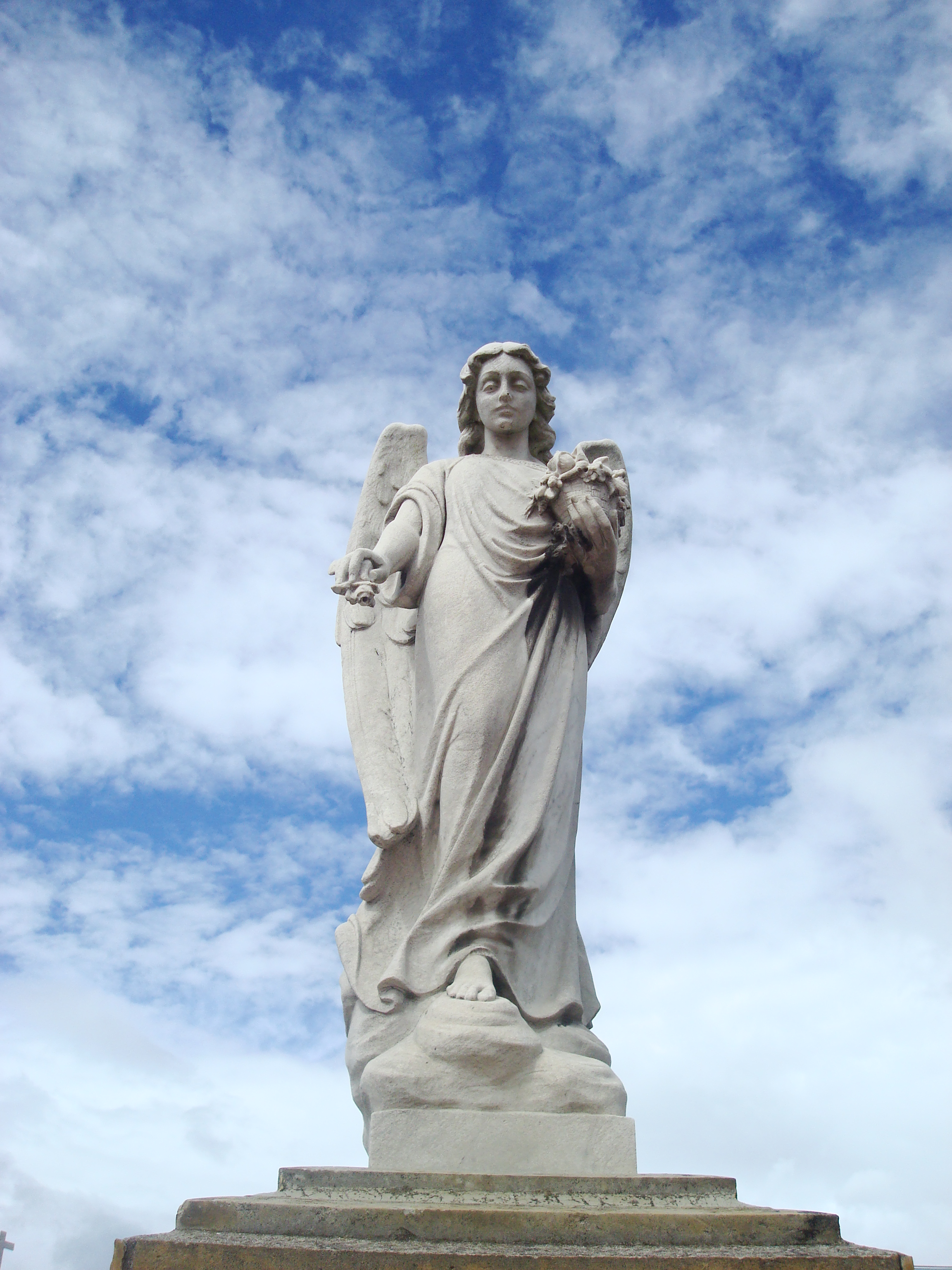
Statue at the cemetery of Paipa

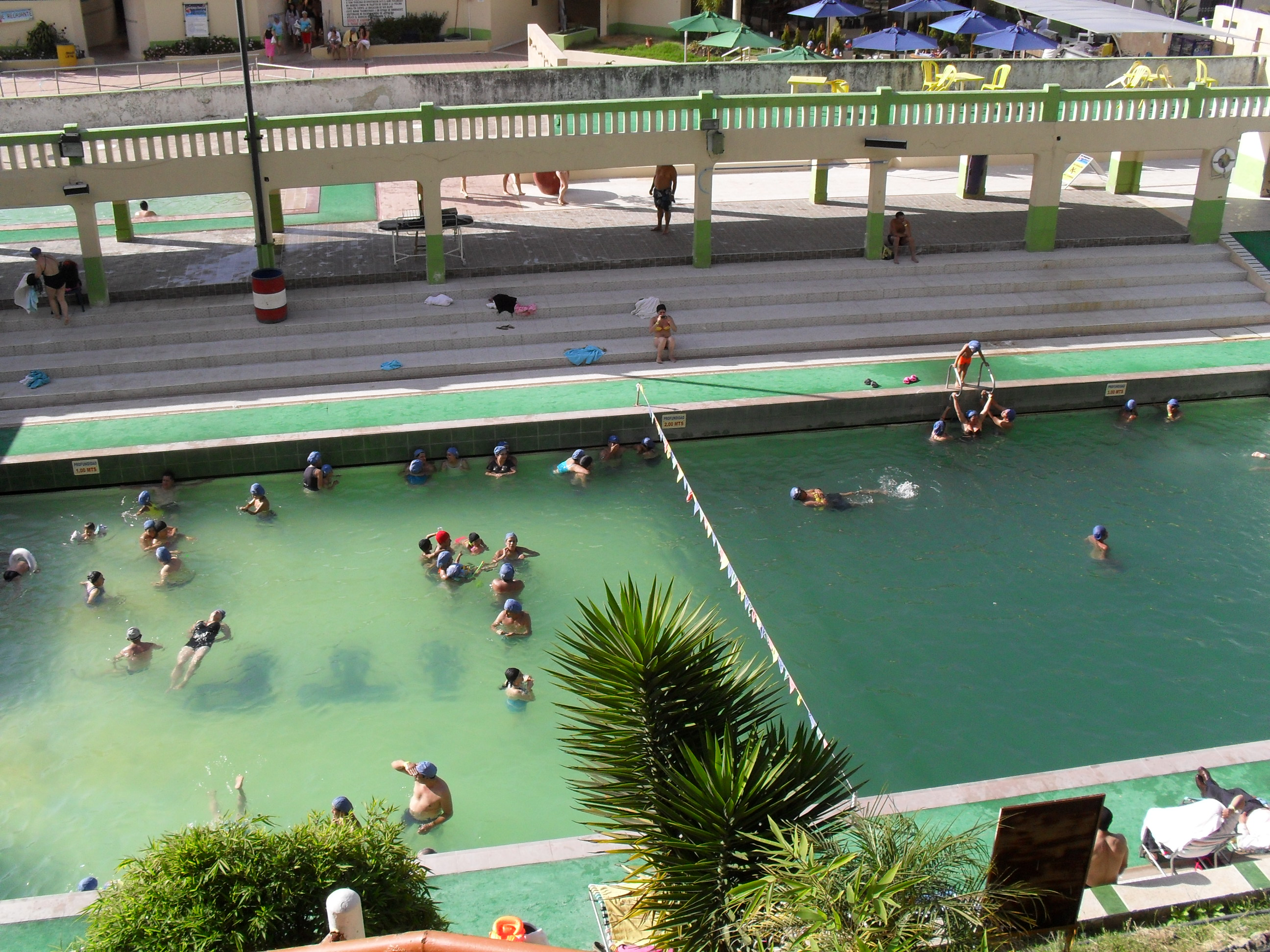
Thermal baths
