= Ramón García de Sena =

Venezuelan soldier, poet and journalist

Ramón Eustaquio García de Sena y Loreto de Silva (c. 1779 - 1814) was a Venezuelan soldier, poet and journalist who fought in Venezuelan war of independence.

== History ==
García de Sena was born c. 1779 in La Victoria, Aragua to Ramón García de Sena y Rodríguez. García de Sena was the brother of Venezuelan translator Manuel García de Sena. He was a cadet in an Aragua militia battalion in 1802 under Bernardo Rodríguez del Toro Ascanio, the father-in-law of Simón Bolívar He was a cadet of the Milicias Disciplinadas de Blancos de los valles de Aragua in 1802. García de Sena joined the Venezuelan independence movement alongside his family, becoming secretary of War and Navy of the First Republic of Venezuela in 1812 when he held the rank of second lieutenant. García de Sena was reinstated to his position the year after, during the Second Republic of Venezuela.

On September 13, 1813 he defeated royalist coronel José Ceballos in the Battle of Cerritos Blancos. Following the Battle of Araure on December 5, García de Sena was sent as a coronel to Barinas with abundant munitions, 500 infantrymen and, 400 lancers, among which was soon-to-be Venezuelan president José Antonio Páez. From January 12 to January 19, 1814, García de Sena lead the defense of Barinas against the ongoing siege by royalist chieftain Antonio Puig (or Puy). Following his defeat, he retreated from the city. García de Sena died on June 15, 1814 in the Second Battle of La Puerta.
