= Portuguesa (state) =

Portuguesa State Estado Portuguesa
- State of Venezuela
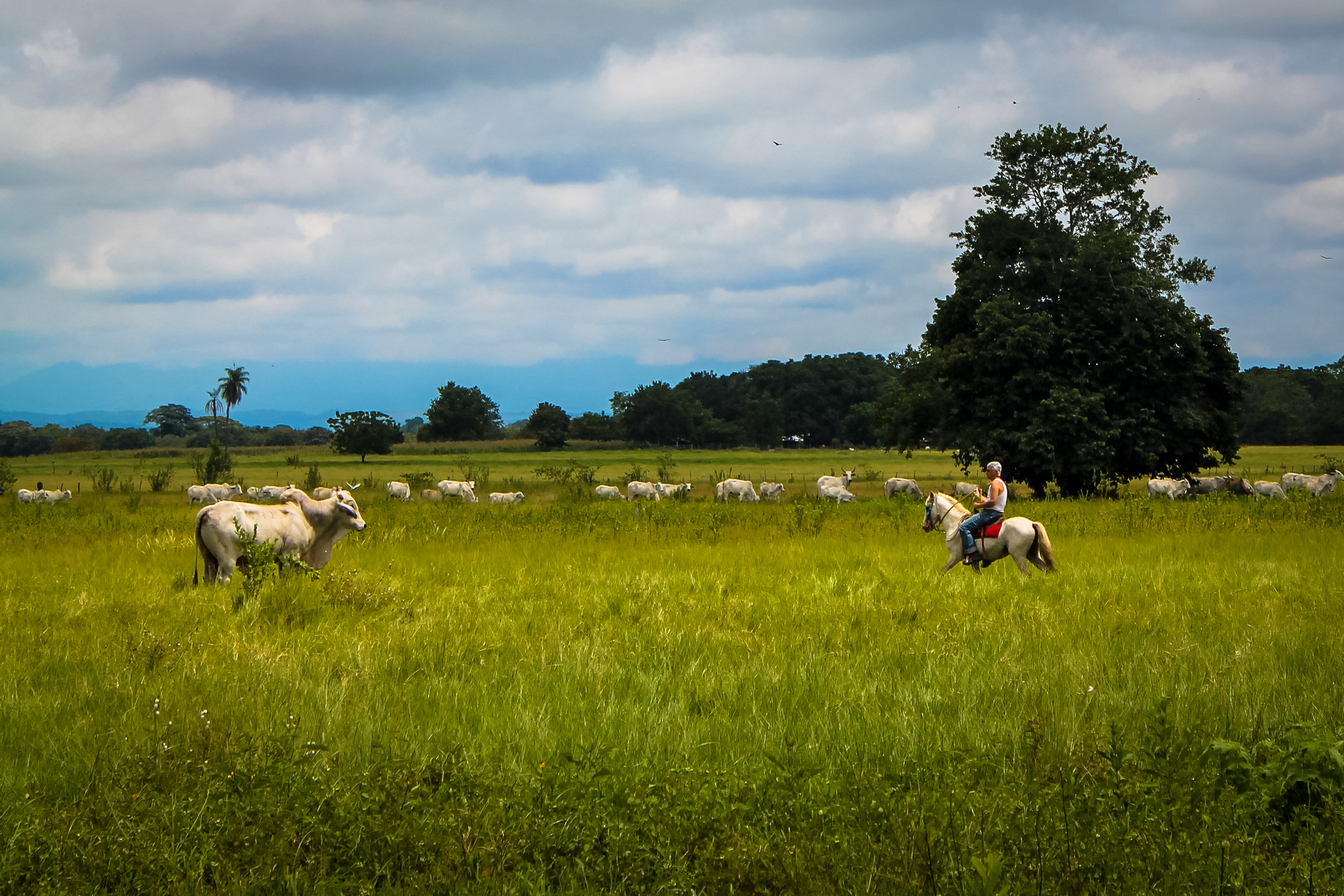
- Cattle in Guanare

- Flag Coat of arms
- Motto: Honor y Gloria (English: Honor and Glory)
- Anthem: Himno del Estado Portuguesa
- Location within Venezuela
- Coordinates: 9.11°N 69.28°W
- Country: Venezuela
- Created: 1909
- Capital: Guanare
- Largest city: Acarigua

Government
  - Body: Legislative Council
  - Governor: Primitivo Cedeño

Area
  - Total: 15,200 km^{2} (5,900 sq mi)
  - Rank: 12th

Population (2011)
  - Total: 876,496
  - Rank: 12th
- Time zone: UTC−4 (VET)
- ISO 3166 code: VE-P
- Emblematic tree: Caoba (Swietenia macrophylla)
- HDI (2019): 0.657 medium · 22nd of 24
- Website: portuguesa.gob.ve

Portuguesa State (Spanish: Estado Portuguesa, IPA: [esˈtaðo poɾtuˈɣesa]) is one of the 23 states of Venezuela. Located in the west of the Republic, it is often considered the "breadbasket of Venezuela" for the large amount of agricultural products produced there. The state is bordered by the state of Lara to the north, to the east by Cojedes, to the west by Trujillo and to the south by Barinas.

As of the 2011 census, it had a population of 876,496. The state capital is the city of Guanare.

== Origin of the name ==
The state was designated Portuguesa on August 4, 1909, named after the Portuguesa River. The name of the river is in turn said to be derived from a local legend about a young woman of Portuguese descent who drowned in the Portuguesa River, possibly accompanying the conquistadors who founded the city of Guanare, the capital of the state.

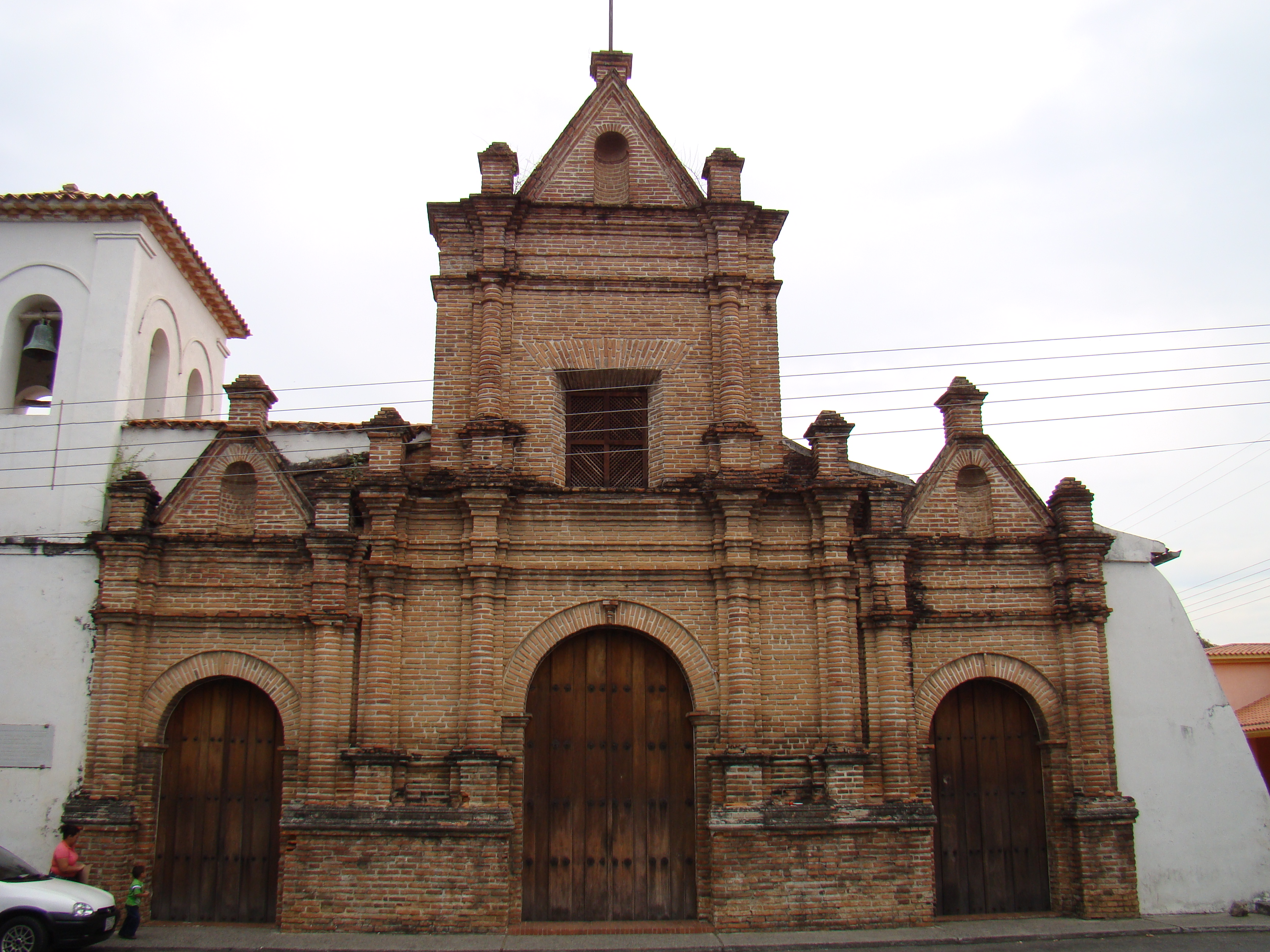
Nuestra Señora del Pilar Church built in the 18th century

== History ==
=== Pre-Columbian era ===
In the pre-Hispanic era, the territory of the Venezuelan plains was inhabited by groups that arrived from the Amazon region by river (probably Colombia or Ecuador).

The oldest known human presence dates to between 300 and 600 BC in Barinas and the Portuguesa plains, with the migrants perhaps attracted by the region's relatively predictable flooding cycle.

Over the next 1200 years, these communities moved northwards and were also influenced by groups from the Orinoco. Among the traces left by these pre-Columbian inhabitants are numerous petroglyphs of geometric, anthropomorphic and zoomorphic figures, as well as a complex network of roads believed to have served to drain swamps or control water. They also left a system of mounds that possibly had functions of surveillance, funerary or refuge for the periods of greatest flooding.

=== Spanish colonization ===
Several expeditions of the Welser Family, originating in Coro under the command of Nikolaus Federmann and Georg von Spira, in the year 1534 and arriving in the Andean foothills crossed the current territory of the Llanos.

In 1542, the armies of Philipp von Hutten from Coro visited the region on their way to Barinas, but were repulsed by the Omaguas Indians and Hutten was wounded.

The Spanish conquerors Diego Ruiz de Vallejo and Juan Ruiz de Villegas explored the lands to the east of the Andes in 1549. Decades later, on November 3, 1591, Juan Fernandez de Leon founded Espiritu Santo of the Guanaguanare Valley, today's Guanare. Its name in the indigenous language means 'Place of seagulls' or 'Land between rivers'.

=== 19th century ===
The Battle of Araure, in which Simon Bolivar defeated Jose Ceballos, occurred in Portuguesa in 1813. At the time, Venezuela was under the control of the patriots in mid-1813, except for the provinces of Guayana and Maracaibo. In September 1813, the royalists received reinforcements from Cadiz, taking the offensive across the country, although the patriots' successes continued until the end of 1813.

On December 3, 1813, Simón Bolívar learned that the Royalist forces (3,500 men), under the command of Brigadier José Ceballos, had met with those of José Yáñez in the town of Araure, and as a result, he arranged for all able bodied men in El Altar and Cojedes to muster in the town of Agua Blanca.

On the 4th, the Patriots marched towards Araure and camped about 1,000 m from the village, opposite the Royalists, who had deployed at the entrance of the Acarigua River with their wings supported by a forest and a small lagoon and their back protected by a forest. The Royalists possessed ten artillery pieces.

The battle began at dawn and lasted approximately six hours. The Royalist troops were numerically superior to the Patriot troops. The Patriots captured 200 prisoners, four flags, and numerous artillery pieces. In this single clash, the Royalists lost more than 500 cavalry.

On April 10, 1851, by decree of the Congress of the Republic under the mandate of General José Gregorio Monagas, the territory that currently makes up the state of Portuguesa became a province, with Guanare as its capital.

=== Federal War ===
The federal war was even more devastating than the emancipatory war in the states of Portuguesa, Apure and Barinas, and especially in Portuguesa, as in addition to the outrages and loss of life in the fighting, the departures of uncontrolled guerrillas, the passions and quarrels produced more deaths and misfortunes than the combats; furthermore, the arson attacks on houses, farms and cattle yards plunged many families of the time into ruin.

In the days of this uncontrolled movement and in the vicinity of Araure, specifically in Tapa de Piedra, on April 4, 1859, a bloody combat was staged between the revolutionary forces of General Zamora and those of the conservative Manuel Herrera. After almost three hours of confrontation, Herrera lost the fight and had to flee with the survivors on the way to Ospino. Following the Federal Revolution in 1866, it was decided to unite the Zamora and Portuguesa entities into one and call it Zamora State. Later, with Antonio Guzmán Blanco in power, the territorial division was reduced to seven states, so Portuguesa became part of the South West state, along with Cojedes and Zamora.

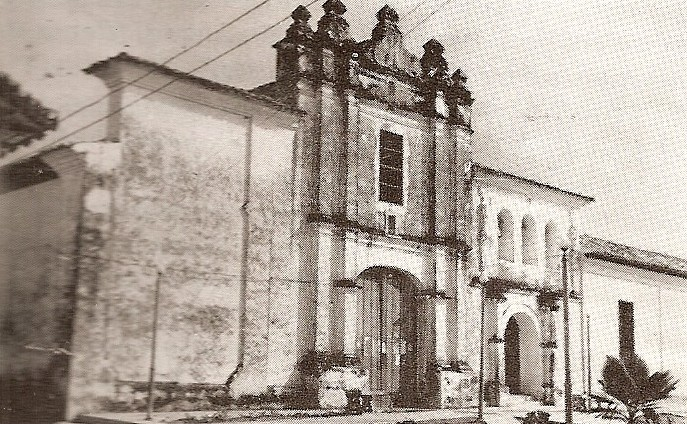
San Francisco Convent in 1920

=== 20th century ===
At the end of the 19th century, the Restoration Revolution brought back the country's political division into 20 states and, consequently, Portuguesa and Cojedes became Zamora again. Finally, on August 5, 1909, the National Constitution was promulgated, which established that Venezuela would be composed of a Federal District, two Federal Territories and 20 states, one of which would be Portuguesa with the capital in the city of Guanare.

Like most of the Llanos states, Portuguesa was practically isolated from the center of the country until the middle of the 20th century. The only way to move from this entity to another was by means of carts pulled by horses or oxen, or by using the waterways. After the overthrow of General Isaías Medina Angarita, the Revolutionary Government Board began to materialize the existing projects designed by the previous rulers on sustainable agricultural development based on the colonization of large areas. It was in the 1940s, when work began on the Los Llanos road, which meant the economic take-off of the region. The foundation of the Turén Agricultural Colony through the work of 20,000 immigrant refugees, mostly Italian, drove the rice plan, and the incorporation of hundreds of hectares of irrigated land were key to the development and growth of this state known as the granary of Venezuela.

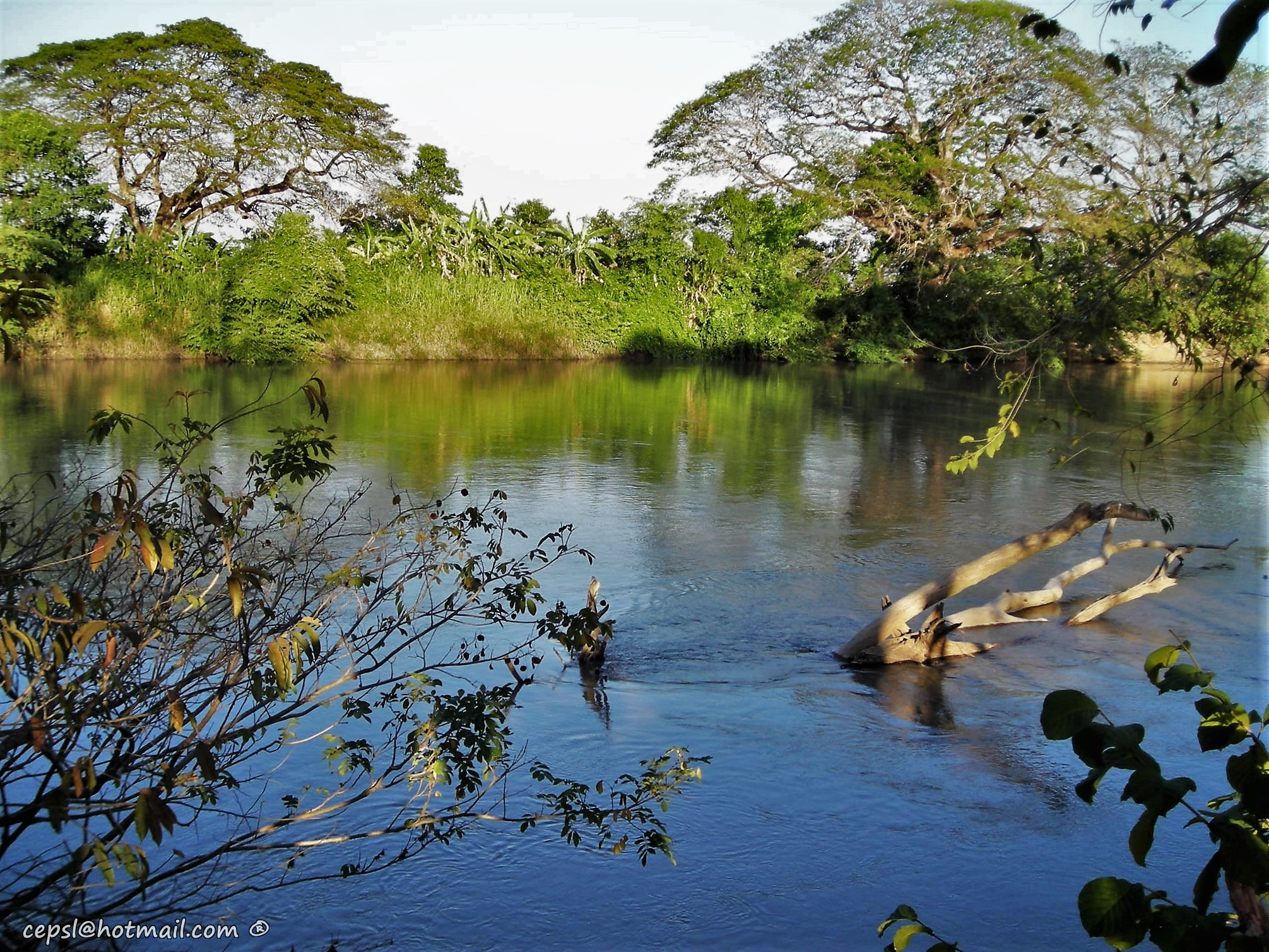
Guanare River

Within this reality, a developmentalist model was adopted with evident influence from the United States. This model made possible the establishment of social relations of production in the agricultural sector based on capitalism. In this vein, at the end of the 1940s and beginning of the 1950s, a "State Project" was initiated called the Turen Agricultural Unit (U.A.T.), which was successively implemented in the Turen Agricultural Colony. To this end, the government, through itinerant diplomacy, made use of the international agreements signed during the post-war period on aid to refugees and put into practice the open border policy of selective immigration promoted by General Marcos Pérez Jiménez, where Europeans (mostly Italians, Spaniards and Germans) with an agricultural tradition entered and shared work with Venezuelan citizens from various regions of the Republic. In 1949, the Agricultural Unit or Colony of Turen, the most ambitious experience of its kind ever carried out in a Caribbean country, was initiated. Located, as well as the Tovar colony, in an area of mountains, the future Granary of Venezuela sheltered, together with a minority of local farmers, a babel of immigrants from several countries. Initially, they were mainly Eastern Europeans, who arrived through the "International Refugee Organization", many of them ethnic Germans from Romania, but already in the beginning of the 50's the Italians and Germans became the relative majority of the immigrant population.

== Geography ==
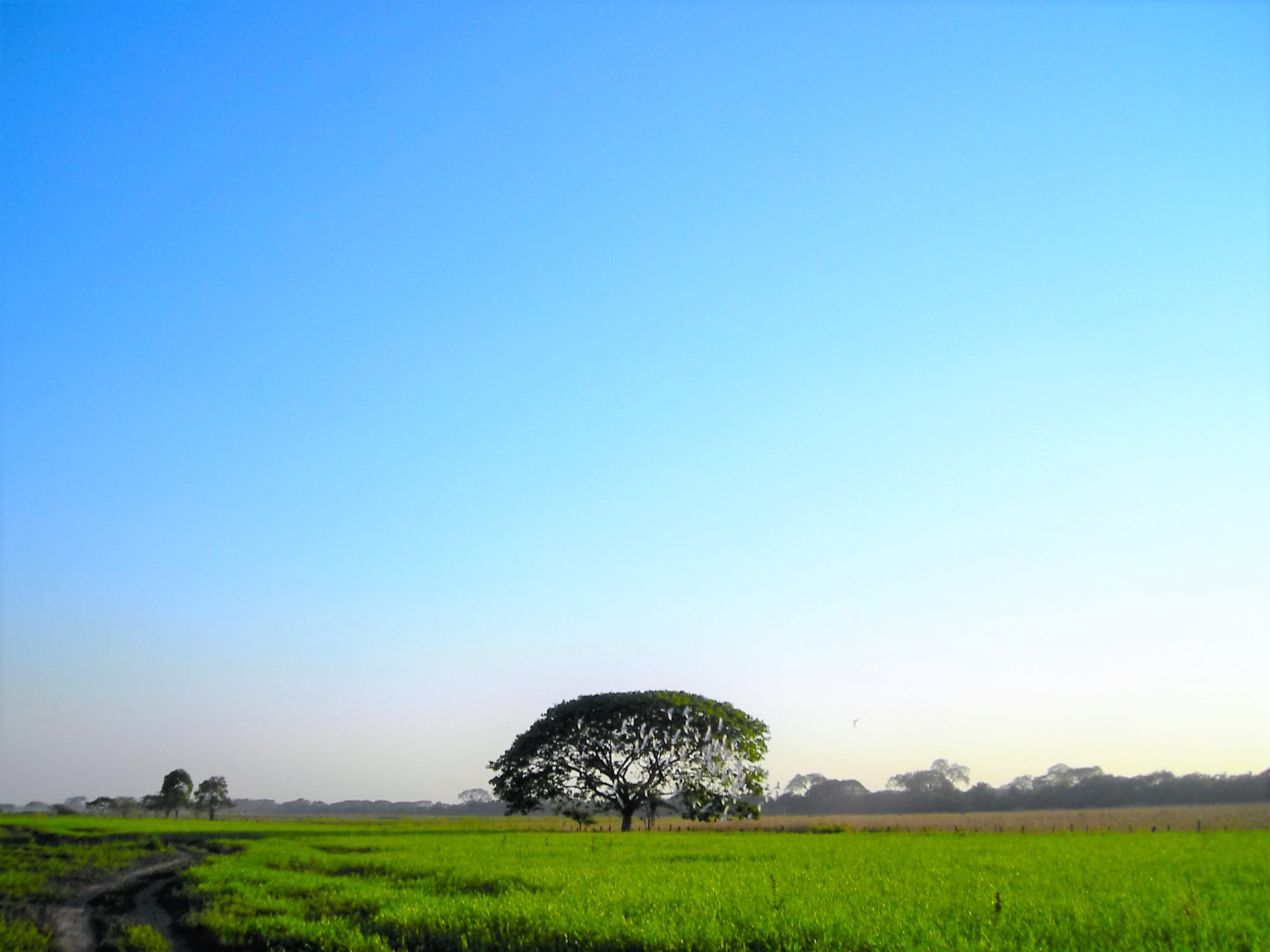
Landscape of the Plains of Portuguesa

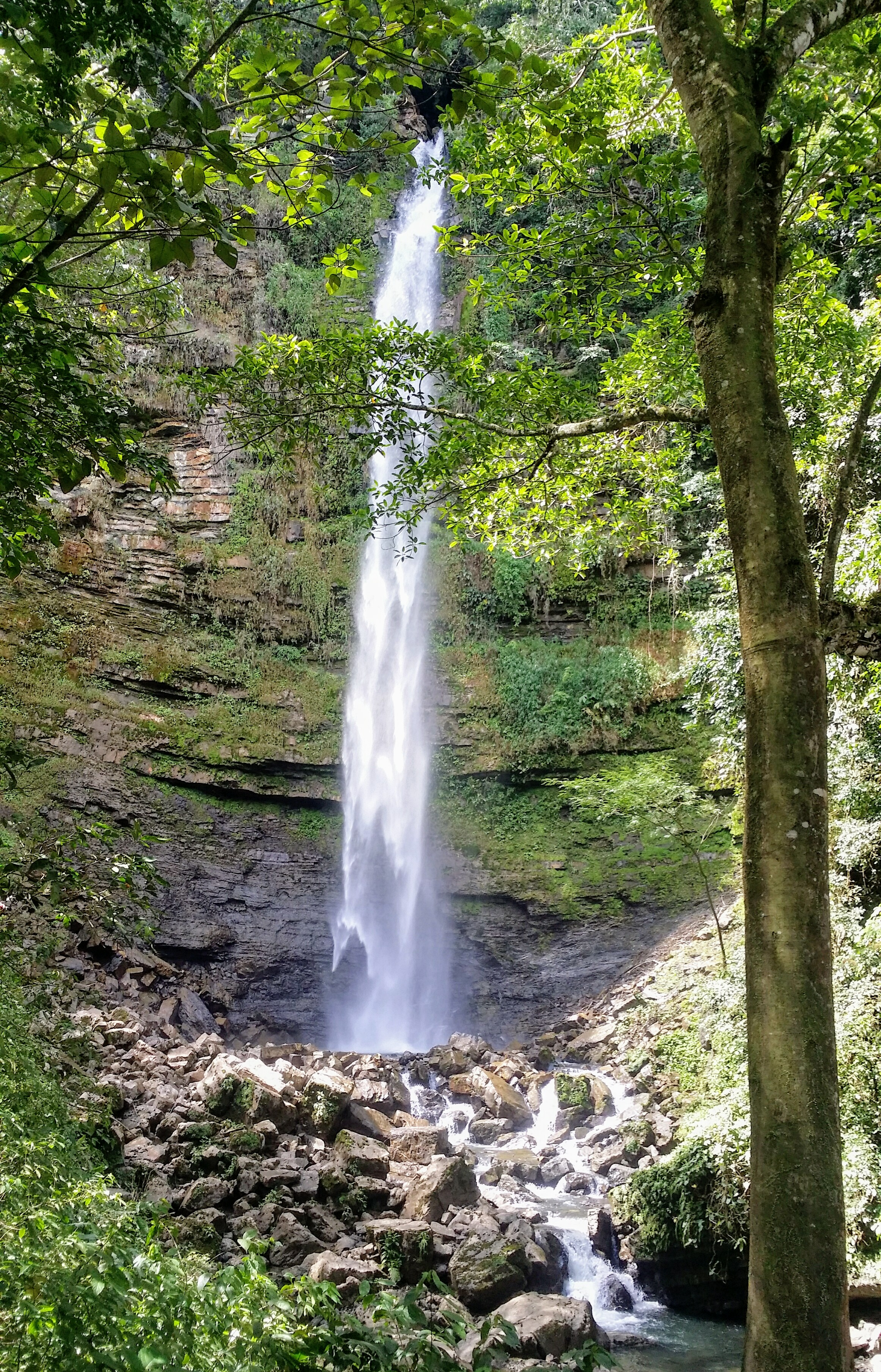
Chorro de Ospino, Portuguesa state

It is located in the Midwestern Region of the country, extending approximately between latitudes 08°06′ and 09°50′ north latitude, and meridians 68°30′ and 70°11′ west longitude. It has an area of 15,200 km^{2} (5,900 sq mi) representing 1.67% of the national territory. Most of its territory is flat and corresponds to the Western Plains. To the northwest it has mountains and hills of the Andes Mountains. The Andean mountainous area to the West and Northwest, with heights above 3,000 m, where the valleys of Chabasquén and Biscucuy open, in whose hills coffee and smaller fruits are grown. With 1,024,300 inhabitants for 2017 it occupies the 12th place among the most populous federal entities in Venezuela. The Portuguesa state is divided into 14 municipalities and 28 parishes.

=== Hydrography ===
Some water courses include: Portuguese Red, Caño Guamal, and Caño Amarillo, which corresponds to the old riverbed of the Acarigua River that is fed by the above-mentioned channel during the summer season; in addition to Caño Turen, Caño El Toro, Caño Durigua, Caño Colorado, Caño Canaguapa, Caño Maratán, Quebrada Paso Real, Quebrada Cupra, Quebrada Cambural, and Quebrada de Araure.

The Acarigua River passes through the west of the Acarigua municipality and serves as a border with the Esteller Municipality.

=== Climate ===
It has a relatively homogeneous climate, where the average minimum temperature varies between 20º and 35 °C, being this one regulated by the winds coming from the gulf of Venezuela and the trade winds that go up the Llanos, which produce areas of cloudiness and frequent torrential rains. A typical Sabana climate of the plain area of Venezuela where Guanare is located. It has two well-defined periods, a dry period from December to April, and a rainy period from May to November.

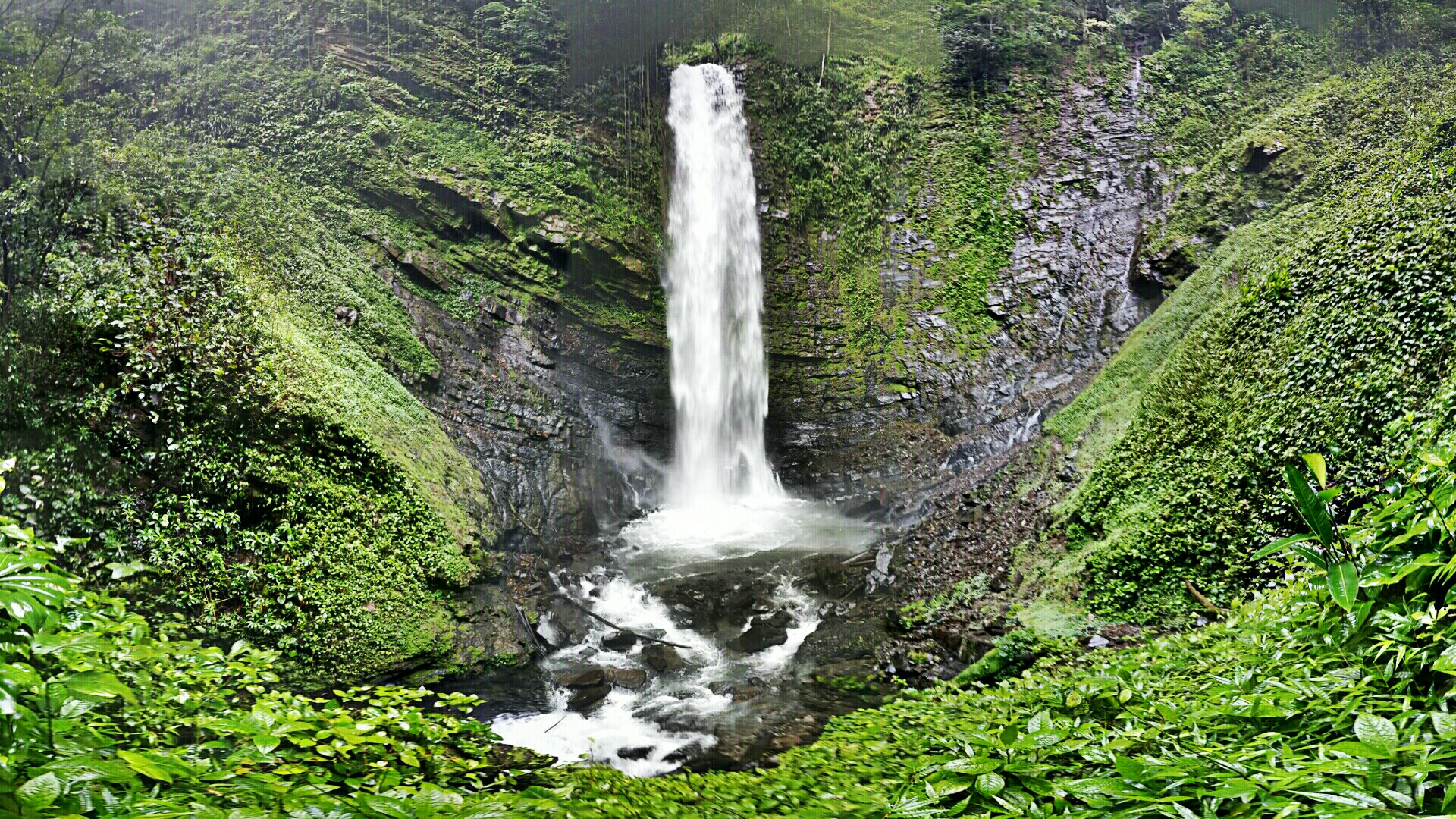
Chorro San Juan de la Montaña

During the beginning of the drought (December, January and February) it is characterized by the scarcity of rain, and a great thermal amplitude, where the nights are usually cool, early mornings with up to 19 °C, and during the day very hot (max 29-31 °C). This is also the windiest time of the year. Around March and the beginning of April, the daily temperature range decreases a little, bringing with it the hottest season in the village. The lowest temperature recorded is 17 °C on 5 April 1984 and the highest is 41 °C during several occasions and heat waves occurring with the El Niño phenomenon.

The average annual temperature (Max-Min) is between 22 °C and 26 °C, in the area of flat lands and in the area of mountain and piedmont landscapes the climatic conditions vary according to height variations. Precipitation is persistent throughout the year, causing rivers to maintain an abundant flow, even overflow and therefore flooding.

=== Flora and fauna ===
The dominant vegetation is savanna, but are also gallery forests along the river bends, and dense forests in the foothills of the Andes. There are abundant hardwoods which are a major income source, represented by the dwarf oak, mahogany, eucalyptus, teak and pine. The fauna is represented by: spectacled bears, jaguars, (both endangered species), armadillos, parrots, opossums, howler monkeys, deer, ocelots, pumas and southern tamandua. There are birds like the crested curassow, hummingbird, great kiskadee and cardinal. One of the largest species of moth in the world can be found: the Thysania agrippina, with wingspan of 30.5 cm.

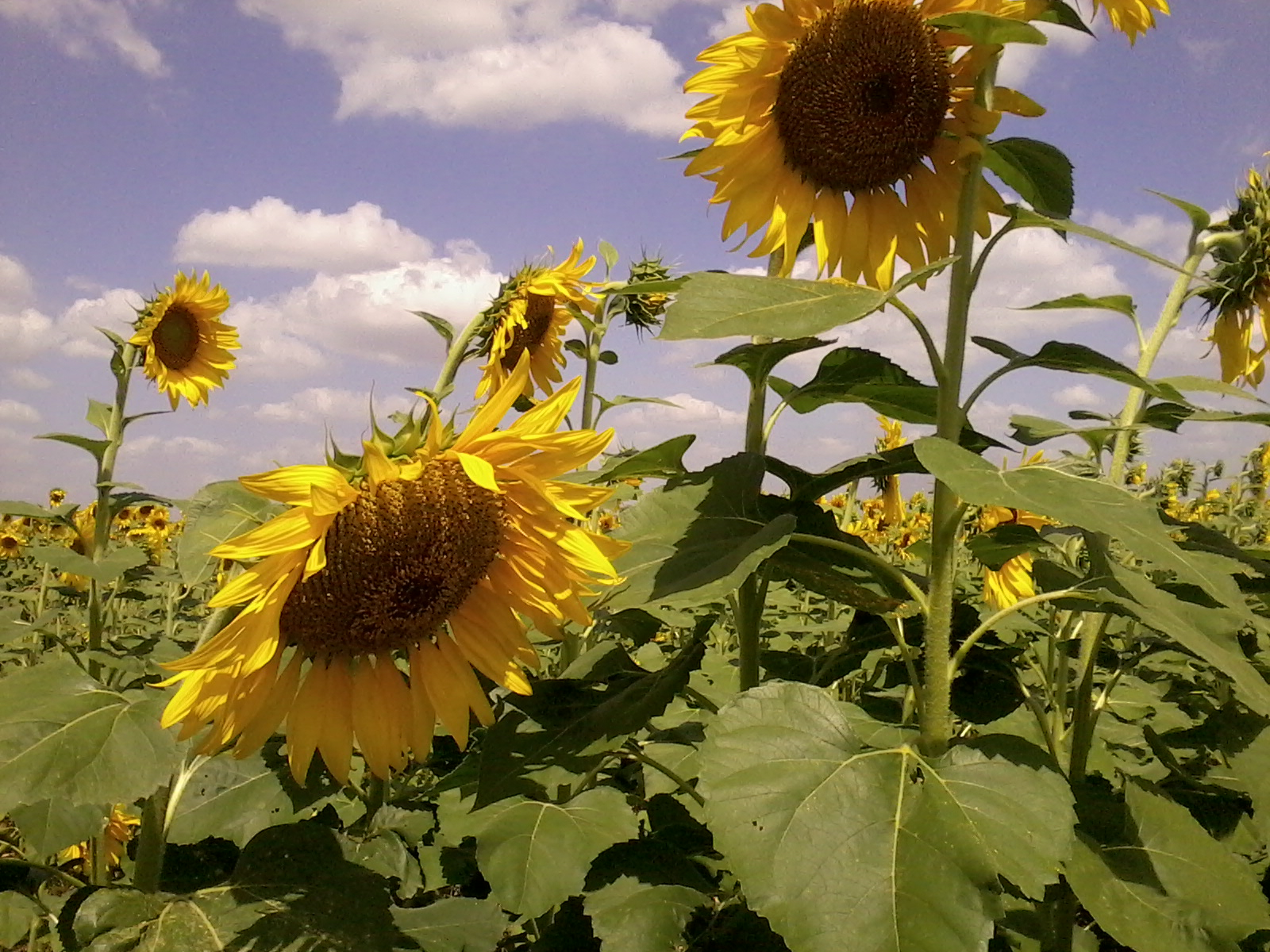
Girasoles en el Municipio Turen

In some places of the state, wildlife can be distributed as follows:

- Mammals: rabipelado (common opossum, Didelphis marsupialis); wooly weasel (bare-tailed woolly opossum, Caluromys philander); common marmosa (Robinson's mouse opossum, Marmosa robinsoni); babanero rabbit (eastern cottontail, Sylvilagus floridanus); and agoutis or mountain acures (Brazilian guinea pig, Cavia aperea)
- Birds: ponchas or soisolas (red-legged tinamou, Crypturellus erythropus); whistling ducks (Dendrocygna spp.); diving duck (lesser scaup, Aythya affinis); paují culo blanco (black curassow, Crax alector); and common parrot (Amazonia spp.)
- Reptiles: galápago llanero (savanna side-necked turtle, Podocnemis vogli); terecay (yellow-spotted river turtle, Podocnemis unifilis); and iguana (Iguana iguana)
- Crustaceans: elf shrimp (Dendrocephalus geayi); crab (Dilocarcinus dentatus); and shrimp (Macrobrachium amazonicum, Macrobrachium jelskii, Macrobrachium reyesi, Palaemonetes mercedae).
- Molluscs: river clams (Anodontites gunarensis and Mycetopoda pittieri); aquatic snails (Aplexa rivalis and Thiara granifera); pomaceas, corobas and guaruras (snails, Pomacea aurostoma, Pomacea crassa, Pomacea dolioides, Pomacea falconensis, Pomacea interrupta, Pomacea glauca, Pomacea glauca, Pomacea glauca, Pomacea interrupta, Pomacea glauca, Pomacea glauca, Pomacea interrupta, Pomacea glauca, Pomacea interrupta)

== Politics and government ==
The Portuguese State, as an autonomous federal entity with constitutional rank, has the five branches of Public Power: Executive (Government), Legislative (Legislative Council of the Portuguese State), Judicial (Judicial District of the Portuguese State), Electoral and Citizen. Its authorities are elected by the people in a universal, direct and secret way. It is represented by 6 main deputies in the National Assembly. Like the other 23 federal entities of Venezuela, the State maintains its own police force, which is supported and complemented by the National Police and the Venezuelan National Guard.

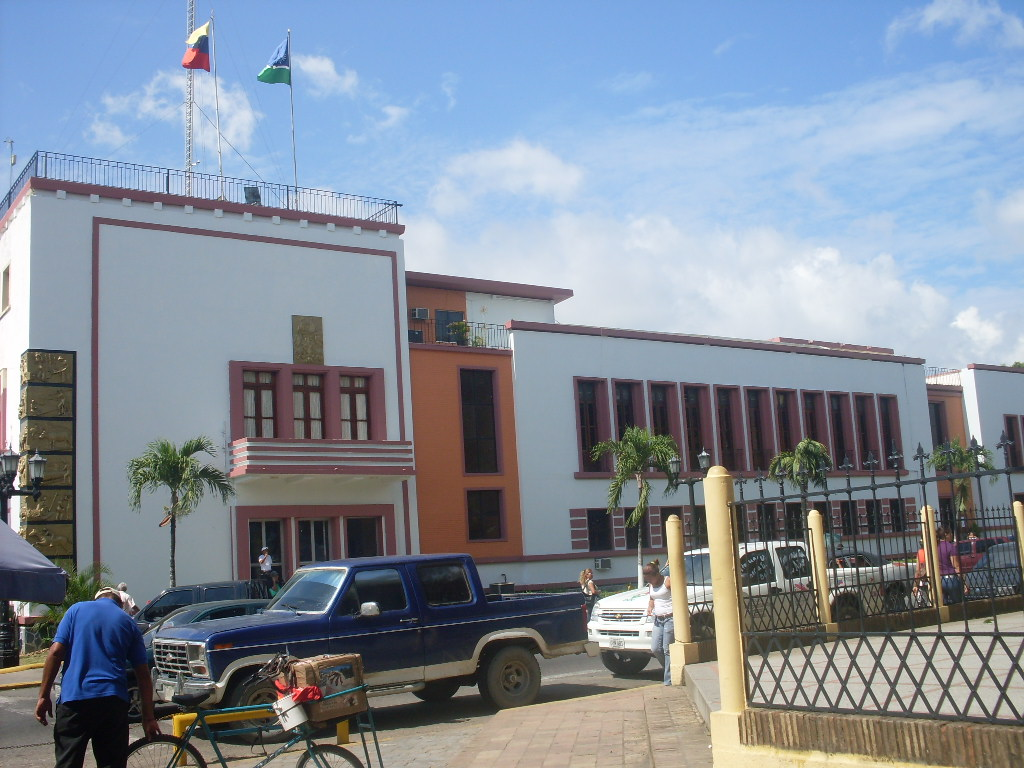
Headquarters of the Government of the Portuguesa State, in Guanare, Venezuela

=== Executive Power ===
It is exercised by the Governor of the Portuguese State, the Secretary General of the Government and the Secretaries of State who fulfil the powers determined by the Constitution of the State and the Republic.

Since 1989, governors have been selected in direct elections by the population. The first governor to be elected under direct elections was Elias D'Onghia, of the AD party, and he won with 38.40% of the votes. The current governor is Rafael Calles, of the PSUV party, who won the elections for the period 2017- 2021.

=== Legislature ===
It is exercised by the Legislative Council of the Portuguese State, a unicameral regional parliament elected every four years, which, according to the State Constitution, has 11 legislators who sanction the laws that have state rank and whose members are elected in a universal, direct and secret manner.

== Municipalities ==
Portuguesa State is divided in 14 municipalities (municipios) and 28 Parroquias:

Municipality	Capital	Population (2010)	Area (km^{2})
Agua Blanca	Agua Blanca	21,506	199
Araure	Araure	157,611	640
Esteller	Píritu	60,619	754
Guanare	Guanare	223,596	2008
Guanarito	Guanarito	48,841	3103
José Vicente de Unda	Paraíso de Chabasquén	28,892	222
Ospino	Ospino	60,026	1675
Páez	Acarigua	224,919	425
Papelón	Papelón	23,060	2203
San Genaro de Boconoíto	Boconoíto	23,312	1031
San Rafael de Onoto	San Rafael de Onoto	20,507	187
Santa Rosalía	El Playón	33,510	1029
Sucre	Biscucuy	52,149	400
Turén	Villa Bruzual	75,016	1324

== Demographics ==
Historical population
Year	Pop.	±% p.a.
1873	79,934	—
1881	95,814	+2.29%
1891	96,045	+0.02%
1920	52,549	−2.06%
1926	58,721	+1.87%
1936	71,675	+2.01%
1941	87,151	+3.99%
1950	122,153	+3.82%
1961	203,707	+4.76%
1971	297,047	+3.84%
1981	424,984	+3.65%
1990	576,435	+3.44%
2001	725,740	+2.12%
2011	876,496	+1.91%
Source: "XIV CENSO NACIONAL DE POBLACIÓN Y VIVIENDA - Resultados por Entidad Federal y Municipio del Estado Portuguesa" (PDF). Instituto Nacional de Estadística.

By 2001 the state had a population of 873,375 inhabitants, representing 3.34% of the national total. It has a growth rate of 2.1% per year, and a density of 57.5 inhabitants per km^{2}. According to the estimate for 2012 the state population is 1,056,000 inhabitants, of whom 517,780 were female and 538,243 male. Acarigua city in the north, is the largest conurbation in the state, being the second largest in the center-west of the country, along with Araure form an area with over 460,000 inhabitants (2001 Census). The state capital, Guanare, in recent years has grown at a rapid pace, at present estimated population is over 200,000 just in the town itself. Due to its recent momentum Portuguesa State has become a major recipient of migrants from other regions of the country.

=== Race and ethnicity ===
According to the 2011 Census, the racial composition of the population was:

Racial composition	Population	%
Mestizo	—N/a	58.4
White	348,745	37.0
Black	32,989	3.5
Other race	—N/a	1.1

== Religion ==
Most of the population professes the Christian religion in its Catholic denomination, although other religious minorities such as Protestants, Jews or Muslims can also be found in smaller numbers. Portuguesa is the Center of one of the largest religious centers of the country the Basilica and Sanctuary of Our Lady of Coromoto, patroness of Venezuela. Also highlights in the State the Cathedral of Our Lady of the Bark in Acarigua whose history dates back.

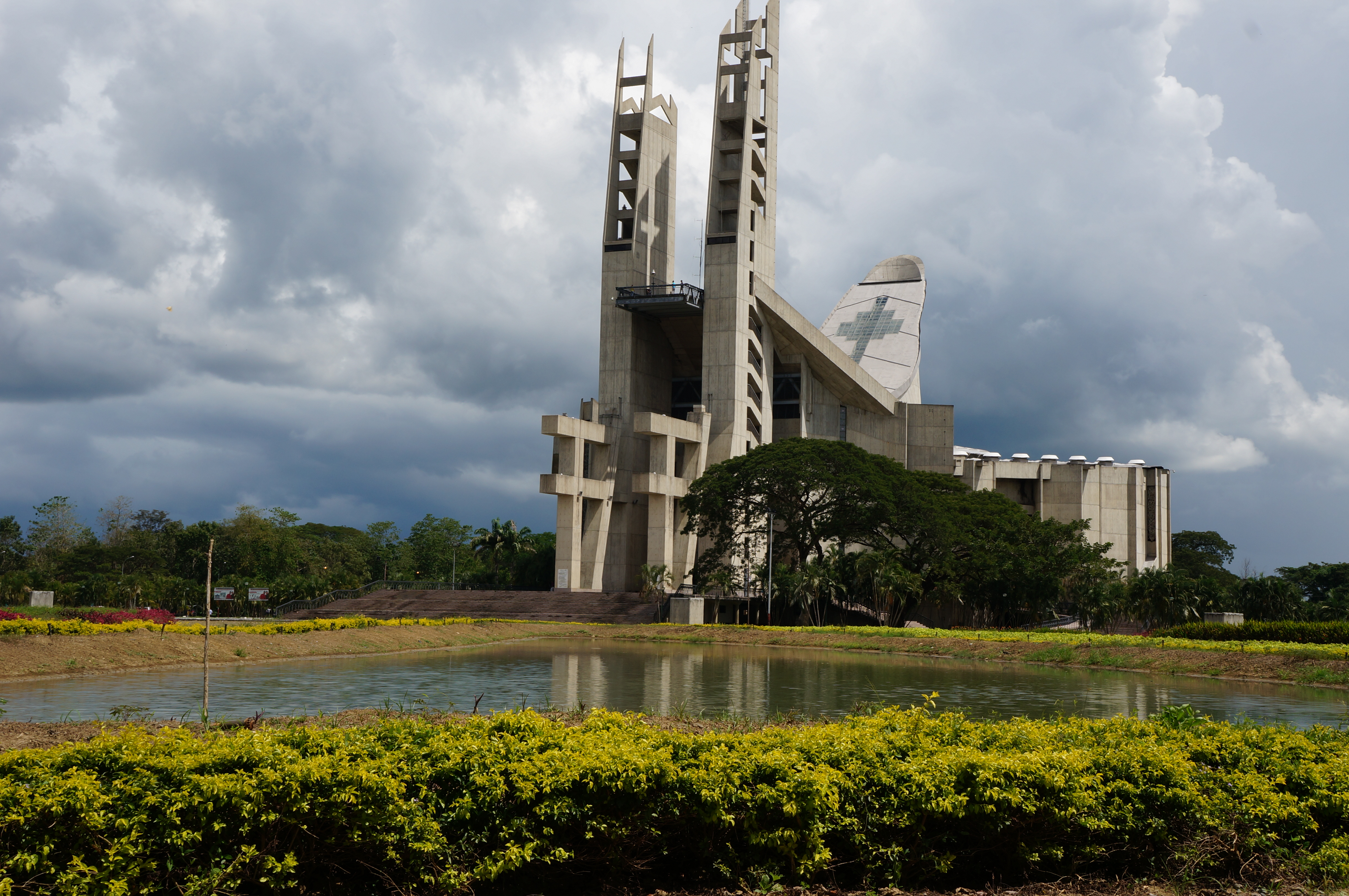
Catholic Shrine of Our Lady of Coromoto, patroness of Venezuela

The National Shrine of Our Lady of Coromoto or more formally Minor Basilica National Shrine of Our Lady of Coromoto is located 25 kilometers from the city of Guanare, Portuguesa, The Sanctuary is built on the place where Catholics believe that the second appearance of the Virgin Mary to the Coromoto Indian occurred.

The construction project was drawn up by the Spanish architect Juan Capdevila Elías and the Venezuelan architect Erasmo Calvani in 1975.The temple was consecrated on January 7, 1996, and inaugurated with a mass by Pope John Paul II on February 10 of the same year.

== Economy ==
The main economic activity in Portuguesa State is agriculture: crop farming as well as livestock. Recently tourism as well as oil exploration are gaining momentum.

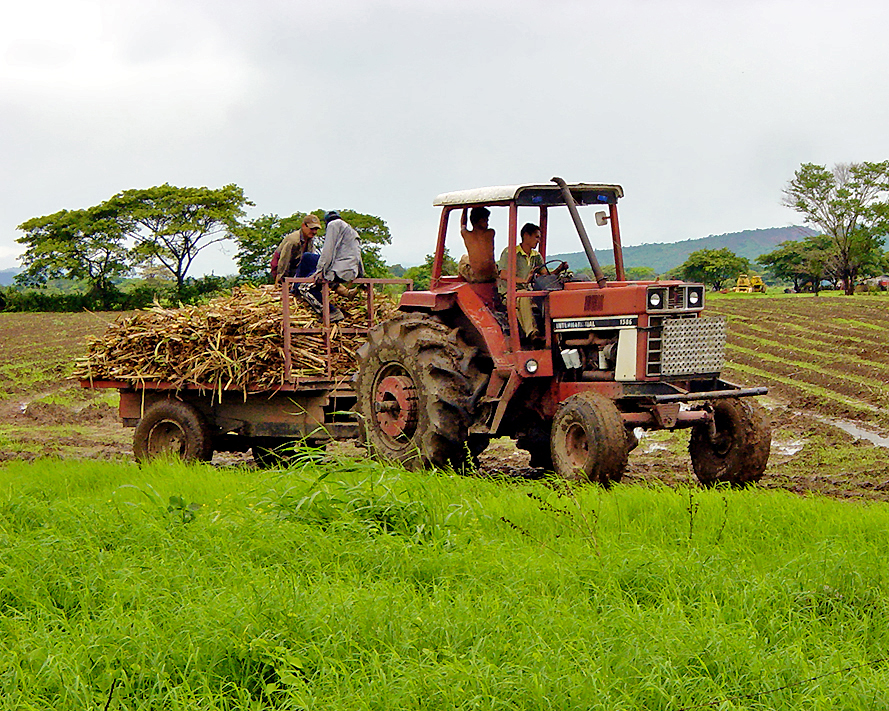
Farm workers in the state of Portuguesa

In the cities of Guanare and Acarigua-Araure industry has grown as a sector, especially sugar, rice and corn processing. This conurbation has for the last 10 years had a huge growth in the housing and commercial sectors, with the construction of large urban projects in the area north of the city, among the largest urban projects include:

- Urb. Bosques de Camoruco
- Urb. Llano Alto
- Villa Antigua
- Plaza Antigua
- Plaza Colonial
- Agua clara
- Parque residencial miraflores

The main commercial projects are:

- Guanare Mall (under construction)
- Llano Mall Shopping City
- Buenaventura Mall

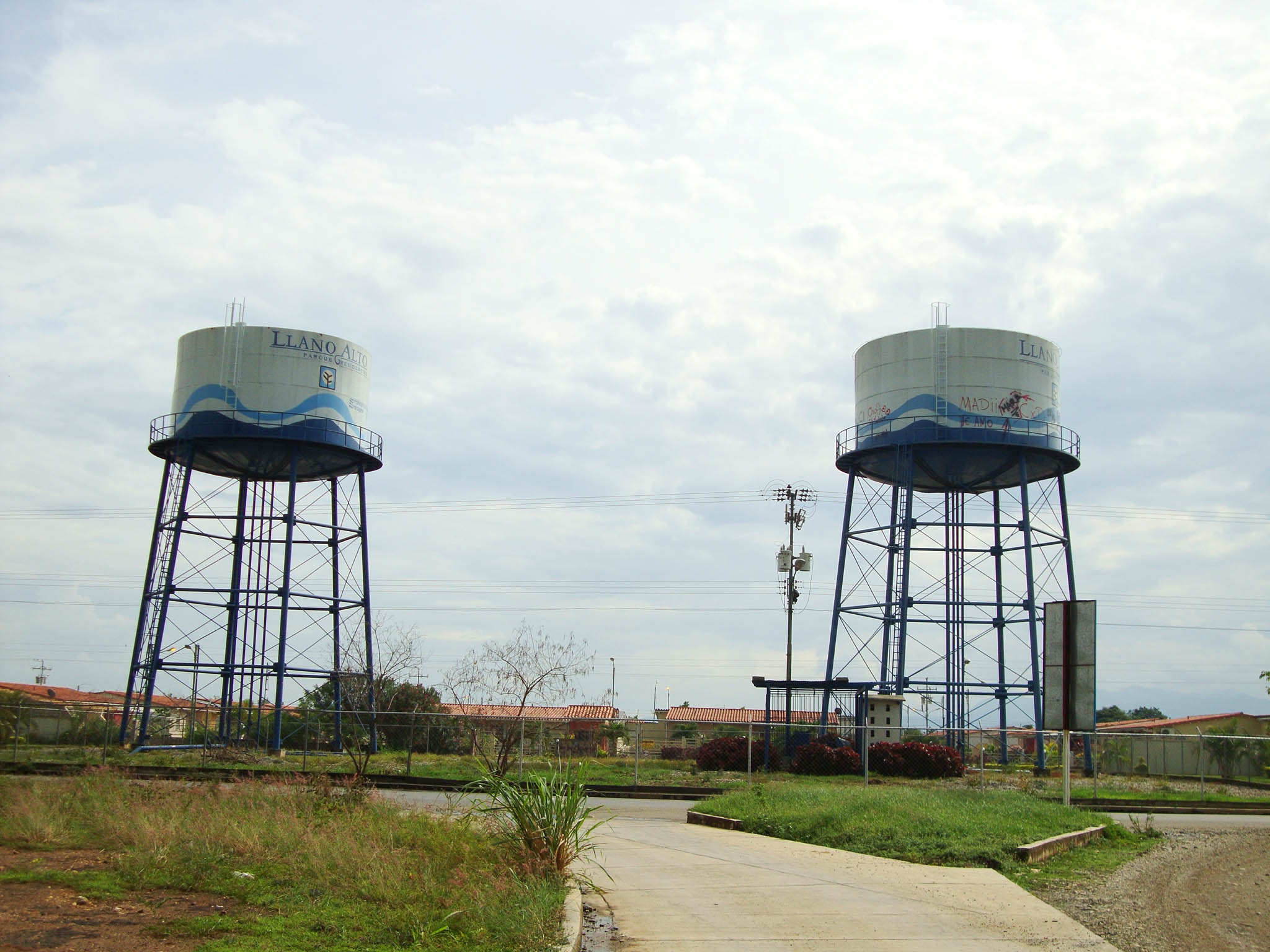
Araure, Portuguesa

== Tourism ==
The Quebrada de Araure spa is one of its main attractions. It is a ravine with clear and clean waters, located on the Araure-Acarigua road, where tourists can enjoy a pleasant time. It also has a recreational park where the whole family can have fun.

Among the historical sites that stand out is El Túmulo, a monument to the Battle of Araure, which is located on the side of the Pan-American Highway. This fight was special because it was one of the only two hand-to-hand battles that Simon Bolivar fought.

The church of Nuestra Señora del Pilar in Zaragoza, located in front of Plaza Bolívar, is another obligatory stop in Araure. Its architecture preserves the colonial style, typical of the 18th century, mixed with the baroque style that gives it great majesty. It is the only colonial church in Venezuela that has a choir independent of the main entrance doors of the temple. José Antonio Páez was baptized there, and it was here that in 1813 the Liberator Simón Bolívar prayed before the triumph of the Battle of Araure. It was declared a National Monument in 1955.

Another outstanding place is the Mittar Nakicenovic Park. He was an environmental engineer of Yugoslavian origin, who arrived in this area in 1949 with the noble task of reforesting vast areas, found until then in a deplorable state. This park was created to protect the hydrographic basin where the Araure Gorge begins.

=== Natural heritage ===
- Chorro de San Miguel

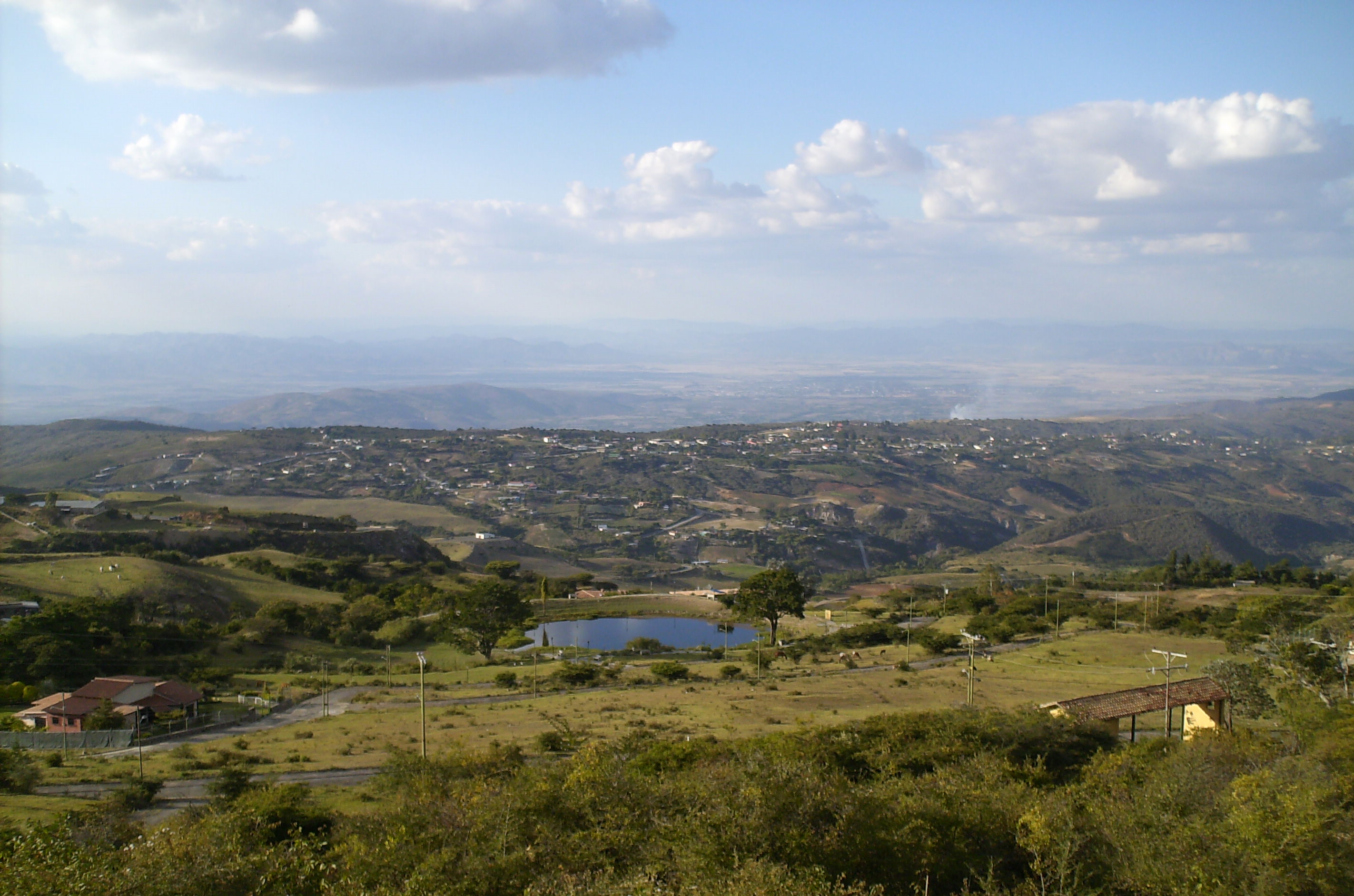
Guanare Landscape, Portuguese State

- Balneário Quebrada de Araure, This is a ravine of clear and clean waters, located on the road Araure-Acarigua, where tourists can enjoy a pleasant time. It also has a recreational park used by many local families.
- Balneario Sagas River, located on the Biscucuy - Chabasquén road
- Balneario Acarigua River Natural, and Fishing Site, (in Winter Time)
- Sabanetica Spa.
- Balneario Estación (Ospino Municipality)
- Balneario Quebrada de Leña
- Balneario El Mamón
- Balneario Los Arroyos
- Balnearies Quebrada de Araure, known as "El Dique".
- Balneario Cupra (Municipality of Paez)
- Balneario Quebrada de Williams Rumbos, known as "La Loba".

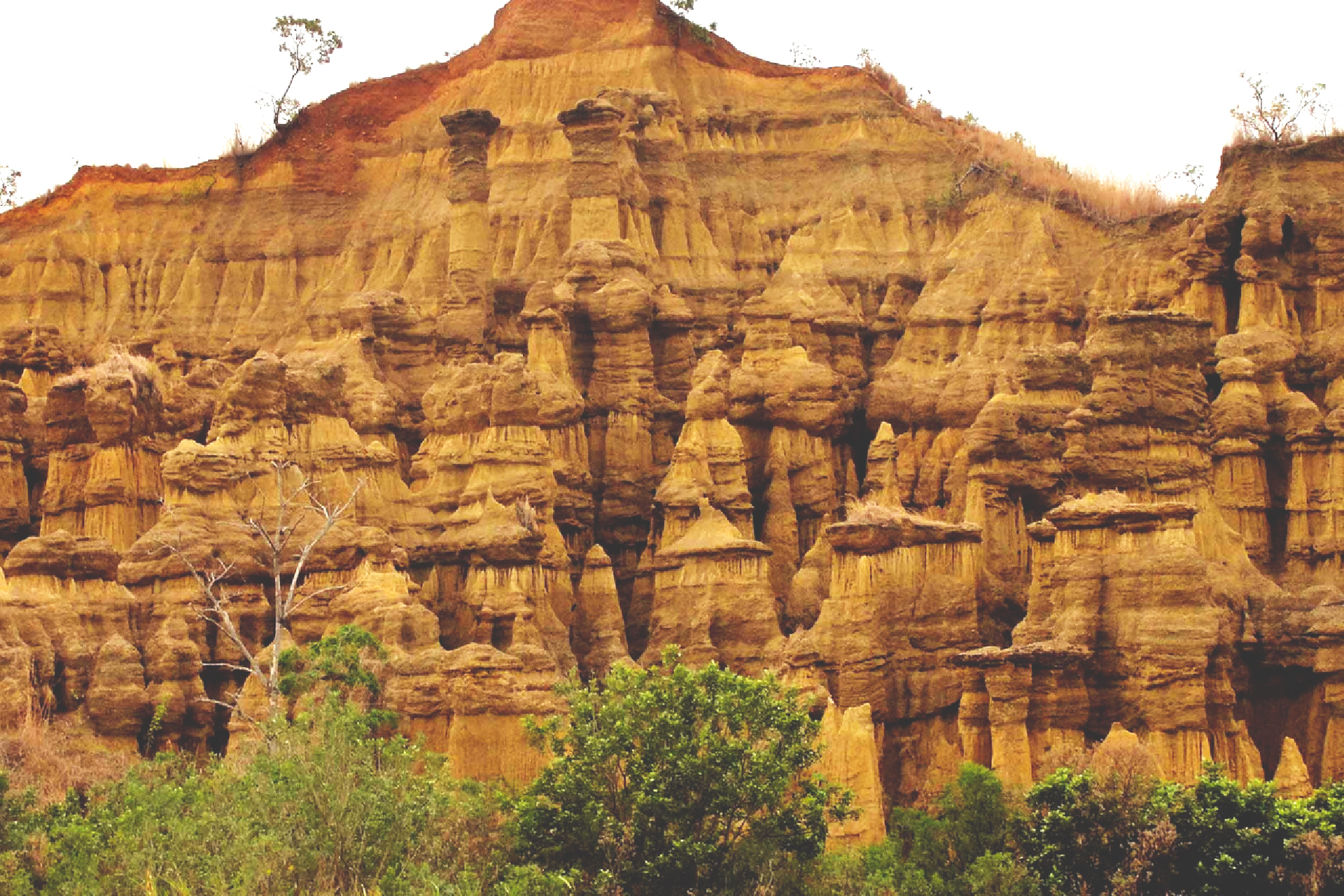
Los frailes, Ospino

=== Parks ===
- Dinira National Park
- Samanes Park, was built in 1983. Tradition has it that under the leafy samans that currently make up the park, the army of the Liberator Simón Bolívar camped out during the Admirable Campaign of 1813.
- José Antonio Páez Park, southwest of Guanare, is this fair complex that has 13.8 developed hectares. The 5% of the land has facilities such as the Exhibition Pavilion, the Convention Center and the Museum of the Plains. It was inaugurated in 1993 and is considered the vegetable lung of the municipality of Guanare.
- Mittar Nakicenovic Park
- Musiu Carmelo Park, located next to the Acarigua Araure Passenger Terminal
- Curpa Park, popularly known as José Antonio Páez Park, a place where there are many leafy trees and a river that borders the east of the city of Acarigua, is also a huge natural lung and a must for all locals.
- Musiu Carmelo Park (future Acarigua Zoo)
- Park "Mano" Nerio Duin Anzola Zoo.
- Raul Leoni Park.
- Acarigua Recreational Park I.
- Las Majaguas Recreational Park
- Algarrobo Park, headquarters of Indera (Municipality of Paez)
- Los Samanes de Guanare Park

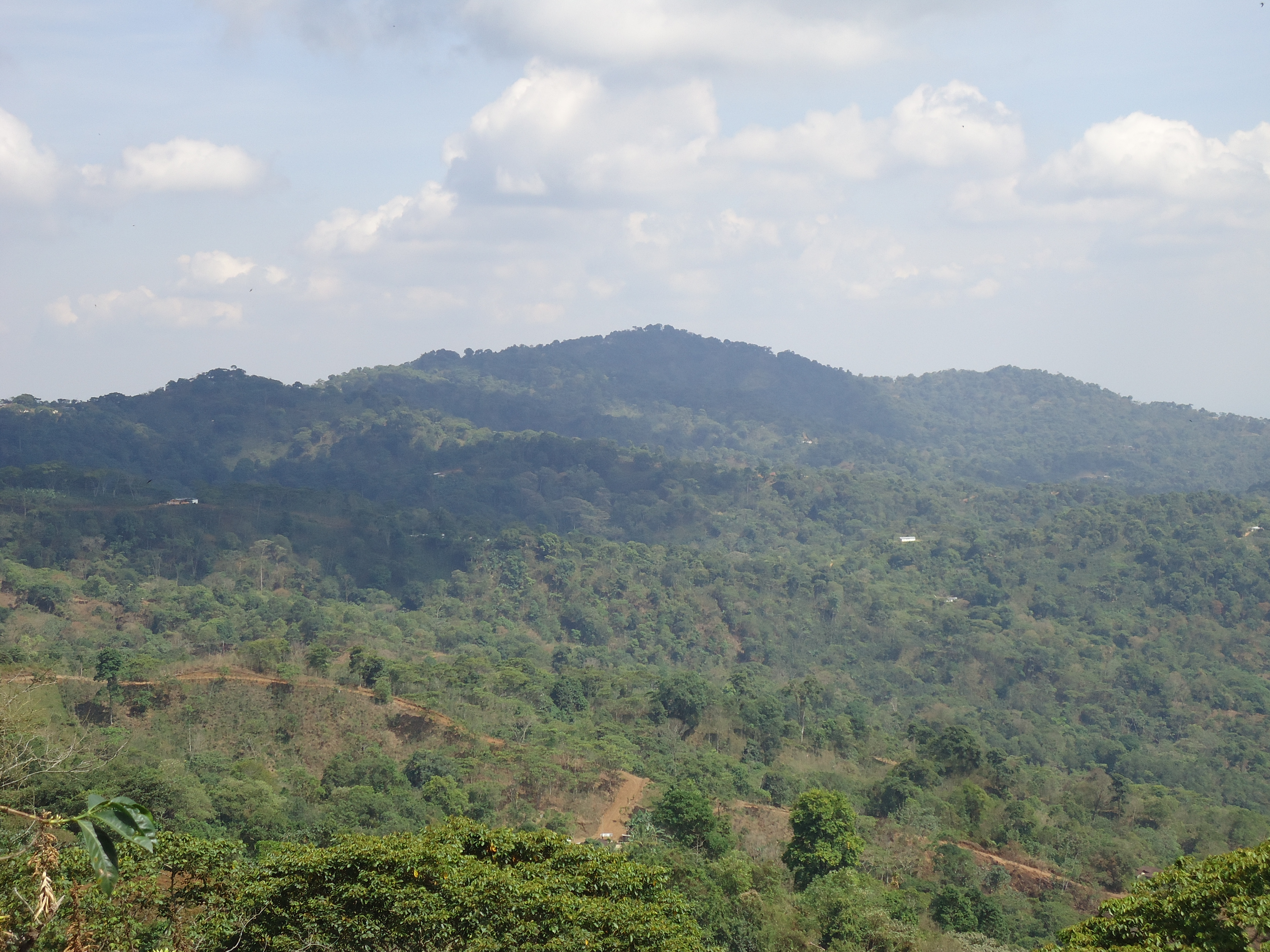
Mountainous landscape in the municipality of Sucre, Portuguesa

=== Built heritage ===
- Sanctuary of Our Lady of Coromoto
- Los Llanos Museum in Guanare
- Our Lady of the Pillar Church
- Our Lady of the Bark Cathedral
- Inés Mercedes Gómez Álvarez de Guanare Museum
- Doll Museum
- Former Guanare prison
- Monument The Tumulus
- José Antonio Páez Museum
- Casa de la Cultura "Guillermo Gamarra Marrero"
- Argimiro Gabaldon Convention Center
- Old San Francisco Convent in Guanare

== Transport ==
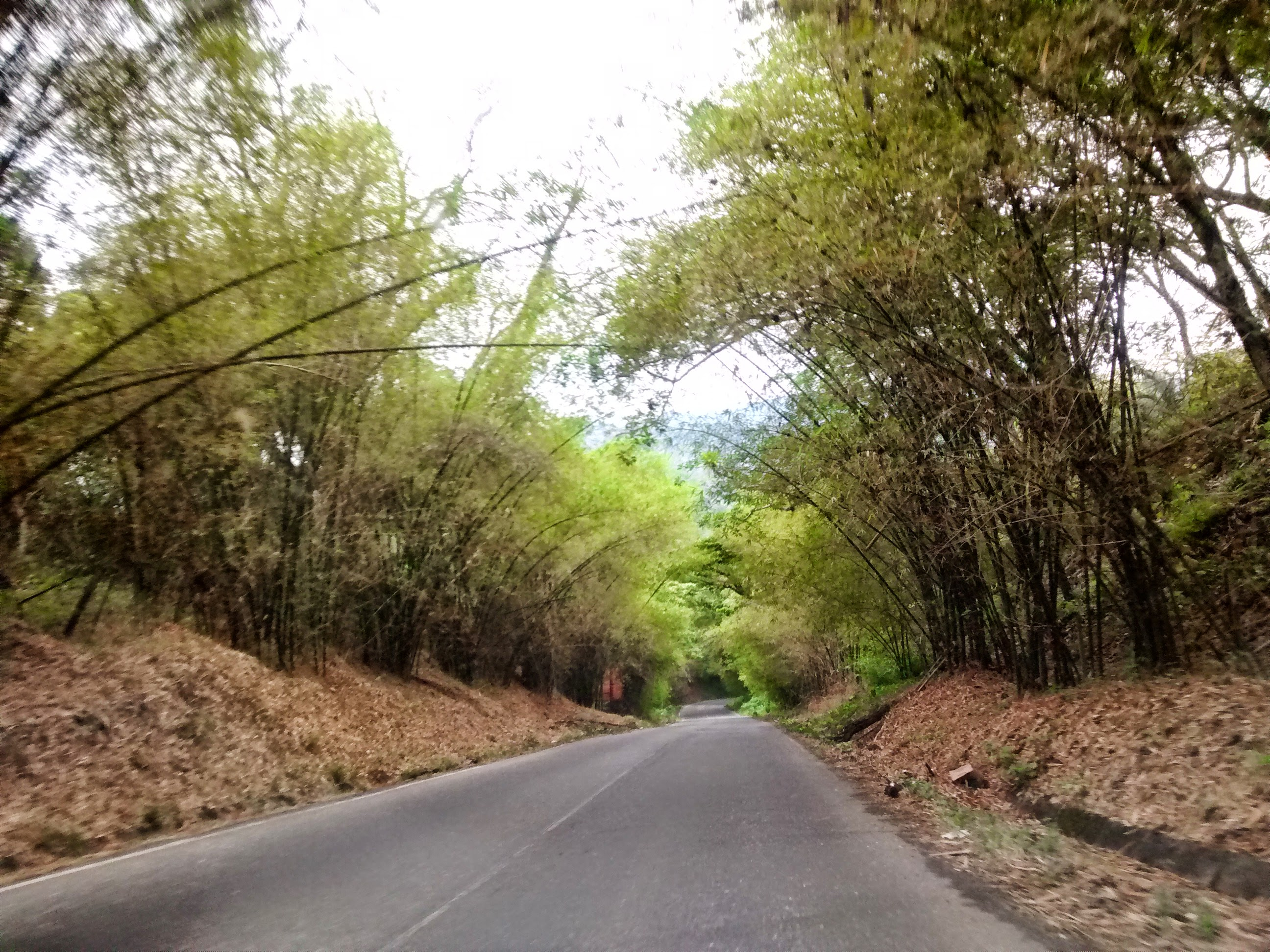
Rural road in the Portuguese State

The state has the Oswaldo Guevara Mujica de Araure Brigadier General Airport, which is located west of the city and maintains private flights, mainly to Caracas, is operated by the Autonomous Institute of Airports of the Portuguese State (IABAEP). It was expanded and reconstructed due to the need to incorporate "Bomberos Aéreos" (air firefighters), where the vertical growth of the airport facilities, the establishment of commercial premises, the improvement of the medical service and navigation services are contemplated; in addition to the maneuvering area (runway). It also has a transport terminal to the north, near the road to San Carlos, which is responsible for covering urban and interurban routes. An important point to highlight is that the Instituto Autónomo de Ferrocarriles within the macro-project "Sistema Ferroviario Nacional" is carrying out the Simón Bolívar Section that contemplates the connection of Puerto Cabello with Acarigua, which by rehabilitating existing structures, seeks to satisfy the demand for transportation in an efficient manner and significantly improve communication between the population centers that are positively impacted.

== Sports ==
In Acarigua the Julio Hernández Molina Bachiller Stadium (baseball) with capacity for 12,000 fans; The Portuguese Soccer Club first division team operates, whose headquarters is the José Antonio Paéz Stadium, with a capacity for 18,000 spectators. In the municipality of San Genaro de Boconoíto el Bocaito FC is now extinct and in the city of Turén, Atlético Turén and Turén International, which plays in the lower divisions of Venezuelan football.

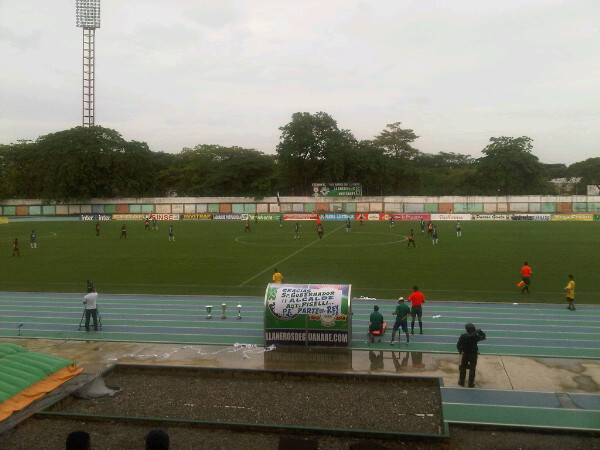
Rafael calles pinto Stadium

Guanare owns the first division team Llaneros de Guanare Football Club, which operates at the Rafael Calles Pinto Stadium facilities with a capacity for 13,000 people; recently, the Guanare citizen security secretariat formed a team called Atlético Guanare that is participating in the Second Division of Venezuela in the 2017 season. The Carl Herrera Allen Coliseum, more recently called the Guanare City Coliseum, is a multipurpose sports infrastructure which has an approximate capacity for 7,500 people. It was inaugurated in honor of the renowned Venezuelan basketball player Carl Herrera by former governor Iván Colmenarez; It serves as the headquarters of the Llaneros de Guanare FutSal. In the Sports Village of Guanare, erected by former governor Antonia Muñoz, various improvements were currently made, including remodeling work and a new air conditioning system, work undertaken by former state governor Wilmar Castro Soteldo.

In Piritu there is the Limoncito Stadium, the Recreational Park of Piritu, the Covered Gymnasium of Piritu, a Softball Stadium, the Minor Baseball Stadium of Piritu, the Choro Gonzalez Soccer Stadium, the Choro Gonzalez Baseball Stadium, the Stadium de Choro Araguaia, the Maporal Soccer Stadium and the Paujicito Soccer Stadium.

== Education ==
Among the main educational centers of the state we can mention:

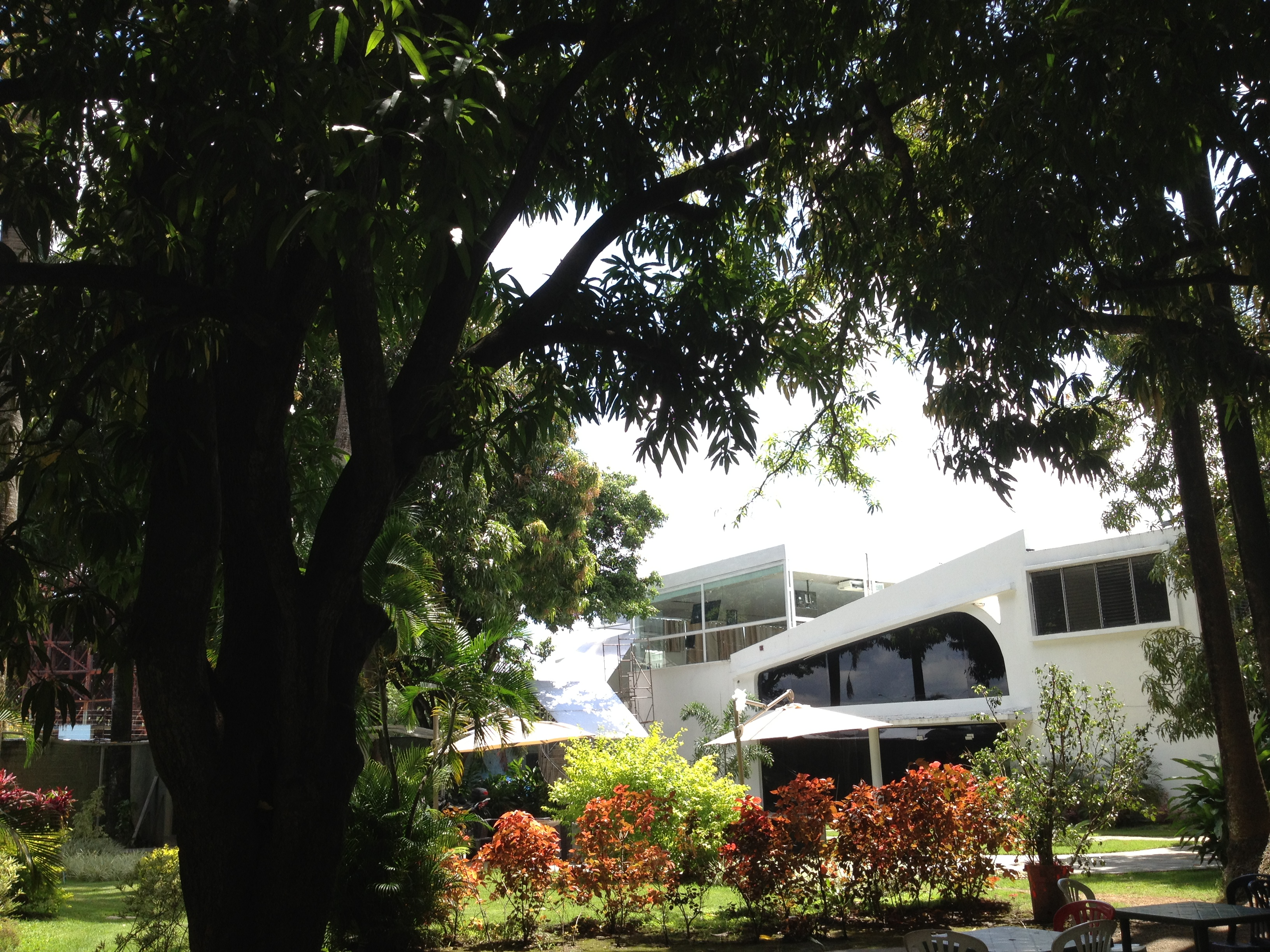
Acarigua-Araure Art Museum

- Simón Rodríguez Núcleo Araure National Experimental University.
- National Experimental University of Los Llanos Ezequiel Zamora
- Francisco de Miranda National Experimental University (UNEFM)
- National Experimental University Romulo Gallegos Portuguese Extension.
- National Open University Guanare Extension
- Portuguesa Polytechnic University of J.J. Montilla (UPTP) Guanare Extension
- Fermín Toro Nucleo Araure-Acarigua University.
- Bolivarian University of Venezuela.
- Yacambú University.
- Universidad de los Andes, Guanare Extension School of Medicine
- Monseñor De Talavera University College Portuguesa-Araure Extension.
- Portuguesa Open National University-Araure Extension.
- Fermín Toro University College Extension Acarigua - Araure
- Unearte: Experimental University for the Arts
- Libertador Experimental Pedagogical University
- National Polytechnic Experimental University of the Bolivarian Armed Forces U.N.E.F.A. Guanare core.

== Culture ==
=== Holidays and traditions ===
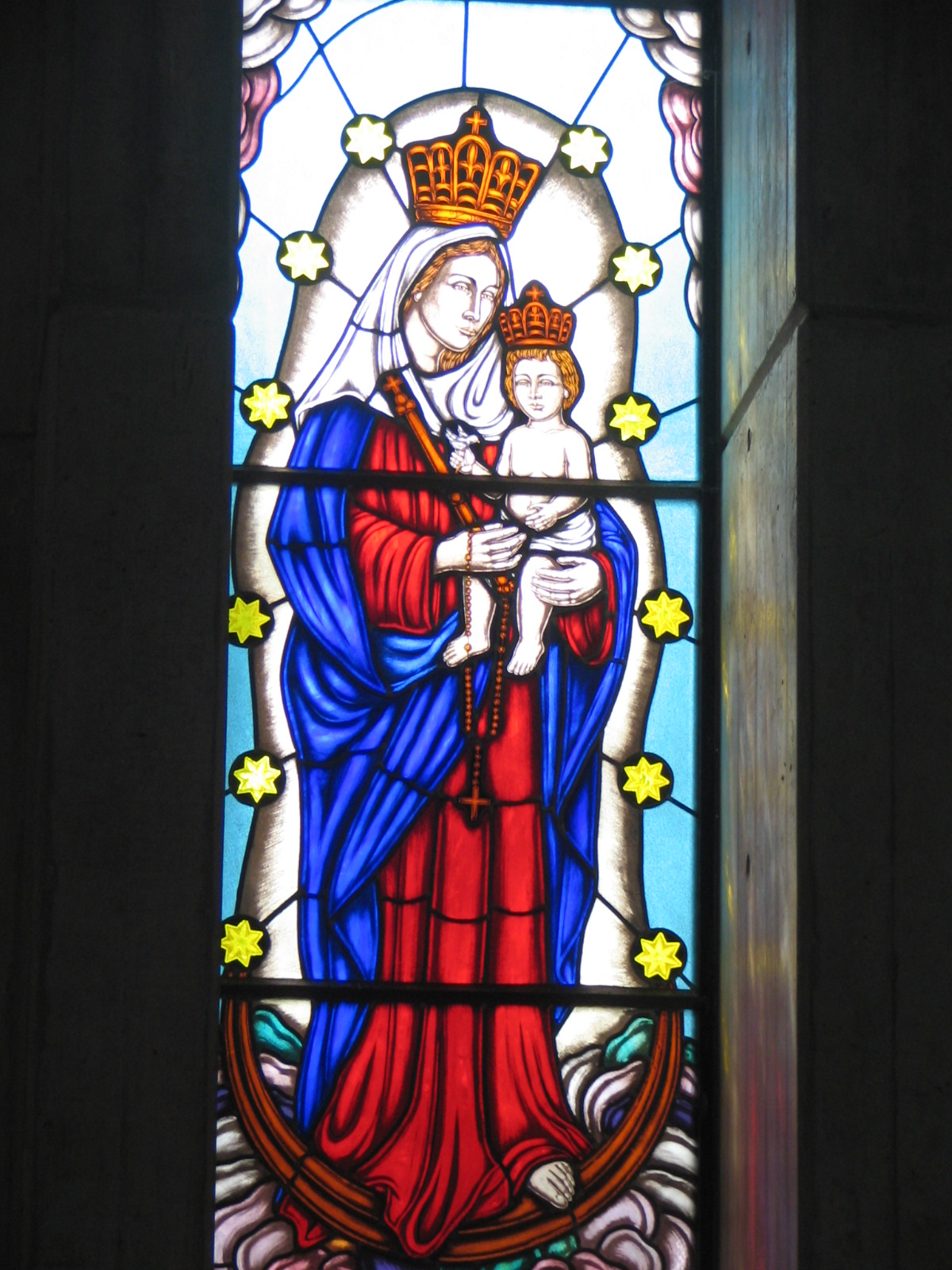
Our lady of Coromoto

The llaneras traditions are closely related to each other, among them are: The Tourist Carnivals of the Páez Municipality with floats and presentation of regional, national and international artists, Christmas in Acarigua with the decoration of the monument La Espiga, in which it is bordered with Christmas lights in the form of the Flag of Venezuela and the "Samán" tree located next to it is wrapped with Christmas lights, on the other hand there is the celebration of the city's birthday every September 29 and its «Tree Lighting», as well as «El Pesebre» and «La Cruz de Mayo», the toilets in the squares, the «Dance of the Holy Innocents» every December 28. In the same way it is celebrated on June 13, the day of San Antonio, at the home of the Goyo Ramírez family in Barrio Ajuro, together with the Civic Parade in honor of the Birth of José Antonio Páez Herrera, «Horseback Riding», «Afternoons of Coleados Bulls »,« Llaneros Sunrises », among others. The Joropo Llanero, is the dance that accompanies the typical Portuguese music. To the rhythm of the Harp, the Four and the Maracas, the couples zapatean, while they make synchronized turns that symbolize the subtle flirtation of the woman and the gallantness and chivalry of the man, together with the challenging spirit of the Venezuelan Llanero.

Among the traditional games are the rounds of the "Game of the Blind Little Chicken", "The Cat and the Mouse", "The Rooster and the Chicken", "The Rice with Milk", "The Tombola", "The Wheelbarrow", «El Escondite», «El Fusilado», «La Zaranda», «Palito Mantequillero». And the Hand Games like the "Spins", "Metras" (Marbles), "Whirligig", "Gurrufios", "Parrots", "The Old One", "The Plane", "Creole Balls" among many others.

In Pirit, with national and international projection, the sending of orchids stands out. This was a tradition initiated by Humberto Gallegos - Chronicler who died of Pituation - who along with his family sent a bouquet of orchids that are sent to Zaragoza-Spain on behalf of the Portuguese state. The orchid bouquet is made with orchid flowers of different varieties and colors from different regions of the country, which are artistically prepared and intertwined with ribbons of the three that form the flag of Venezuela. This religious event was held every October 10 since 1971 starting with the branches that are exhibited on the main street of the town from the first hours of the day and then be taken in parade to the San Rafael Arcángel de Pitu church, where they receive the father's status . In this ceremony the parishioners of different colonies participate as; Italian, Portuguese, Arabic, Spanish, among others, who carry their own orchids to be sent to the Virgen del Pilar de Zaragoza in Spain.

- Tourist carnivals. They begin in 1977. Pioneers in the Portuguese State. Colorful and cheerful parades parade through the main streets and avenues. Pirit acquires the nickname "Capital of Joy" due to the joy and cordiality of its people in the celebration of events, especially in the Tourist Carnivals and Patron Saint Festivities.
- Easter week. Religious activity that brings together a number of parishioners at masses and processions on Thursday and Good Friday.

The night of remembrance. Adults participate highlighting the music of yesteryear. It takes place on Ash Wednesday, at night in race 10 between streets 9 and 10, although this tradition was born in 1972 at the Caney de Florentino and the devil.

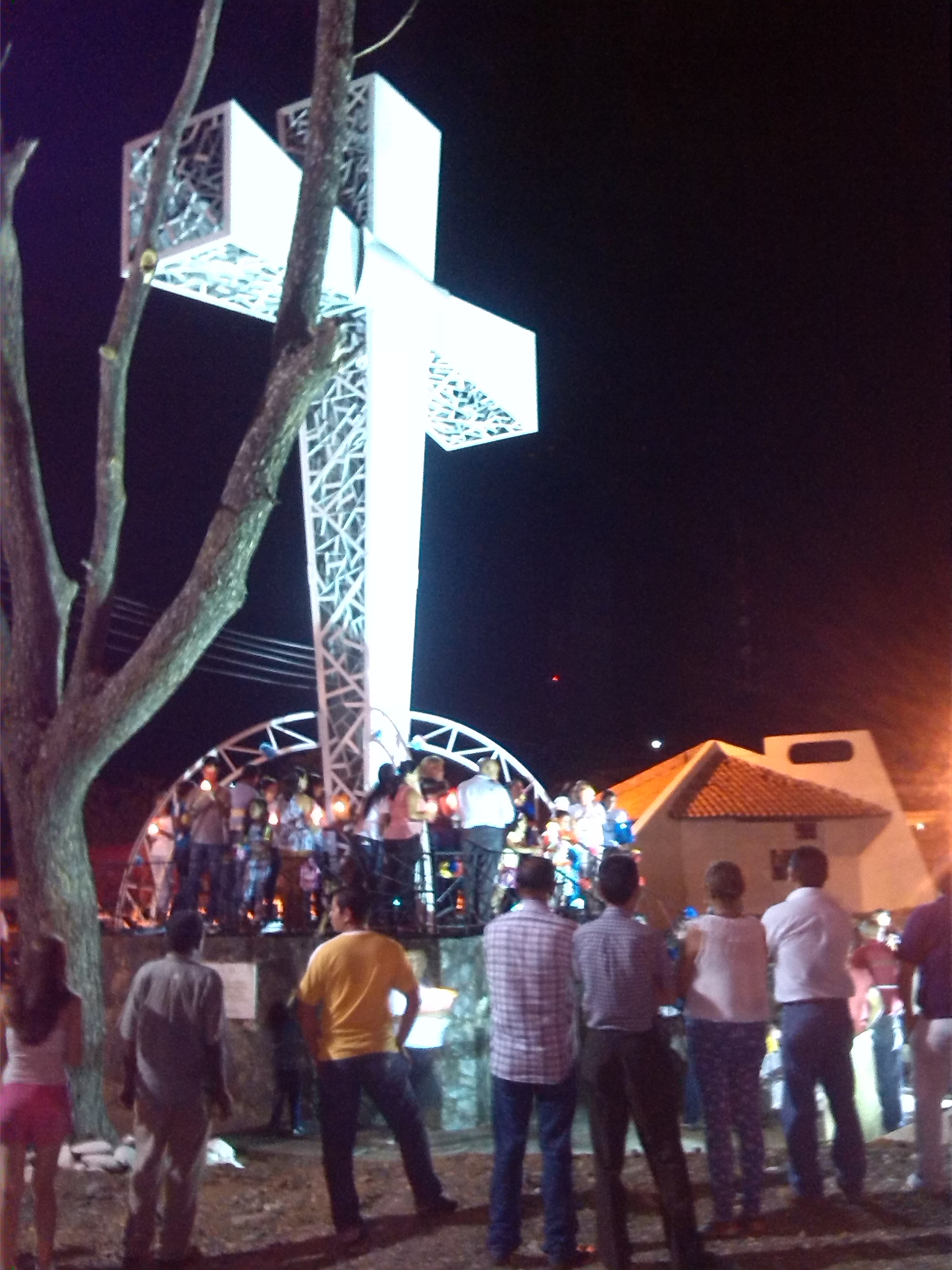
Velorio de la Cruz de Mayo, Portuguesa State

- The retro night. Melodies from the 1960s - 70s and 80s. Presentation of musical ensembles. It begins in 2008 at the age of 25 the night of remembrance on Fridays before the eighth carnival.
- Patron Festivities of Piritu. Celebrated in honor of San Rafael Arcángel every October 24. Procession of the Saint, Burning of Arbolito of fireworks, bulls, sports and recreational activities, exhibitions, cultural events, presentation of orchestras, ensembles and artists among others.

Coromotan orchids Bouquet of orchids that in the name of the Virgen del Coromoto is sent to Zaragoza - Spain. The ceremony is held every October 10 since 1971 in race 8 and the San Rafael Arcángel Church. It is received on October 12 in Zaragoza Hispanic and Discovery Day of America.

== See also ==
- States of Venezuela
- Administrative divisions of Venezuela
