= Battle of Carabobo (1814) =

1814 battle in the Venezuelan War of Independence

- Part of the Venezuelan War of Independence
Date	28 May 1814
Location	Savannah of Carabobo (Present day Carabobo State)
Result	Republican victory

Belligerents
Second Republic of Venezuela	Spain

Commanders and leaders
Simón Bolívar; Santiago Mariño	Juan Manuel Cajigal; José Ceballos

Units involved
4,000–5,000	6,000

Casualties and losses
12 killed 40 wounded	2,100–3,000; Capture of 500 rifles, 9 flags, 400 horses, the entire artillery, food, livestock, baggage and documents.

The First Battle of Carabobo (1814) was a battle in the Venezuelan War of Independence, in which the forces of the Second Republic, commanded by Simón Bolívar, defeated the Spanish forces under Field marshal Juan Manuel de Cajigal y Martínez.

== Records ==
The colonial government was restored in Venezuela after Domingo de Monteverde's successful taking of Caracas on 29 July 1812, during his reconquest campaign. Monteverde planned to launch an offensive against the United Provinces of Nueva Granada. However, before he could execute it, two renegade exiled colonels overtook him early the following year. Simón Bolívar began his Admirable Campaign in the West, while Santiago Mariño reached the East with exiles from Trinidad Island.

Before this desperate situation, Monteverde tried to reconquer Maturín, as the provinces of Guayana, Nueva Barcelona and Cumaná had fallen to Mariño quickly, but he failed on multiple occasions. When he tried to stop Bolivar in the West, he was wounded in battle and was forced to take refuge in Puerto Cabello, where Cajigal relieved him from command.
After Bolívar took Caracas on 6 August 1813, the Royalist forces were reduced to their positions in the nearby Orinoco Valley, Apure and the Province of Coro. Fortunately for them, the arrival of Brigadier José Ceballos with 5,000 Spanish soldiers allowed them to resist the offensive again.

=== Campaign ===
In February 1814, the main threats to the Second Republic of Venezuela were José Tomás Boves's armies in Los Llanos (8,000 men), José Ceballos in the West (4,000 men) and Juan Manuel Cajigal (3,000 men), who had reorganized their forces after the Admirable Campaign, and were starting their offensive. At the same time, Colonel Francisco Rosete (under Boves' orders) was acting wildly in Valles del Tuy. Given this danger, Santiago Mariño finally tried to help Bolivar, but it was too late to contain all their enemies.

On 23 March, the Patriot army in the West and its partner in the East, under the command of Bolívar and Mariño respectively, met in Los Pilones - currently Guárico State - in order to join forces against the Royalists. However, they remained under separate rule and that would be decisive in their future. Most of Bolivar's troops came from the Andean regions in the west, and Mariño's were from the east coast. When many of Mariño's troops began to desert after the Battle of Bocachica (31 March), Bolívar reproached him, even though the same was happening in his own ranks. Also, there were spies from the Royalists in their units. This only increased the tension between the two commanders.

The Spanish army stopped in Guataparo on 16 May after leaving Coro, just a little more than 4 miles away from the city of Valencia, where Ceballos' army was close by. Cajigal assumed a defensive position as he wished to refrain from attacking until Boves had penetrated into the valleys of Aragua. Bolívar left Valencia on 16 May with four divisions, and the next day found Cajigal deployed for combat in Tocuyito. The Patriots attacked the vanguard of the enemy but Cajigal avoided combat and withdrew via San Carlos. to give aid to the army of Ceballos, which had been defeated in its attempt to take Valencia. Solomon and other local commanders recognized him as the new Captain General of Venezuela and commander of the Royalist army. Bolívar retreated to Valencia on the 18th, where he had a better position.

Cajigal again advanced towards Valencia, reaching the outskirts of the city on May 20. Noticing the proximity of the Patriot forces, he retreated and took position in the savanna of Carabobo. Hereafter, the Patriot forces advanced from their positions to the savanna on the 25th, and Bolivar left on the 26th with five divisions and all the horses that were in the city. On the 28th of May, both armies took up positions in the savannah, ready for battle.

== Battle ==
The war began at 3:00 PM, when the division of Rafael Urdaneta opened fire on the enemy who were trying to outflank the Royalists to the right, but this was a trick to distract Cajigal. The main attack occurred straight in the center with José Francisco Bermúdez, Juan Manuel Valdes and Florencio Palacios advancing.

The Royalist Forces resisted for about one hour, under heavy cross-fire, until their center began to break. Then, Marshal Cajigal sent his best troops in, the Carabineros de Granada, to protect that position. In response to this, Bolívar ordered to Santiago Herrera to let the cavalry of José Gregorio Monagas, John Josephus Rondon and Lucas Carvajal attack the Carabineros de Granada, while Diego Jalon's Patriot artillery dedicate themselves to bombard the Royalist Staff position, forcing them to relocate several times without the possibility to react.

After being attacked by the Patriot Lancers' cavalry, the Carabineros de Granada started to retreat, dragging along with them the Royalist infantry, which broke ranks and fled in panic.

The battle ended at 6:00 PM. Cajigal tried to organize an orderly retreat, which was made impossible by the Republican cavalry, which attacked from all sides. The marshal and his staff were barely able to escape with a couple of men.

== Impact ==
Ceballos moved to the East. Cajigal escaped to Apure and granted broad powers to Boves to continue this campaign, but he retired to Los Llanos to take care of his elderly grandmother who was sick with tuberculosis. The battle could have been decisive for Venezuelan independence, but Bolívar, instead of moving to Guárico against Cajigal to end the rebellion of the llaneros with his entire army, which would have been the most sensible decision, opted to divide them. He ordered General Rafael Urdaneta to march to the West with 700 infantrymen. He sent a division of 400 infantry and 700 cavalry after Cajigal and Ceballos to prevent them from supporting Boves. He decided to go to Valencia, José Félix Ribas was sent to reinforce Caracas and Santiago Mariño was stationed in Aragua with 3,000 men. Mariño camped in Villa de Cura, where he could attack Los Llanos, a Royalist stronghold.
Meanwhile, José Tomás Boves left with a powerful Royalist army from Calabozo in a campaign that ended in the Second battle of La Puerta.

== Bibliography ==
- Edgar Esteves González (2004). Batallas de Venezuela, 1810-1824. Caracas: El Nacional. ISBN 978-980-388-074-3.
