= Páez Municipality, Portuguesa =

Municipality in Portuguesa, Venezuela

Páez Municipality Municipio Páez
- Municipality
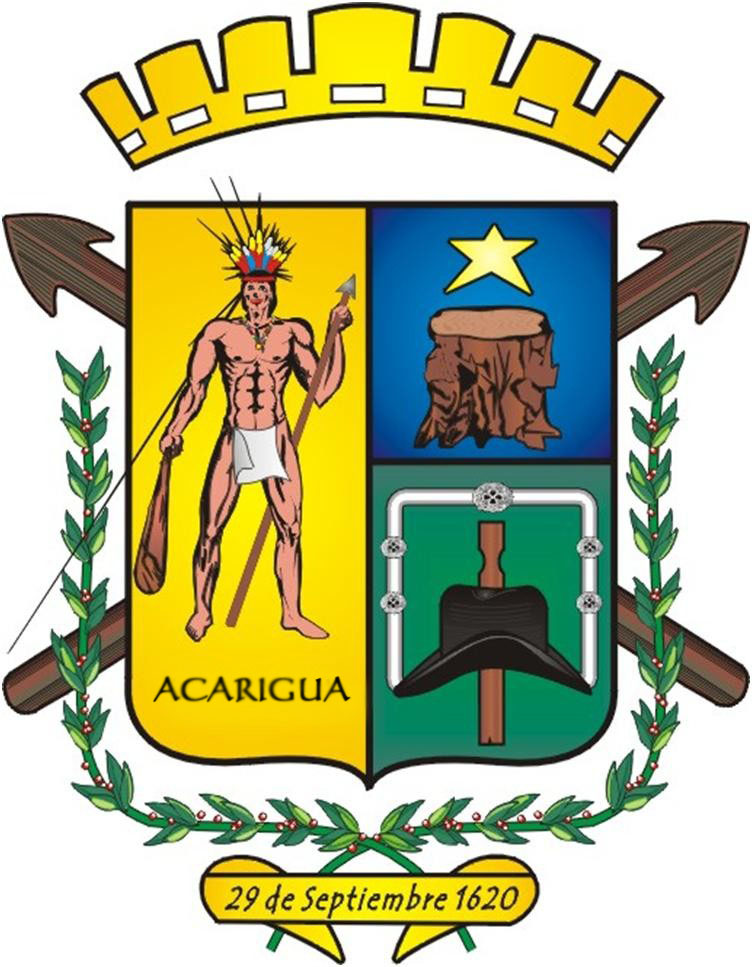
- Flag Seal

- Location in Portuguesa

- Location in Venezuela
- Country: Venezuela
- State: Portuguesa
- Municipal seat: Acarigua

Government
  - Mayor: José Ángel López Garcia (PSUV)

Area
  - Total: 425 km^{2} (164 sq mi)

Population (2023)
  - Total: 306,827
  - Density: 722/km^{2} (1,870/sq mi)
- Time zone: UTC−4 (VET)

Páez Municipality is located in Portuguesa, Venezuela. It owes its name to the Venezuelan military and political figure José Antonio Páez. The municipality has a total surface of 425 km^{2} and it has some 306,827 inhabitant (2023 census). Its capital is Acarigua.
