= San Genaro de Boconoíto Municipality =

Municipality in Portuguesa, Venezuela

San Genaro de Boconoíto Municipality Municipio San Genaro de Boconoíto
- Municipality
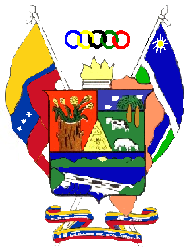
- Flag Seal

- Location in Portuguesa

- Location in Venezuela
- Country: Venezuela
- State: Portuguesa
- Founded: 1989
- Municipal seat: Boconoíto

Government
  - Mayor: Evelio Ramón Montilla Duran (PSUV)

Population (2019)
  - Total: 31,369
- Time zone: UTC−4 (VET)

San Genaro de Boconoíto Municipality is located in Portuguesa, Venezuela. It was founded in 1989. The municipality has a total surface of 1031 km^{2} and it has some 31,369 inhabitant (2019 census). Its capital is Boconoíto.
