= Battle of Araure =

Coordinates: 9°34′N 69°13′W

- Part of the Venezuelan War of Independence (Military career of Simón Bolívar)
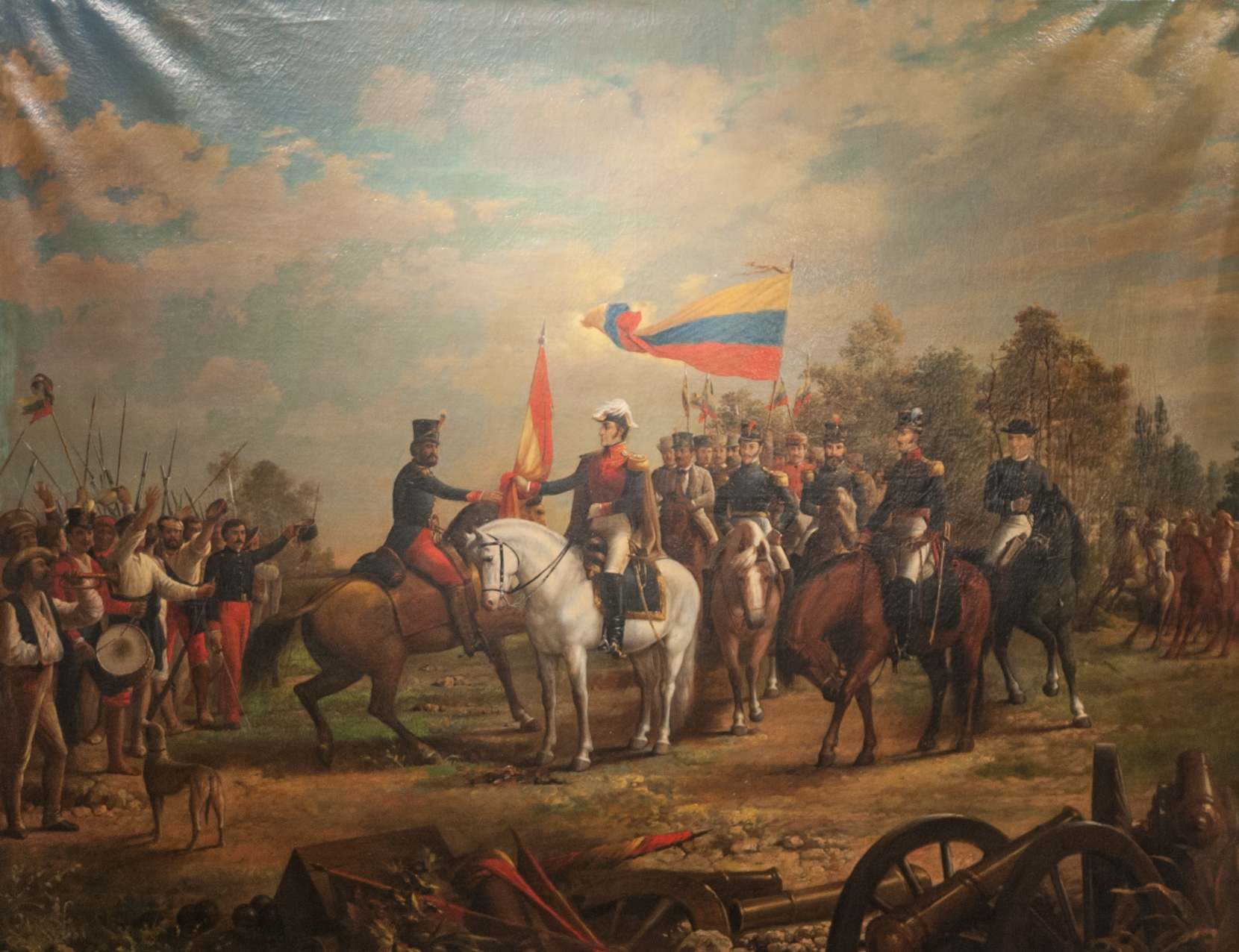
- Bolivar hands over the captured flag of Numancia to his battalion without name
Date	5 December 1813
Location	Araure, Venezuela
Result	Patriot victory

Belligerents
Patriots	(Spain) Royalists

Commanders and leaders
Simón Bolívar	(Spain) José Ceballos

Strength
3,000 infantry and cavalry	3,500–5,000 infantry 500 cavalry

Casualties and losses
800 dead	1,000 dead

The Battle of Araure was fought during the short-lived Second Republic of Venezuela on 5 December 1813, in the city of Araure in Portuguesa State, Venezuela. Simon Bolivar's force defeated General José Ceballos.

== Prelude ==
After the Admirable Campaign, Simón Bolívar had reconquered the capital Caracas in August 1813, but large area's of Venezuela remained under Royalist control.
The Spanish Governor of Coro Province, José Ceballos, had gathered 1,300 soldiers and advanced towards Valencia. He was joined by the 2,500 men under command of José Antonio Yáñez and defeated a Patriot force in the Battle of Tierrita Blanca on 10 November. Bolivar, summoned all the men that he could, and advanced to meet Ceballos, what occurred near a place called Araure.

== The battle ==
The actual battle began early in the morning of 5 December and lasted for around six hours. It was clear that the Royalist troops were numerically superior to the Venezuelan Patriots. The Royalists had a total of 3,500 to 5,000 (depending upon the source) soldiers, while the patriots had some 3,000 men. Despite the superiority of the Royalists, the Patriots would go on to win the battle.

Bolivar would later tell his troops:

Your valor has earned yesterday a name for your corps, and through the midst of the fighting, when I saw you succeed, I named you the Victorious Battalion of Araure. You removed the enemy's flags in the moment of your victory; you have earned the famous, invincible call of Numancia.

== Links ==
- Bolivar's words after the Battle (in Spanish) : es:Batalla de Araure
- Size of the Spanish Force (1)
- Size of the Venezuelan and Spanish Force (2)
