= San Rafael de Onoto Municipality =

Municipality in Portuguesa, Venezuela

San Rafael de Onoto Municipality Municipio San Rafael de Onoto
- Municipality
- Location in Portuguesa

- Location in Venezuela
- Country: Venezuela
- State: Portuguesa
- Municipal seat: San Rafael de Onoto

Government
  - Mayor: Yasmina Harris (PSUV)

Area
  - Total: 187 km^{2} (72 sq mi)

Population (2011)
  - Total: 18,403
  - Density: 98.4/km^{2} (255/sq mi)
- Time zone: UTC−4 (VET)

San Rafael de Onoto Municipality is located in Portuguesa, Venezuela. The municipality has a total surface of 187 km^{2} and it has some 18,403 inhabitant (2011 census). Its capital is San Rafael de Onoto.
