= Manuel García de Sena =

Venezuelan translator of American revolutionary texts

Manuel García de Sena y Silva (c. 1780 – before 1838 (Note: The year of García de Sena's death is unknown; he does not appear in sources after 1816 but was known to have died by 1838.)) was a Venezuelan translator. His translations of revolutionary texts of the United States while living in Philadelphia—including Thomas Paine's Common Sense, the United States Declaration of Independence and the Constitution of the United States—contributed to the independence movement in Spanish America during the 1810s. These translations were widely distributed and influenced the early constitutions of several Latin American republics. After returning to South America, García de Sena held positions in the revolutionary government of Cartagena Province.

== Biography ==
García de Sena was born c. 1780 to Ramón García de Sena y Rodríguez and raised in La Victoria, Aragua. García de Sena was the brother of Venezuelan poet and journalist Ramón García de Sena y Silva. He was a cadet in an Aragua militia battalion in 1802 under Bernardo Rodríguez del Toro Ascanio, the father-in-law of Simón Bolívar. He joined his brother Domingo in Philadelphia in 1803, where he was exposed to American revolutionary literature.

Starting in 1810, García de Sena began translating these texts into Spanish, starting with the works of Paine. In 1811, he completed a compilation of Paine's works, in which he included the Declaration of Independence, the Constitution and several state constitutions, entitled La Independencia de la Costa Firme justificada por Thomas Paine treinta años ha. The 288-page volume was printed in Philadelphia in the mid-summer of 1811 and was shortened in later editions to La Independencia.

The full title of La Independencia indicated García de Sena's revolutionary sympathies in applying the American texts to the situation in Spanish America; translated into English, it reads The Independence of Costa Firme (Note: "Costa Firme" refers to parts of present-day Colombia, Panama and Venezuela.) as Justified by Thomas Paine Thirty Years Ago. In a preface to the volume, García de Sena spoke admiringly of the freedom and prosperity he had experienced in the United States, describing the U.S. government of the United States as "perhaps the most beautiful that has ever existed upon the earth" and desired the same happiness for his homeland. The revolutionary import of García de Sena's translation was well-understood; when Juan Domingo de Monteverde took power as the Spanish captain general of Venezuela in 1812, one of first acts was to seize copies of García de Sena's work.

In 1812, García de Sena translated John M'Culloch's 1797 Concise History of the United States as Historia Concisa de los Estados Unidos desde el Descubrimiento de la América hasta 1807, which included a revised Spanish version of the Declaration of Independence. This volume was dedicated to the "Spanish Americans" in support of their fight for independence. He was one of several translators of U.S. and European texts that influenced the South American revolutions, including Francisco de Miranda, Juan Picornell and Miguel de Pombo.

In addition to his translation work, García de Sena was active in revolutionary politics. In 1814, he was a representative in the revolutionary government in Cartagena, and in 1815, he was secretary of war under Cartagena governor Pedro Gual Escandón. In this latter capacity he performed sensitive missions for Gual and met with Bolívar at Mompós. García de Sena fell out of the historical record beginning in 1816 but was known to have died by 1838.

== Legacy ==
Although few Latin Americans likely read García de Sena's translations, they had a significant effect on constitutional development in the region. La Independencia was rapidly distributed through the region. The first constitutions of Venezuela (1811), Argentina (1819), Mexico (1824), Uruguay (1830) and Chile were influenced by García de Sena's translations of constitutional texts from the United States.

García de Sena produced the earliest translations of Paine's work into Spanish alongside indigenous Peruvian Anselmo Nateu, who published under the name Manuel José de Arrunategui and who also produced a translation of Paine in London in 1811.
