= Ospino =

Ospino, Portuguesa
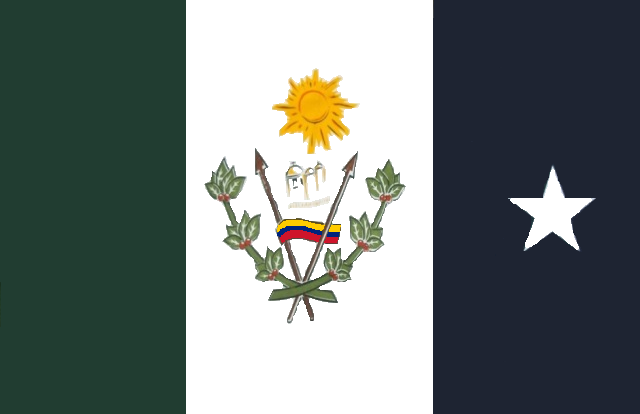
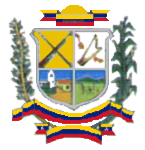
- Flag Coat of arms

- Ospino Municipality in Portuguesa State

- Location within Venezuela
- Coordinates: 09°18′N 69°27′W
- Country: Venezuela
- State: Portuguesa
- Municipality: Ospino
- Founded: 1713

Government
  - Mayor: Yongeybi Yépez Alvarado (PSUV)

Area
  - Total: 1,675 km^{2} (647 sq mi)

Population (2001)
  - Total: 39,215
  - Demonym: Ospinense
- Time zone: UTC-4:30 (VST)
  - Summer (DST): UTC-4:30 (not observed)
- Area code: 0256
- Climate: Aw
- Website: ospino-portuguesa.gob.ve
- The area and population figures are for the municipality

Ospino is a town in the Venezuelan state of Portuguesa. This town is the shire town of the Ospino Municipality and, according to the 2001 Venezuelan census, the municipality has a population of 39,215.
