= Sucre Municipality, Portuguesa =

Municipality in Portuguesa, Venezuela

Sucre Municipality Municipio Sucre
- Municipality
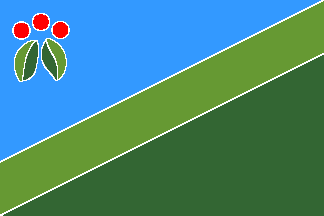
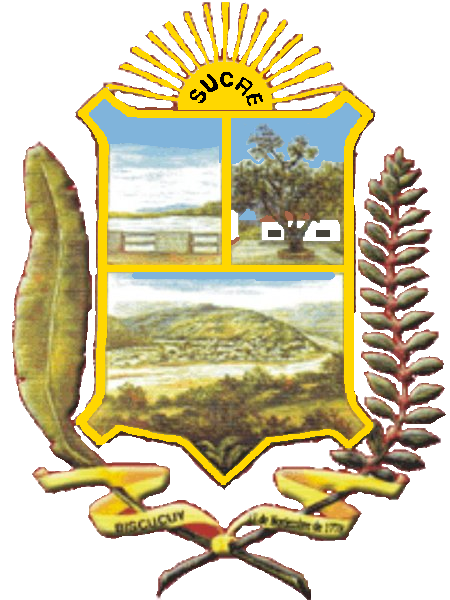
- Flag Seal

- Location in Portuguesa

- Location in Venezuela
- Country: Venezuela
- State: Portuguesa
- Founded: 1891
- Municipal seat: Biscucuy

Government
  - Mayor: María Morillo (PSUV)

Area
  - Total: 400 km^{2} (150 sq mi)

Population (2011)
  - Total: 46,731
  - Density: 120/km^{2} (300/sq mi)
- Time zone: UTC−4 (VET)

Sucre Municipality is located in Portuguesa, Venezuela. The municipality has a total surface of 400 km^{2} and it has some 46,731 inhabitant (2011 census). Its capital is Biscucuy.
