= Papelón Municipality =

Municipality in Portuguesa, Venezuela

Papelón Municipality Municipio Papelón
- Municipality
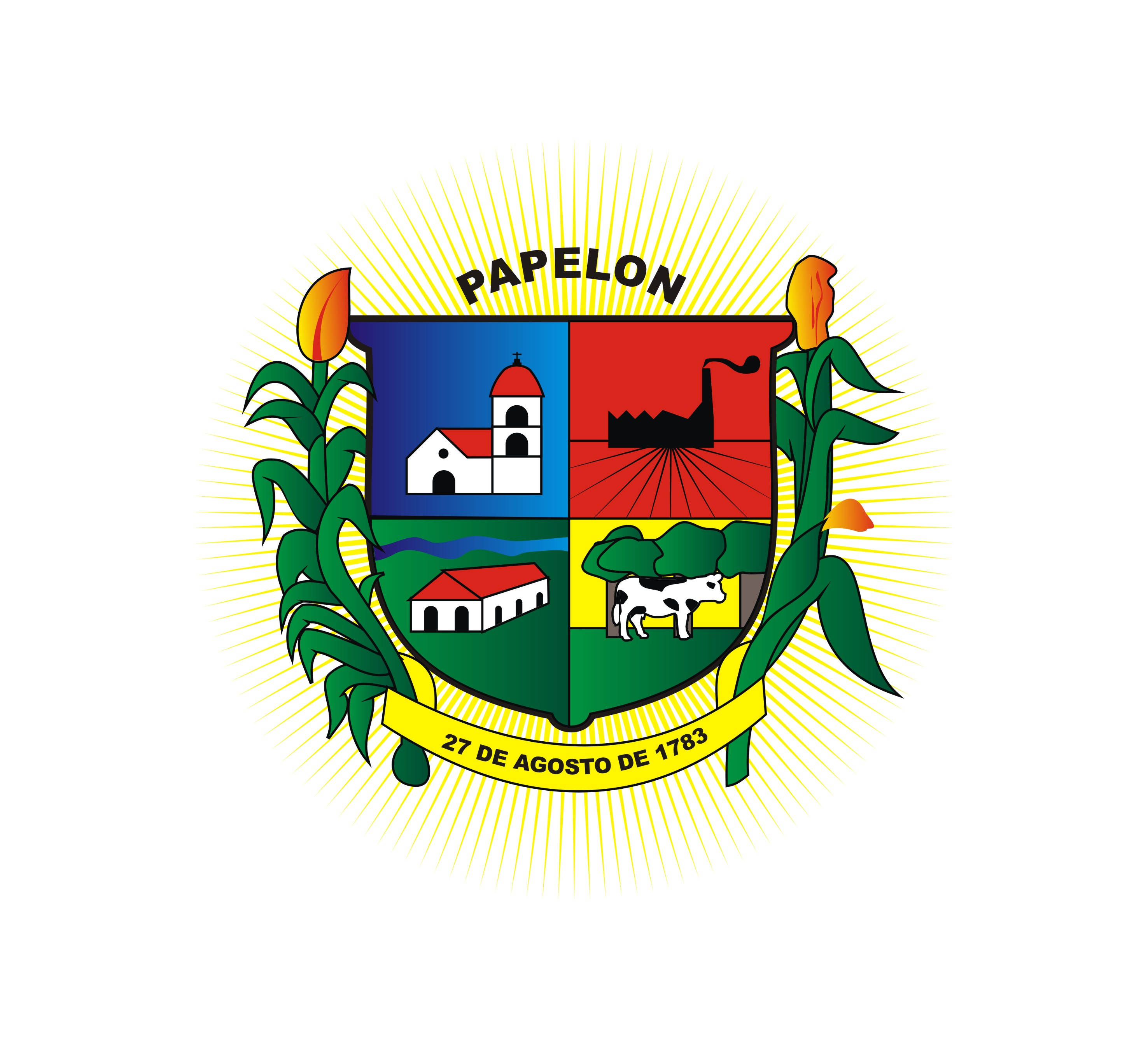
- Seal

- Location in Portuguesa

- Location in Venezuela
- Country: Venezuela
- State: Zulia
- Municipal seat: Papelón

Government
  - Mayor: José Díaz Vargas (PSUV)

Area
  - Total: 2,203 km^{2} (851 sq mi)

Population (2011)
  - Total: 16,643
  - Density: 7.555/km^{2} (19.57/sq mi)
- Time zone: UTC−4 (VET)

Papelón Municipality is located in Portuguesa, Venezuela. The municipality has a total surface of 2203 km^{2} and it has some 16,643 inhabitant (2011 census). Its capital is Papelón.
