= Esteller Municipality =

Municipality in Portuguesa, Venezuela

Esteller Municipality Municipio Esteller
- Municipality
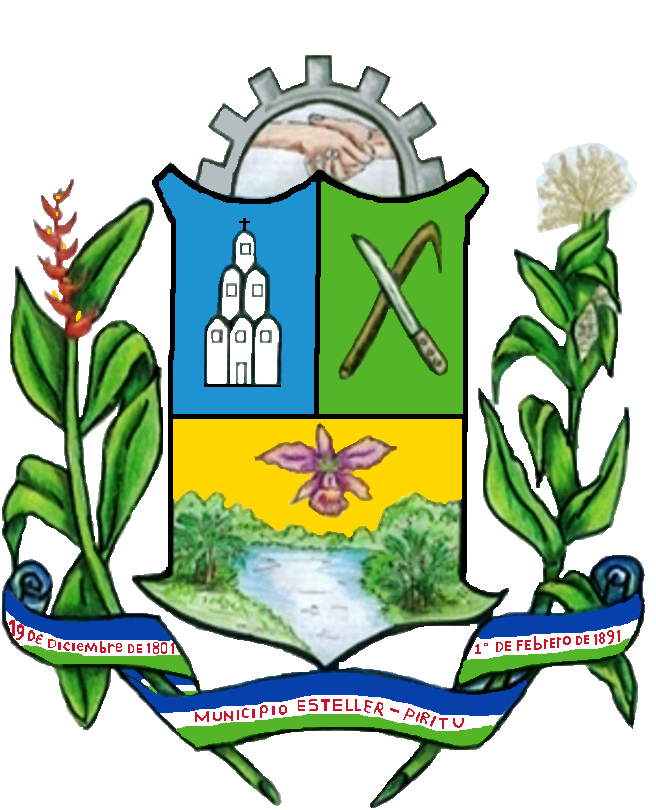
- Flag Seal

- Location in Portuguesa

- Location in Venezuela
- Country: Venezuela
- State: Zulia
- Founded: 1891
- Municipal seat: Píritu

Government
  - Mayor: Jorge Oviedo Alvarado (PSUV)

Area
  - Total: 754 km^{2} (291 sq mi)

Population (2011)
  - Total: 50,513
  - Density: 67.0/km^{2} (174/sq mi)
- Time zone: UTC−4 (VET)

Esteller Municipality is located in Portuguesa, Venezuela. It was founded in 1891. The municipality has a total surface of 754 km^{2} and it has some 50,513 inhabitant (2011 census). Its capital is Píritu
