= José Ceballos =

José Ceballos was a Spanish Brigadier during the Venezuelan War of Independence and Governor of Coro Province in Venezuela in 1810 at the outbreak of the revolution.

== Biography ==
He was a protégé of the Captain General of Venezuela Vicente Emparan, and remained faithful to Spain at the outbreak of the Spanish-American independence revolution in 1810.

He defeated a Patriot army under command of the Marquis del Toro on 28 November 1810. In March 1812, he sent a column under the command of frigate captain Domingo de Monteverde, who led a dazzling military campaign that concluded with the fall of the First Republic of Venezuela in 1812.

José Ceballos insisted on the need to attract the mestizos and slaves to the Royalist cause. In October 1813, he marched at the head of a division of 1,300 men, from Coro heading towards Barquisimeto. On the 19th of the same month he defeated a Republican detachment commanded by Colonel Manuel Aldao in Bobare, near Barquisimeto. Aware of this offensive, General Simón Bolívar advanced towards Barquisimeto and there, on 10 November, he was defeated by Ceballos. Bolívar retired to Valencia, where he reorganized his forces against Ceballos, who had advanced to Araure prior to the incorporation of the column commanded by José Yáñez. On 5 December, Ceballos presented battle to Bolívar and was defeated by the Republicans in the Battle of Araure.

He returned to Coro and at the beginning of 1814 he marched again with about 1,000 combatants against the Patriots. He gained two victories at Barquisimeto and Arao near San Carlos, but was decisively beaten at the Battle of Carabobo (1814).

In 1815, General Pablo Morillo appointed Ceballos as temporary governor of Caracas until he was relieved due to disagreements. He was replaced on 4 June 1816 by the expeditionary leader Salvador de Moxó y Quadrado who added the governorship of Caracas to his position as Captain General of Venezuela. Nothing more is known of Ceballos after this date.
