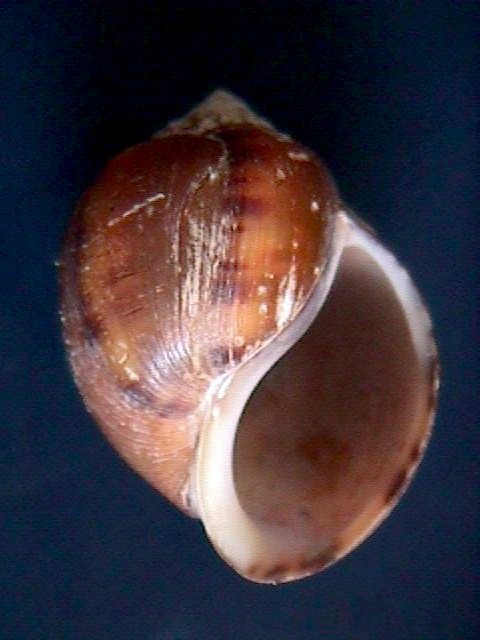
- Apertural view of a shell of Pomacea interrupta

Conservation status
- Data Deficient (IUCN 3.1)

Scientific classification
- Kingdom: Animalia
- Phylum: Mollusca
- Class: Gastropoda
- Subclass: Caenogastropoda
- Order: Architaenioglossa
- Family: Ampullariidae
- Genus: Pomacea
- Species: P. interrupta

Binomial name
- Pomacea interrupta (Sowerby III, 1909)

Synonyms
- Ampullaria interrupta Sowerby, 1909; Ampullarius (Limnopomus) interruptus (Sowerby, 1909)

= Pomacea interrupta =

Species of freshwater

Pomacea interrupta is a species of freshwater snail in the family Ampullariidae. It is known from Laguna de Urao in Venezuela.
