= Second Battle of La Puerta =

1814 battle in the Venezuelan War of Independence

- Part of Venezuelan War of Independence
Date	15 June 1814
Location	Quebrada de La Puerta, Villa de Cura 10°02′18″N 67°29′21″W
Result	Royalist victory
Territorial changes	Fall of Caracas to the Royalists

Belligerents
United Provinces of Venezuela	Spanish Empire

Commanders and leaders
Simón Bolívar; Santiago Mariño; José Tadeo (WIA); Manuel Cedeño	José Tomás Boves; Francisco Tomás Morales

Strength
3,000 men 9 canons	7,500; 2 canons

Casualties and losses
1,000 dead 1,500 prisoners killed	200 dead
- Location within Venezuela

The Second Battle of La Puerta (Spanish: Segunda Batalla de La Puerta) was fought between Royalists of the Spanish Empire and the Second Republic of Venezuela on 15 June 1814. It was a crushing defeat for the Republicans and a turning point in the war that led to the fall of the Second Republic of Venezuela.

== The Battle ==
The Republicans had won the Battle of Carabobo on 28 May and had become overconfident when they decided to confront the irregular Royalist army, made up mainly of llanero horsemen, commanded by José Tomás Boves. The two armies met at the gorges of La Puerta, near the Sémen River and San Juan de Los Morros, in the current state of Guárico.

During the battle, José Tomás Boves and his forces inflicted heavy casualties on Bolívar's army, resulting in the death of over many of Bolívar's soldiers. Following the battle, over 60 officers were captured and to be executed by firing squad. Among these prisoners was Colonel Diego Talon, who was hanged the day after the battle in Cura.

Bolívar and his men would forced to retreat out of La Puerta, with Bolívar fleeing towards Caracas, while Mariño going to Cumana.

== Consequences ==
On 18 June, Bolívar and Mariño arrived in Caracas with 400 survivors, closely pursued by the Royalist vanguard of Captain Ramón González (1,500 cavalry). On 25 June, José Félix Ribas and 400 cavalry managed to stop González's division and delay its advance to the capital. Meanwhile, Boves had decided to first besiege Valencia with the bulk of his army, but its garrison resisted during 21 days.

The heroic resistance of Valencia, gave the Republicans the time to regroup in Caracas. Ribas only managed to gather less than 2,000 soldiers. It was obvious that it was impossible to defend the capital and on 6 July, Bolívar evacuated Caracas and two thirds of the population, in a long march that is known as the Emigration to East.

== Links ==
- Cavim
- Historias que merecen ser contadas
- Bibliofep
