= Araure =

- Nuestra Señora del Pilar de Araure
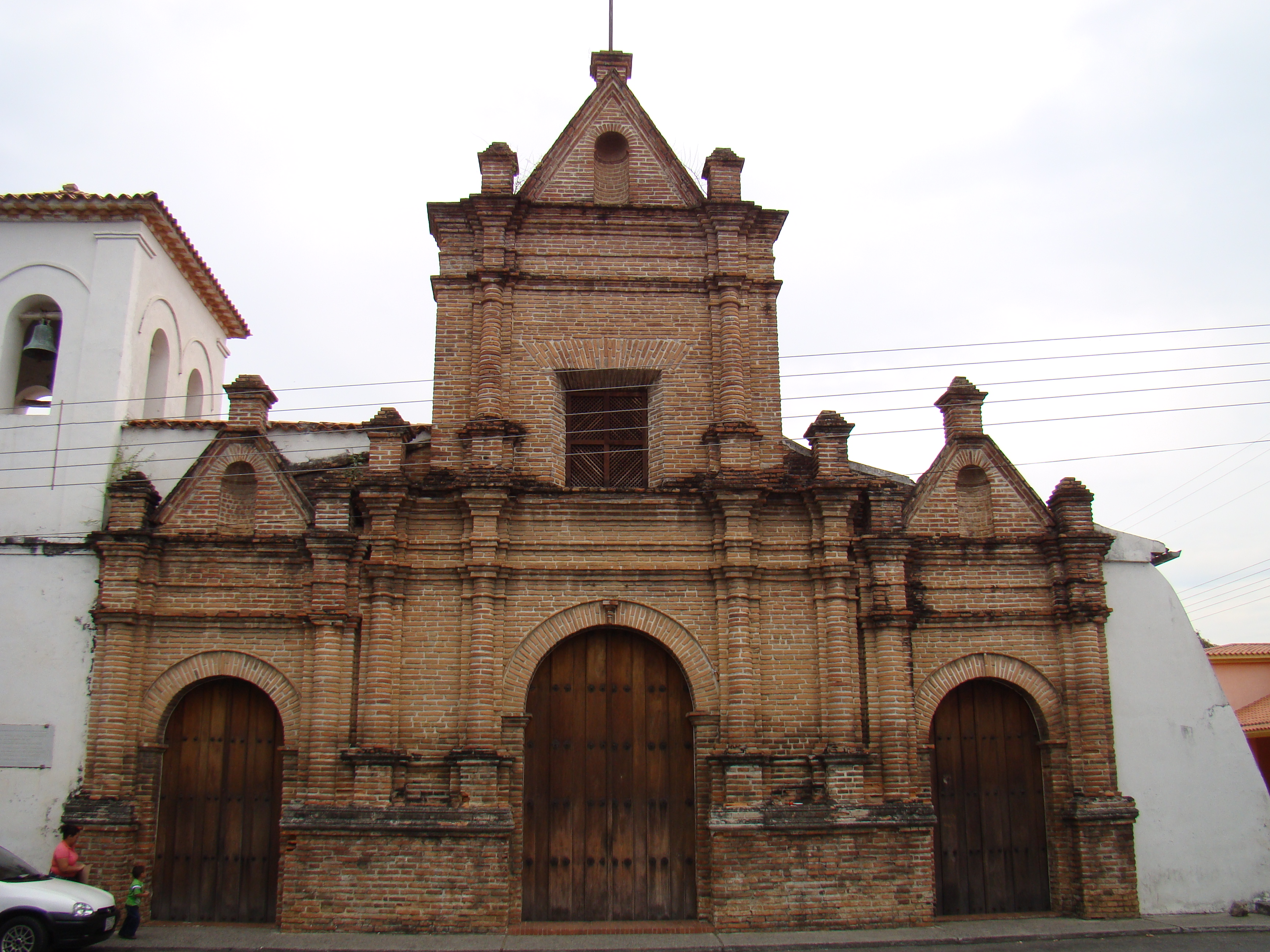

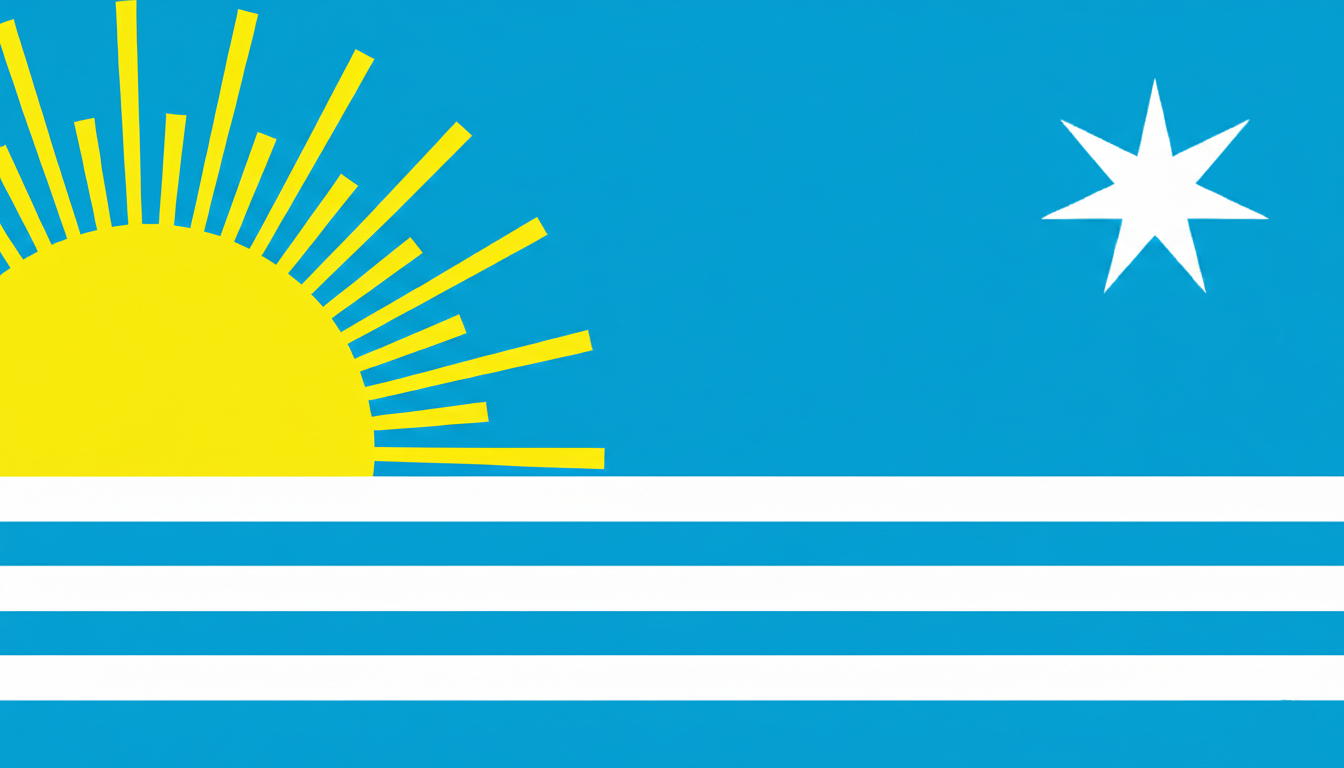
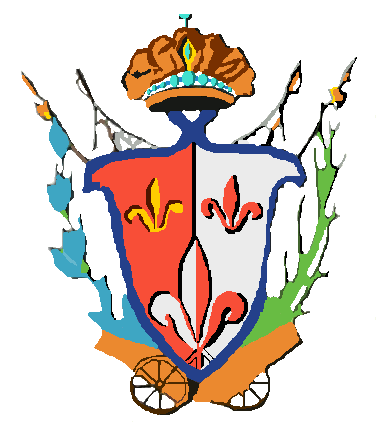
- Flag Coat of arms

- Location within Venezuela Location within South America
- Coordinates: 9°38′58″N 69°14′31″W
- Country: Venezuela
- State: Portuguesa
- Municipality: Araure
- Founded: July 6, 1694

Government
  - Mayor: José Rafael Vásquez (MVR)

Area
  - Total: 144.166 km^{2} (55.663 sq mi)
- Elevation: 198 m (650 ft)

Population (2012)
  - Total: 11,908
  - Density: 82.599/km^{2} (213.93/sq mi)
  - Demonym: Araureño(a)
- Demonym: Araureño / a
- Time zone: UTC-4:30 (VST)
  - Summer (DST): UTC-4:30 (not observed)
- Postal code: (+58) 255
- Area code: 0255
- Climate: Aw
- Website: Official website

Araure (Spanish pronunciation: [aˈɾawɾe]) is a town in the Venezuelan state of Portuguesa. This town is the seat of the Araure Municipality and, according to the 2001 Venezuelan census, the municipality has a population of 111,908.

== History ==
Araure was founded on July 6, 1694, as Nuestra Señora del Pilar de Araure.

== Demographics ==
The Araure Municipality, according to the 2001 Venezuelan census, has a population of 111,908 (up from 75,811 in 1990). This amounts to 15.4% of Portuguesa's population. The municipality's population density is 452.9 inhabitants per square mile (174.9/km^{2}).

== Government ==
Araure is the seat of the Araure Municipality in Portuguesa. The mayor is José Rafael Vásquez, elected in 2004 with 44% of the vote. He replaced Armando Rodriguez shortly after the last municipal elections in October 2004.
