= Merino (surname) =

The coat of arms of the Merino Surname

Merino is a surname of Spanish origin, commonly found in Navarre, Burgos, and Seville. The surname originates from the medieval Latin maiorinus, a steward or head official of a village, from maior, meaning "greater".

== People with the name ==
- Adalberto Almeida y Merino, (1916-2008), Mexican prelate of the Roman Catholic Church
- Alba Merino (born 1985), Spanish footballer
- Alexander Merino (born 1992), Peruvian tennis player
- Alfredo Merino Tamayo (born 1969), Spanish footballer and manager
- Ana Merino (born 1971), Spanish poet
- Ángel Merino (born 1966) Spanish footballer and manager
- Arturo Merino Benítez (1888–1970), Chilean aviator
- Aquilino Bocos Merino, C.M.F. (born 1938), Spanish prelate of the Catholic Church
- Beatriz Merino (born 1947), Prime Minister of Peru (Jun 2003 - Dec)
- Camila Merino, Chilean civil engineer and government minister
- Carlos Merino (born 1980), Spanish footballer
- Delfina Merino (born 1989), Argentine field hockey player
- Diego Merino (born 1988), Spanish football manager
- Diego Merino (1570–1637), Roman Catholic bishop
- Eider Merino Cortazar (born 1994), Spanish cyclist
- Emilio Merino (born 1950), Chilean politician
- Esteban Gabriel Merino (died 1535), Spanish Roman Catholic bishop and cardinal
- Evaristo Merino (fl. 1900–1930), Chilean politician
- Fernando Arturo de Merino (1833–1906), Dominican priest and politician
- Francisca Merino (born 1973), Chilean actress
- Francisco Merino, Spanish karate practitioner
- Gustavo Gutiérrez Merino (born 1928), Peruvian philosopher and Dominican priest
- Ignacio Merino (1817–1876), Peruvian painter
- Igor Merino (born 1990), Spanish cyclist
- Jerónimo Merino (1769–1844), Spanish guerrilla fighter and priest
- Jesus Merino (born 1965), Spanish comic book artist
- John Merino (1967–2009), Ecuadorian colonel
- Jorge Merino (born 1991), Spanish footballer
- José Francisco Merino (born 1952), Salvadoran politician
- José Merino del Río (1949–2012), Costa Rican politician
- José Luis Merino (1927–2019), Spanish film director
- José María Merino (born 1941), Spanish novelist
- José Toribio Merino (1915–1996), Chilean admiral
- Juan Merino (born 1970), Spanish footballer and manager
- Julia Merino (born 1971), Spanish Olympic sprinter
- Manuel Merino (born 1961), Peruvian politician and former president
- Maria J. Merino (born 1950) Spanish pathologist and physician-scientist
- Mercedes Pérez Merino (born 1960), Spanish trade unionist and politician
- Mikel Merino (born 1996), Spanish footballer
- Olga Merino (born 1965), Spanish writer
- Pedro Merino (born 1987), Spanish cyclist
- Próspero Merino (1943–1981), Peruvian footballer
- Ramón Merino Loo (born 1960), Mexican politician
- Roberto Merino (born 1982), Peruvian footballer
- Roberto Merino (writer) (born 1961), Chilean writer
- Rolando Meriño (born 1971), Cuban Olympic baseball player
- Sabin Merino (born 1992), Spanish footballer
- Vicente Merino (1889–1977), Chilean naval officer and political figure
- Víctor Merino (born 1979), Salvadoran footballer
- Ingrid Wildi Merino (born 1963), Chilean-born Swiss video artist

== See also ==
- Marino (disambiguation)
- Merino (disambiguation)
