= Marino railway station =

Marino railway station can refer to:

- Marino railway station, Adelaide, a metro station in Adelaide, South Australia
- Marino railway station (Northern Ireland), a railway station in Holywood, County Down, Northern Ireland

== See also ==
- Maryino (Moscow Metro), a metro station in Maryino District, South-Eastern Administrative Okrug, Moscow, Russia
- Marino (disambiguation)
