= Merani =

Merani may refer to:

- Alipur Merani, a subdivision of Alipur Tehsil in Pakistan
- Ricardo Merani, Indonesian footballer
- Merani language, a Papuan language of New Guinea
- Merani, Iran, a village in Vilkij-e Markazi Rural District, Vilkij District, Namin County, Ardabil Province, Iran
- FC Merani Martvili, a Georgian association football club based in Martvili
- FC Merani Tbilisi, a Georgian football club based in Tbilisi

== See also ==
- Merini
