= Marinho =

Marinho is both a given name and a Portuguese surname. Notable people with the name include:

Given name

- Marinho Peres (born 1947), a Brazilian footballer

Surname

- António Marinho e Pinto (born 1950), Portuguese lawyer and former journalist, and member of the European Parliament
- Carlos Henrique Carneiro Marinho (born 1993), a Brazilian footballer
- David Luiz (David Luiz Moreira Marinho; born 1987), a Brazilian footballer
- Jair Marinho de Oliveira (1936–2020), a Brazilian footballer
- João Roberto Marinho (born 1953), Brazilian businessman
- José Roberto Marinho (born 1955), Brazilian businessman
- Lily Marinho (1921–2011), Brazilian philanthropist and socialite
- Maneca (Manuel Marinho Alves; 1926–1961)
- Marcelo dos Santos Marinho (born 1984), a Brazilian footballer
- Marinho Chagas (Francisco das Chagas Marinho; 1952–2014), a Brazilian footballer
- Roberto Irineu Marinho (born 1947), Brazilian businessman
- Roberto Marinho (1904–2003), a Brazilian publisher and businessman
- Tainah Marinho (born 1996), Brazilian politician
- Wellington Damião Nogueira Marinho (born 1981), a Brazilian footballer
- João Marinho Neto (born 1912), a Brazilian supercentenarian and the oldest living man since November 2024

Nickname

- Mairon César Reis (born 1979), a Brazilian footballer
- Marinho (footballer, born 1943), a Portuguese footballer
- Marinho (footballer, born 1955), a Brazilian footballer
- Marinho (footballer, born 1957) (1957–2020), a Brazilian footballer
- Marinho (footballer, born 1970), a Portuguese footballer
- Marinho (footballer, born 1983), a Portuguese footballer
- Marinho (futsal player), a Portuguese futsal player
- Marinho (footballer, born 1990), a Brazilian footballer

== See also ==
- Cerradomys marinhus, a species of rodent known as the Marinho rice rat or Marinho's oryzomys
- Marino (disambiguation)
- Mariño
