= San Marino (disambiguation) =

The Republic of San Marino is a European country completely surrounded by Italy.

San Marino may also refer to:

- Saint Marinus, the founder of the state of San Marino
- City of San Marino, the capital city of the Republic of San Marino
- San Marino (river), a river in the Italian peninsula
- Autodromo Enzo e Dino Ferrari, the circuit that hosted the San Marino Grands Prix
- San Marino, California, a city in Los Angeles County, United States
- ASD Victor San Marino, a football club in the Republic of San Marino that plays in the Italian Serie D
- The San Marino national football team
- San Marino, Croatia, a hamlet and a ferry port on the island of Rab
- San Marino Brand, a Philippine canned seafood brand manufactured by CDO Foodsphere

== See also ==
- Dan Marino
- Marino (disambiguation)
