= Marino =

Marino, Mariño or Maryino may refer to:

== Places ==
- Marino, Lazio, a town in the province of Rome, Italy
- Marino, South Australia, a suburb of Adelaide
  - Marino Conservation Park, a protected area in South Africa
  - Marino Rocks Greenway, a cycling route
  - Marino Rocks railway station, a station in Adelaide, South Australia
- Marino, County Down in Northern Ireland
- Marino railway station (Northern Ireland) in County Down, Northern Ireland
- Marino railway station, Adelaide in Adelaide, South Australia
- Marino, Dublin, a suburb of Dublin, Ireland
- Marino, Ilinden, North Macedonia, a village
- Maryino District of Moscow, Russia
- Maryino (Moscow Metro), a station of the Moscow Metro

== Name ==
- Marino (name), including people with the surname and given name
- Marino, a thief in the video game Mega Man X: Command Mission
- Marino, a comic book hero from Éditions Lug
- Marino, a surname of Saint Marina the Monk

== Sports ==
- A.S.D. Città di Marino Calcio or simply Marino, an Italian association football team
- CD Marino, a football team in the Canary Islands, Spain
- Marino de Luanco, a football team in Asturias, Spain
- Yokohama Marinos, a Japanese football team which merged with the Yokohama Flügels to form the Yokohama F. Marinos

== Other uses ==
- Marino language, a language of Vanuatu also known as Sungwadia
- Marino dialect, a dialect spoken in Marino, Lazio.
- Marino DOC, an Italian wine
- El Marino, a Chilean newspaper
- Palazzo Marino, a 16th-century palace in Milan, Italy
- "Marino", a season 2 episode from Servant (TV series)

== See also ==
- Toyota Sprinter Marino, a version of the Toyota Corolla car
- San Marino (disambiguation)
- Mariño
- Marinho
- Merino (disambiguation)
