= Merino (disambiguation) =

Merino is an economically influential breed of sheep prized for its wool.

Merino may also refer to:

== Places ==
- Merino, Colorado, United States
- Irvington, Kentucky, United States, formerly known as Merino
- Mount Merino, Kentucky, United States, near Irvington
- Merino, Victoria, Australia
- Merinos, Uruguay

== Other uses ==
- Merino (surname), including a list of people with the name
- English Merino, a guinea pig breed
- The Big Merino, a 15-metre tall concrete merino sheep located in Goulburn, New South Wales, Australia

== See also ==
- Marino (disambiguation)
- Merindad, a medieval Spanish municipality run by a merino
