= Merini =

Merini is an Italian surname. Notable people with the surname include:

- Alda Merini (1931–2009), Italian writer and poet
- Matteo Merini (born 1988), Italian footballer

== See also ==
- Merino (surname)
