= Military career of Simón Bolívar =

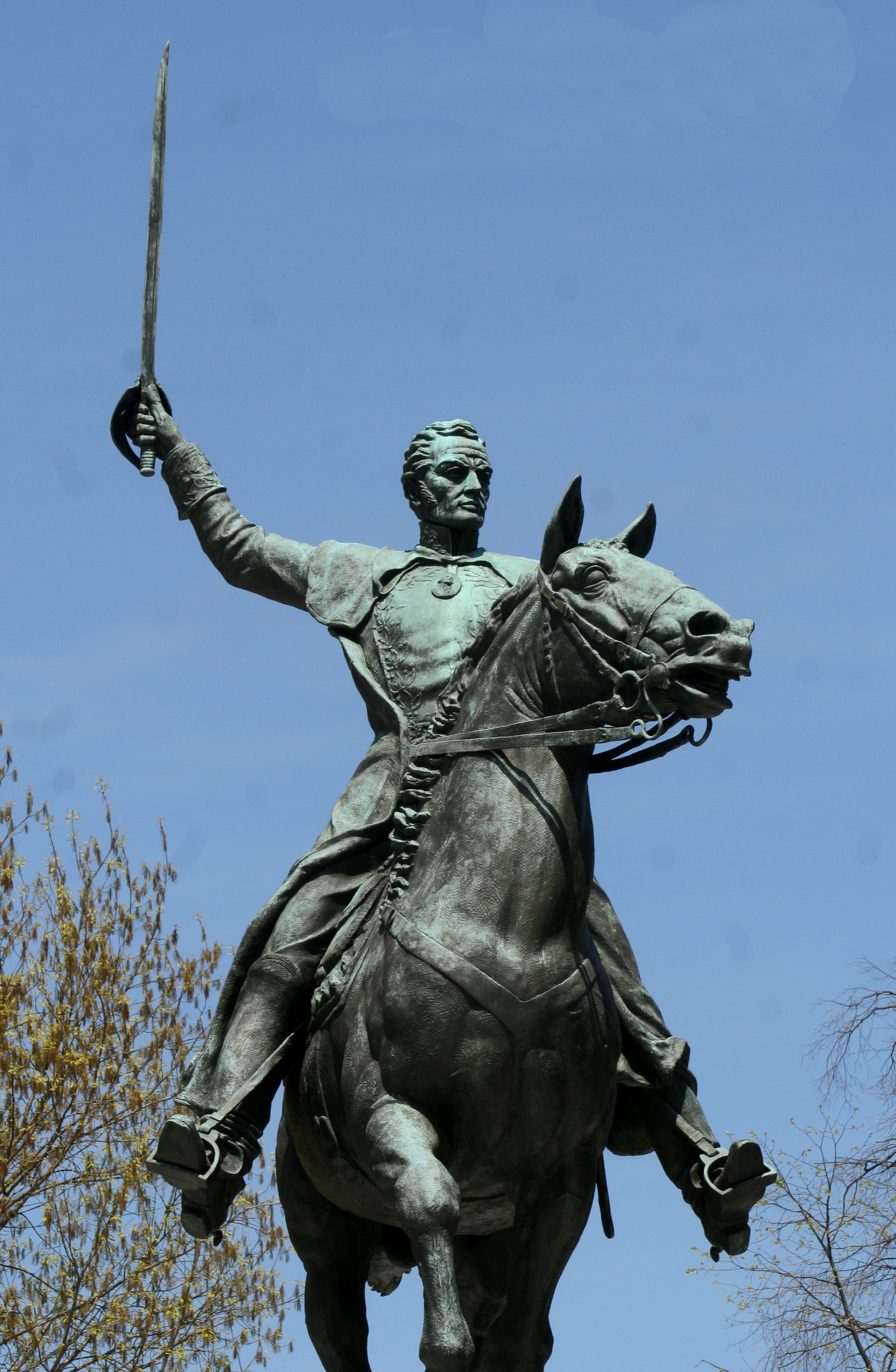
Equestrian statue of Simón Bolívar

The military and political career of Simón Bolívar (July 24, 1783 – December 17, 1830), which included both formal service in the armies of various revolutionary regimes and actions organized by himself or in collaboration with other exile patriot leaders during the years from 1811 to 1830, was an important element in the success of the independence wars in South America. Given the unstable political climate during these years, Bolívar and other patriot leaders, such as Santiago Mariño, Manuel Piar, José Francisco Bermúdez, and Francisco de Paula Santander often had to go into exile in the Caribbean or nearby areas of Spanish America that at the moment were controlled by those favoring independence, and from there, carry on the struggle. These wars resulted in the creation of several South American states out of the former Spanish colonies, the currently existing Venezuela, Colombia, Ecuador, Peru, and Bolivia, and the now defunct Gran Colombia.

In his 30-year career, Bolívar faced two main challenges. First was gaining acceptance as undisputed leader of the republican cause. Despite claiming such a role since 1813, he began to achieve this only in 1817, and consolidated his hold on power after his dramatic and unexpected victory in New Granada in 1819. His second challenge was implementing a vision of unifying the region into one large state, which he believed would be the only guarantee of maintaining American independence from the Spanish in northern South America. His early experiences under the First Venezuelan Republic and in New Granada convinced him that divisions among republicans, augmented by federal forms of government, only allowed Spanish American royalists to eventually gain the upper hand. Once again, it was his victory in 1819 that gave him the leverage to bring about the creation of a unified state, Gran Colombia, with which to oppose the Spanish Monarchy on the continent.

== Historical background ==
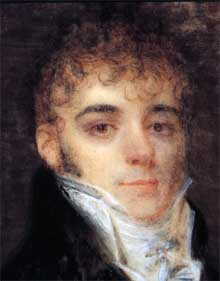
Miniature portrait of Bolívar at about age 21 made in Paris, circa 1804.

The idea of independence for Spanish America had existed for several years among a minority of the residents of northern South America. In 1797, the Venezuelans Manuel Gual and José María España, inspired by exiled Spaniard Juan Bautista Picornell, unsuccessfully attempted to establish a republic in Venezuela with greater social equality for Venezuelans of all racial and social backgrounds. Nine years later, in 1806, long-time Venezuelan expatriate Francisco de Miranda led a small group of mostly British and American foreign volunteers in an attempt to take over Venezuela and set up an independent republic. Like Gual and España's conspiracy, Miranda's putsch failed to attract Venezuelans of any social and economic class, in fact local Venezuelans organized the resistance to Miranda's invasion and quickly dispersed it. The lack of interest on the part of the Venezuelan Criollos is often explained by their fear that the loss of the removal of Spanish control might bring about a revolution that would destroy their own power in Venezuela. Nevertheless, in the decades leading up to 1806, Criollos had often been at odds with the Spanish Crown: they wanted an expansion of the free trade that was benefiting their plantation economy and objected to the Crown's new policy of granting social privileges that had been traditionally been reserved for whites (españoles) to Pardos through the purchase of certificates of whiteness (gracias al sacar). So the Criollos' failure to support Gual, España, and Miranda, which would have created a state under their control, needs to also be understood by the fact that a national identity separate from the Spaniards had not yet emerged among them.

In neighboring New Granada, tensions also existed with the Crown but had not evolved into an outright desire for separation. In 1779, the Revolt of the Comuneros pitted middle-class and rural residents against the royal authorities over the issue of new taxes instituted as part of the Bourbon Reforms. Although the revolt was stopped and the leaders punished or executed, the uprising did manage to slow down the economic reforms that the Crown had planned for New Granada. In the subsequent decades, a few New Granadans, like Antonio Nariño, became intrigued by the ideas of the French Revolution and attempted to promote its values by disseminating translated documents like the Declaration of the Rights of Man and of the Citizen. Again, this was a minority and not necessarily a sign that the majority in New Granada did not see themselves as members of the Spanish Monarchy.

The break with the Crown came in 1808 with the disappearance of a stable government in Spain. The crisis was precipitated by Napoleon's removal of the Bourbon dynasty from the throne of Spain (he convinced Ferdinand VII to abdicate, and his father Charles IV to renounce any claim to returning to the throne he had abdicated only months earlier) and his invasion of Spain. As the entire Spanish world rejected the new Bonaparte Dynasty (Napoleon gave the crown of Spain to his brother, the King of Naples and Sicily), Spain itself fell into chaos and it took almost a year for a coordinated, centralized provisional government (the Supreme Central and Governmental Junta of Spain and the Indies) to form. Even then, the rapid and large French advances in the Peninsula seemed to make the idea of a stable government in Spain pointless. By 1810, the Supreme Junta was cornered in the island city of Cadiz during the two-year Siege of Cádiz. Throughout Spanish America, people felt it was time to take the government into their own hands, if a Spanish world, independent of the French, were to continue to exist at all, and therefore in 1810 juntas were set up throughout the Americas, including in Caracas and Bogotá, just as they had been in Spain two years earlier.

== Service under the First Republic (1810–1812) ==
In 1809 a twenty-six-year-old Bolívar had retreated to his estate in the Valleys of Aragua, refusing to openly participate in calls for the establishment of a Venezuelan junta, because the plans did not consider the option of independence. He was still in his country estates when a junta was successfully established on April 19, 1810. The new Junta of Caracas chose him to be part of a delegation to the United Kingdom to seek British aid. The delegation did not have much success, but Bolívar did return in December 1810 with Francisco de Miranda, who saw an opportunity in the political turmoil to return to Venezuela.

=== Independence declared ===
Civil war broke out between the provinces of Venezuela that recognized the Caracas Junta and those that still recognized the Regency in Spain (the Cortes of Cádiz), that had replaced the Supreme Central Junta. The situation became more tense when a congress, called by the Caracas Junta, declared independence on July 5, 1811, sparking rebellions in Valencia in favor of the Cortes of Cádiz. Bolívar's first military service was as an officer under Miranda's command in the units created to put down this revolt. Bolívar was promoted to colonel and made commandant of Puerto Cabello the following year. At the same time that Frigate Captain Domingo de Monteverde was making fast and vast advances into republican territory from the west (his forces had entered Valencia on May 3, 1812), Bolívar lost control of San Felipe Castle along with its ammunition stores on June 30, when the royalist prisoners held there managed to take it over and attack the small number of troops in the city. Deciding that the situation was lost, Bolívar effectively abandoned his post and retreated to his estate farm in San Mateo. Miranda also saw the republican cause as lost and authorized a capitulation with Monteverde on July 25.

=== The royalist restoration ===
The terms of the Capitulation of San Mateo, which Monteverde approved but which Miranda never came to sign, granted amnesty and the right to emigrate from Venezuela to all republicans, if they chose to do so. Nevertheless, there was great confusion among the republicans as to what the treaty actually contained or if Monteverde would keep his word. It was in this uncertain environment that Miranda chose to abandon the country before Monteverde occupied Caracas. In the early morning of August 1, Miranda was sleeping in the house of the commandant of La Guaira, Colonel Manuel María Casas, when he was awakened by Casas, Bolívar, Miguel Peña and four other soldiers, who promptly arrested Miranda for treason to the Republic and turned him over to Monteverde. For his apparent services to the royalist cause, Monteverde granted Bolívar a passport, and Bolívar left for Curaçao on August 27.

== Exile and the Second Republic (1812–1814) ==
In Curaçao Bolívar learned that Monteverde had broken the promises given in the Capitulation of San Mateo. Many of the republicans who had stayed behind were arrested and the property of many republicans, both in Venezuela and in exile, were confiscated to make up for the large deficits the government faced. Bolívar decided to rejoin the patriot cause and made his way to Cartagena de Indias, which had established itself as an independent republic on November 11, 1811 (in reaction as much to events in Spain as to attempts by the junta in Bogotá to control it) and joined a few days later in a confederation with four other provinces, the United Provinces of New Granada. In the weeks before arriving in Cartagena in October 1812, Bolívar began to analyze the collapse of the Venezuelan republic and published his thoughts in December in his Cartagena Manifesto. In the document Bolívar blamed the failure on the federal nature of the Venezuelan republic, which had allowed provinces to ignore the needs of other provinces threatened by Monteverde's advance, and the intransigence of the Venezuelan population to the republican cause, among other things. He saw the Venezuelan case as a warning to the divided New Granada and urged it to retake Caracas from the royalists. He enlisted as an officer in the army of the New Granadan Union and led forces in the Magdalena Campaign against cities in the lower Magdalena River that had refused to accept Cartagena's authority or that of the Union, and then attacked Ocaña. His success in these operations convinced the congress of the Union to authorize his plans to invade Venezuela in May 1813, and thus began his Admirable Campaign.

His reentry into Venezuela marked a new, more violent phase of the wars of independence. Monteverde's troops had already carried out atrocities: he had allowed his soldiers to loot many of the cities he occupied and several of his commanders became notorious for torturing and killing civilians suspected of collaborating with the Republic. Bolívar also faced the fact that by 1813 much of the older aristocrats, who had led the republic, had abandoned the cause of independence, and the general population had turned against republicanism even before its collapse. In order to drive a wedge between Venezuelans and Peninsulares, Bolívar's instituted a policy of no quarter in his Decree of War to the Death, in which he promised to kill any Peninsular who did not actively support his efforts to restore independence and to spare any American even if they actively collaborated with Monteverde or the royalists.

=== The Republic restored and lost ===
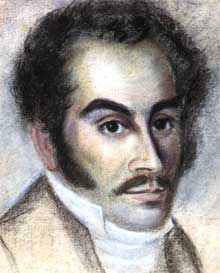
Portrait of Bolívar made in Haiti in 1816.

Bolívar's push towards Caracas was aided by the fact that the general population, which had welcomed Monteverde a year earlier, had become disillusioned by his failure to implement the terms of the San Mateo Capitulation or the Spanish Constitution of 1812, which the capitulation promised. Monteverde also faced attacks on two fronts, since Santiago Mariño had already opened a front on the east in January 1813. Bolívar's forces easily defeated the overtaxed and underpaid royalist army in a series of battles, entered Caracas on August 6, 1813, and laid siege to Monteverde, who had retreated to Puerto Cabello. In Caracas Bolívar announced the restoration of the Venezuelan Republic, but placed himself at the head of a military government, since the situation did not allow for the restoration of the old authorities or new elections. Bolívar would base his subsequent and enduring claim to be the sole head of the Venezuelan republic and commander-in-chief of its forces on this accomplishment, although even at this time he was not universally acknowledged as head of the state or the republican forces. Mariño, based in Cumaná, did not recognize Bolívar's claim, but did collaborate with him militarily. Reprisals were carried out against Peninsular royalists that were captured. It was during this period that the republican city fathers of Caracas, following the example of Mérida, granted Bolívar the title of Liberator and office of captain general in the Church of San Francisco (the more appropriate site, the Cathedral of Caracas, was still damaged from the 1812 earthquake).

Bolívar and Mariño's success, like Monteverde's a year earlier, was short-lived. The new Republic failed to convince the common people that it was not a tool of the urban elite. Lower-class people, especially the southern, rural llaneros (cowboys), flocked to the royalist cause. Llaneros played a key military role in the region's struggle. Turning the tide against independence, these highly mobile, ferocious fighters made up a formidable military force that pushed Bolívar out of his home country once more. By 1814, the regular royalist army headed by Governor and Captain General Juan Manuel Cajigal was overshadowed by a large, irregular force of llaneros recruited and led by José Tomás Boves. With the royalist irregulars displaying the same passion and violence that Bolívar had demonstrated in his "war to the death" decree, the republicans suffered their first major setback at the Battle of La Puerta on June 15, 1814, and Boves took Caracas on July 16. The republicans and Criollo royalists in Caracas, who also feared Boves's llanero hoards, had to flee en masse to Mariño's strongholds in the east. The combined forces of Mariño's and Bolívar were defeated again at the Battle of Aragua de Barcelona on August 18, at a cost of 2,000 royalist casualties of the 10,000 troops they fielded, most of the 3,000 combatants in the republican army, in addition to many civilian casualties. Due to their series of repeated reverses both Bolívar and Mariño were arrested and removed from power by José Félix Ribas and Manuel Piar, each representing the two republican commands then in place in Venezuela. A few days later Ribas and Piar decided not to try them and instead released them into exile. On September 8, Bolívar and Mariño set sail for Cartagena de Indias, leaving Piar and Ribas to lead the increasingly encircled republicans.

=== Royalist control consolidated ===
Earlier in March 1814, Ferdinand VII had returned to the throne. The Sixth Coalition's advances made it impossible for Napoleon to continue holding Ferdinand or fighting in Spain. Once in Spain, however, Ferdinand was not pleased by the revolution in government that had been undertaken in his name, and by May he had abolished the Spanish Constitution of 1812 and began persecuting and arresting the liberals responsible for its creation. To deal with the Americas, Ferdinand organized the largest expeditionary force that Spain ever sent to the Americas up to that time. Colonel Pablo Morillo, a veteran of the Spanish struggle against the French was chosen as its commander. The expeditionary force was made up of approximately 10,000 men and nearly sixty ships. Originally, they were to head for Montevideo in the Viceroyalty of the Río de la Plata, another region that had fallen out of royalist control, but soon it was decided to send these forces to the Venezuela and New Granada, where the war had become exceedingly savage. Realizing that this change in plans would not go over well with the soldiers, the news was kept from them until they were at sea. When the expeditionary force arrived in Venezuela, it found that most of it had been restored to royalist control, save for Margarita Island, which surrendered to it with no blood shed. With Venezuela pacified, plans were quickly made to subdue neighboring New Granada, and the bulk of the troops moved to the coastal city of Santa Marta, which had remained in royalist hands since 1810.

== Second exile in New Granada and the Caribbean (1814–1816) ==
Like many other Venezuelan republicans who fled to New Granada after the second wave of royalist victories, Bolívar once again entered into the service of the United Provinces and fought against cities that had refused to acknowledge its authority. His forces took Bogotá on December 12, 1814, after an eight-month-long war, and was promoted to captain general for his efforts. He was then given the task of capturing the royalist stronghold, Santa Marta, but Cartagena, the obvious base from which to launch this offensive, refused to give him the necessary soldiers and supplies, so infighting broke out. As Santa Martan forces gained ground against the divided republicans in northern New Granada, Bolívar left for Jamaica on May 8, 1815. Cartagena would fall to Morillo in December 1815 and Bogotá in May of the following year.

=== Aid from the Haitian Republic and Curaçao ===
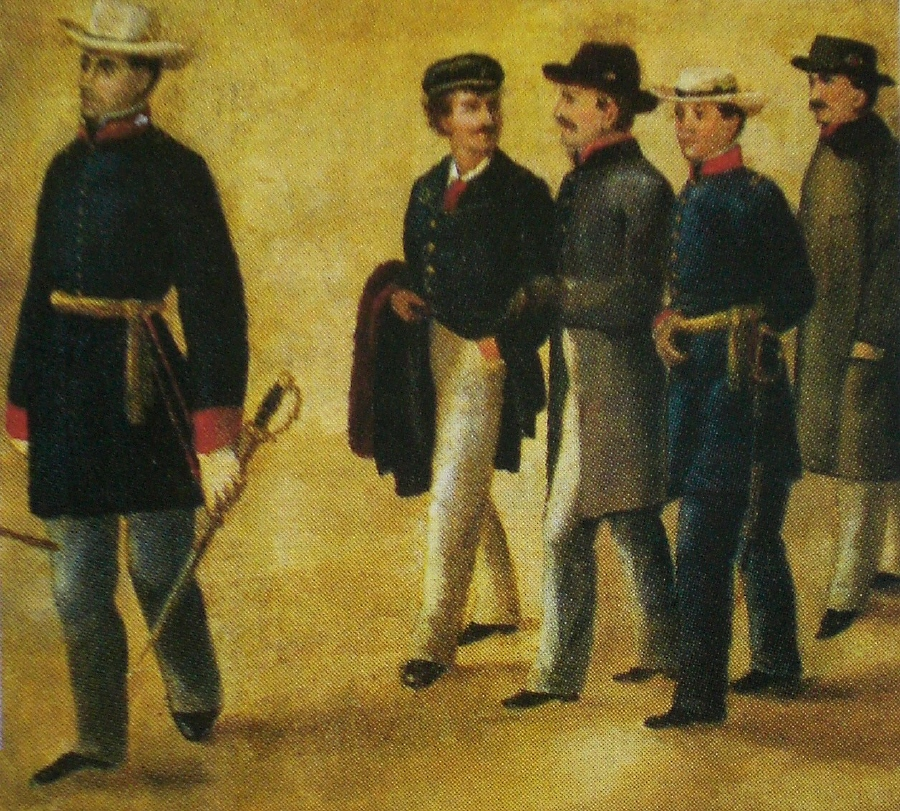
Soublette, Pedro Briceño Méndez, Francisco Antonio Zea, Gregor MacGregor and Brión in Ocumare. 19th-century illustration by Carmelo Fernández.

Now thirty-two years of age, he found himself in exile for the second time. In Jamaica, Bolívar once again issued a manifesto explaining his view of the failure of the republican cause in Venezuela. His famous Letter from Jamaica, though ostensibly written to one man, was an appeal to Great Britain specifically and the European powers in general to aid the cause of Spanish American independence, but it found no significant response. So he turned to the small and isolated republic of Haiti, that had freed itself from French rule, but being composed of mostly former slaves, received little aid from either the United States or Europe. Bolívar and other Venezuelan and New Granadan exiles were warmly received by the Haitian president Alexandre Pétion. The growing exile community would receive money, volunteers and weapons from the Haitian president enabling them to resume plans to continue the struggle for independence. There was debate, however, over who should be in charge, but his ability to win over Pétion and a Curaçaoan sea merchant, Luis Brión (he is traditionally referred to by the Spanish form of his name), who had just acquired a much-needed warship in England to aid the embattled Cartagenan Republic, forced the other Venezuelan leaders to grudgingly accept his leadership. Pétion, for his part, convinced Bolívar to expand the fight for independence to include the liberation of slaves.

The émigrés successfully captured a beachhead at Los Cayos on March 31, 1816. Bolívar proclaimed the restoration of the Venezuelan Republic and in two decrees of June 2 and July 16 declared the freedom of slaves conditional on their joining the republican forces. Shortly thereafter, Margarita Island, safely separated by water from Morillo's forces, rejoined the republican cause and became a second base of operations. Operating under the command of Mariño, Piar and Carlos Soublette the republican expeditionaries captured more coastal towns. On July 14 Bolívar led an assault against Ocumare de la Costa, which ended in a debacle in which Bolívar abandoned Mariño, Piar and the rest of his forces, and fled by sea. Piar's forces managed to fight their way from the Caribbean coast to the southern Llanos, where the vast and underpopulated terrain and the forces forming under José Antonio Páez protected them from the royalist army. Mariño retreated to his home province of Cumaná, where he could rely on personal connections to maintain a base of operations. After failing to find support along the coast, Bolívar returned to Haiti. In the intervening months the divided republican leaders unable to agree on a single leader, decided to compromise and in October offered Bolívar the military command, with the understanding that a separate civilian government would be formed. In Haiti Bolívar gathered new supplies and organized a second expedition, named by history as the Jacmel Expedition for the city from which it departed, and on December 31, 1816, landed in Barcelona controlled by Mariño, who by this point barely accepted Bolívar as head of the republicans.

== The Third Republic (1817–1820) ==
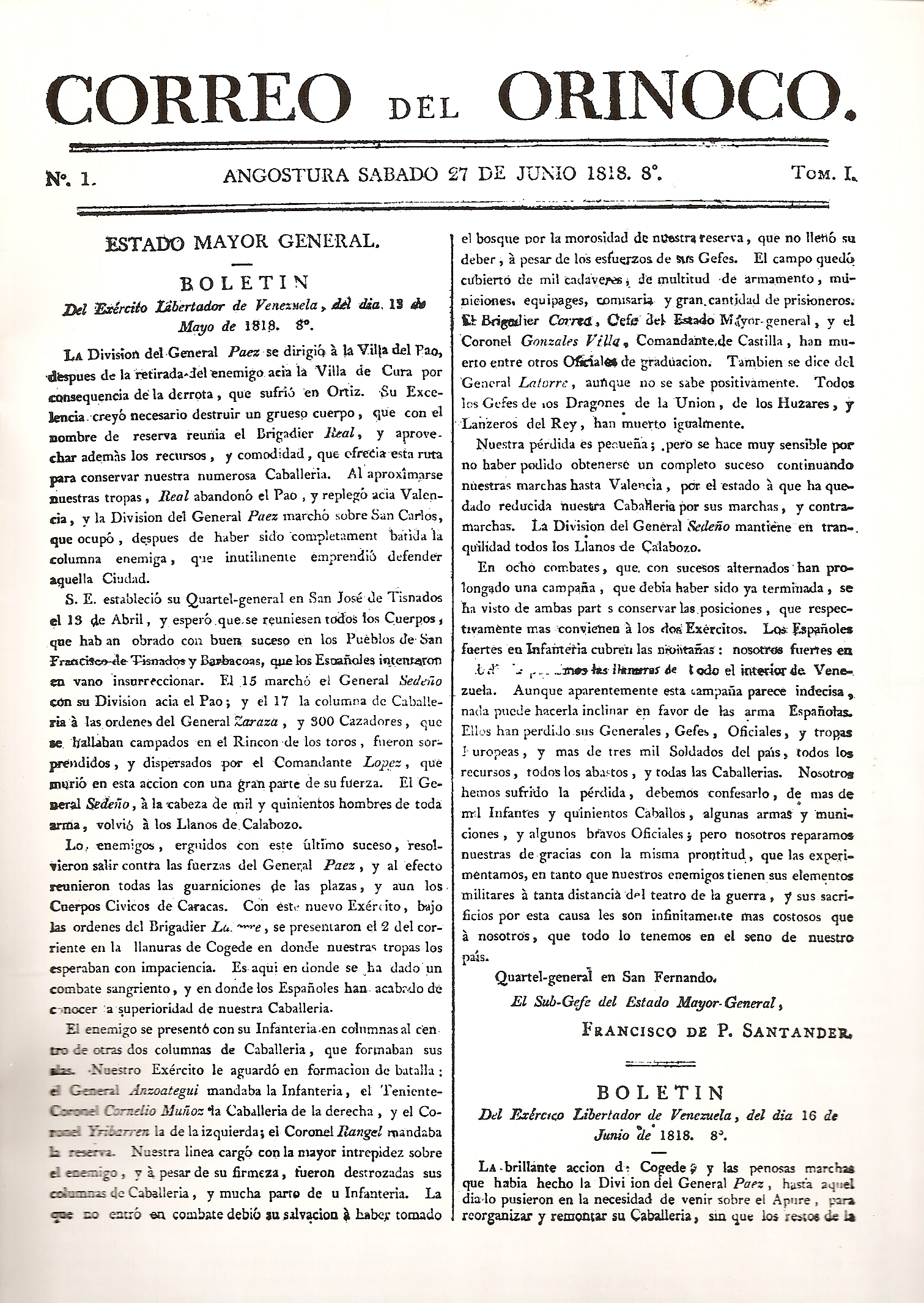
First issue of the Correo del Orinoco, June 27, 1818.

Bolívar took the forces he brought from Haiti to the Orinoco region, which was mostly controlled by Piar. Piar was making headway against the royalists of Angostura, and was preparing to lay siege to the city. The siege proved difficult and long, since Angostura had a lifeline in the river itself. Bolívar's reinforcements were useful and the city fell in August 1817. Angostura proved to be an immensely valuable base. From it the republicans had access to foreign trade in Caribbean and beyond via the Orinoco. The river's tributaries also provided access to the Venezuelan and New Granadan Llanos to the west, especially those in Casanare, where refugees from Morillo's troops had organized themselves under Francisco de Paula Santander. In Angostura Bolívar began publishing the Correo del Orinoco newspaper, an official organ of the revolutionaries, which was circulated not only in Venezuela, but in the Caribbean and in Europe. Under Páez and Piar, the republican armies had begun to recruit the local llaneros who, after Morillo disbanded Boves's informal units, no longer had an outlet for quick enrichment and social advancement under the royalist banner. This, however, posed the challenge to the Criollo republican leaders of channeling the llanero's energy, while not re-igniting the race war that had occurred under Boves. In this environment leaders like Piar, who in recent years had begun to emphasize his Pardo roots as he built a Pardo and llanero following, became suspect, and this weakness proved useful to Bolívar, when the moment came to reassert his position as head of the nascent republic.

=== Challenges to Bolívar's authority ===
The first overt challenge to his rule came with the meeting of the "Congresillo of Cariaco" on May 8 and 9 under the auspices of Canon José Cortés de Madariaga—who had been a member of the Junta of Caracas and had just returned to Venezuela after being imprisoned in Spain—Luis Brión and Santiago Mariño. The eight-member Congress proposed to restore the 1811 Constitution and establish a permanent government that could negotiate a recognition by other nations. Mariño offered his and Bolívar's resignation in order to allow the Congress to elect a new executive. The Congress restored the triumvirate and selected Fernando Rodríguez del Toro (who was at the moment exiled in Trinidad), Francisco Javier Mayz (one of the eight deputies of the Congress) and Simón Bolívar as the new triumvirate. To replace in an interim manner the two who were not present, the Congress chose Francisco Antonio Zea and Canon Cortés de Madariaga. It made Mariño general-in-chief of the republican forces and established La Asunción as the temporary capital of the Republic. It sent word to Bolívar to present himself as soon as military conditions permitted to take his place in the triumvirate. Less than a month later, Rafael Urdaneta and Antonio José de Sucre, who remained loyal to Bolívar, lead a group of officers that forced the triumvirate to dissolve itself. By June, Bolívar, aware of its rise and fall, compared its existence to "cassava bread in hot soup" and noted that at the moment in Venezuela only those who could command by force could truly do so.

It was clear to Bolívar by mid-1817 that he need to set a clear example that he would not tolerate challenges to his leadership. After the fall of Angostura Piar had become upset at Bolívar's leadership and decided to leave the area. He requested a passport from Bolívar, which he granted. Piar had begun to leave the area, when Bolívar changed his mind and accused Piar of plotting to kill all whites in the area and setting up a black and Mulatto republic (a pardocracia) in imitation of Haiti. Piar was tracked down, court-martialed and found guilty. On October 16 he was executed. Although Piar's crime had ostensibly been fomenting racial hatred, it was understood that his true crime had been not recognizing Bolívar authority. After Piar's execution, Mariño, whom Bolívar's confidant and chronicler Daniel Florencio O'Leary later admitted had been more guilty of insubordination than Piar, fell in line and dropped any other pretensions to an independent leadership.

His political position secured, Bolívar began to expand the scope of his military activity. He met with Páez for the first time in January 1818, who accepted Bolívar as head of the republicans. Páez, however, refused to take his powerful llanero cavalry outside of the Llanos, where they were extremely effective in holding off and defeating Morillo's formal army. Bolívar was, therefore, left alone in a mid-year attempt to take Caracas, which failed. Nevertheless, by the end of the year, the republicans were secure enough in southern Venezuela, that Bolívar felt it was time to convene a new Venezuelan congress to give the republican government a permanent form. Elections were held in republican areas and to pick representatives of the provinces of Venezuela and New Granada under royalist control, among the troops of those areas. The Congress of Angostura, consisting of twenty-six delegates, began holding sessions in February 1819. The highlight of the opening session was Bolívar's "Address at the Congress of Angostura", now seen along with his "Cartagena Manifesto" and "Jamaica Letter" as a foundational exposition of his political thought. The same day the Congress elected Bolívar president of the Republic and ratified his command of its armies.

=== The New Granada campaign ===
After the opening of the Congress, Bolívar conceived of a daring, yet risky, plan of attacking New Granada which had been a Spanish stronghold for the past three years. If he could liberate New Granada he would have a whole new base from which to operate against Morillo. Central New Granada held great promise since, unlike Venezuela, it had only been recently conquered by Morillo and it had a prior six-year experience of independent government. Royalist sentiment was not strong. But it would be hard to take the initiative against the better prepared and supplied royalist army. To surprise it, Bolívar decided to move during the Venezuelan invierno, the rainy season, when the Llanos flooded up to a meter and the campaign season ended. Morillo's forces would be evacuated from the Llanos for months and no one would anticipate that Bolívar's troops would be on the move. This decision, however, would mean literally wading in waist-deep, malarial water for days before attempting to scale the Andes. Understandably the plan received little support from the Congress or even from the master of the Llanos himself, Páez. With only the forces he and Santander had recruited in the Apure and Meta River regions, Bolívar set off in June 1819.

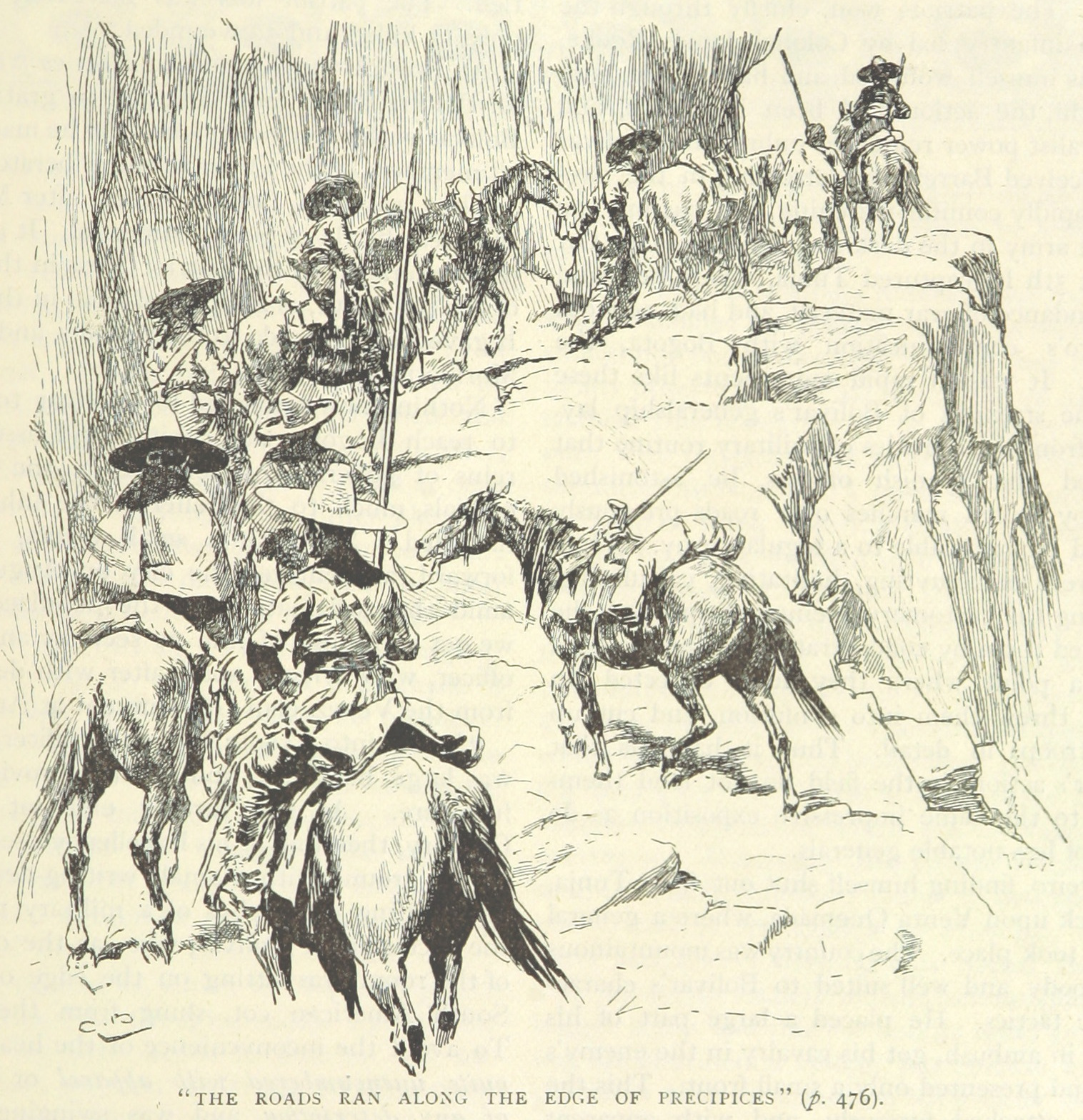
Bolívar's troops cross the Cordillera Oriental

The small army consisted of about 2,500 men: 1,300 infantry and 800 cavalry, including a British legion. It took a route that went from the hot and humid, flood-swept plains of Colombia to the icy mountain pass of the Páramo de Pisba, at an altitude of 3,960 meters (13,000 feet), through the Cordillera Oriental. After the hardships of wading through a virtual sea, the mostly llanero army scaled the mountains poorly clothed and ill-prepared for the cold and altitude of the mountains. On both legs of the trip many became ill or died. Despite some intelligence that Bolívar was on the move, the Spanish considered the route impassable, and therefore, they were taken by surprise when Bolívar's small army emerged from the mountains on July 5. In a series of battles under the auspices of Francisco Mariño y Soler the republican army cleared its way to Bogotá. First at the Battle of Vargas Swamp on July 25, Bolívar intercepted a royalist force attempting to reach the poorly defended capital. Then at the Battle of Boyacá on August 7, the bulk of the royalist army surrendered to Bolívar. On receiving the news, the viceroy, Juan José de Sámano, and the rest of royalist government fled the capital so fast that they left behind the treasury, an incredible coup for Bolívar and Santander. On August 10 Bolívar's army entered Bogotá.

With New Granada secure under Santander's control, Bolívar could return to Venezuela in a position of unprecedented military, political and financial strength. In his absence the Congress had flirted with deposing him, assuming that he would meet his death in New Granada. The vice-president Francisco Antonio Zea was deposed and replaced by Juan Bautista Arismendi. All this was quickly reversed when word got to the Congress of Bolívar's success. By year's end Bolívar presented himself before the Congress and asked it to decree the union of Venezuela and New Granada in a new state, Colombia. It did so on December 17 and elected him president of the new country. The Constitution that the Congress had just written for Venezuela became null and void and a new congress was set to convene within two years.

== President and Commander-in-Chief of Gran Colombia (1820–1825) ==
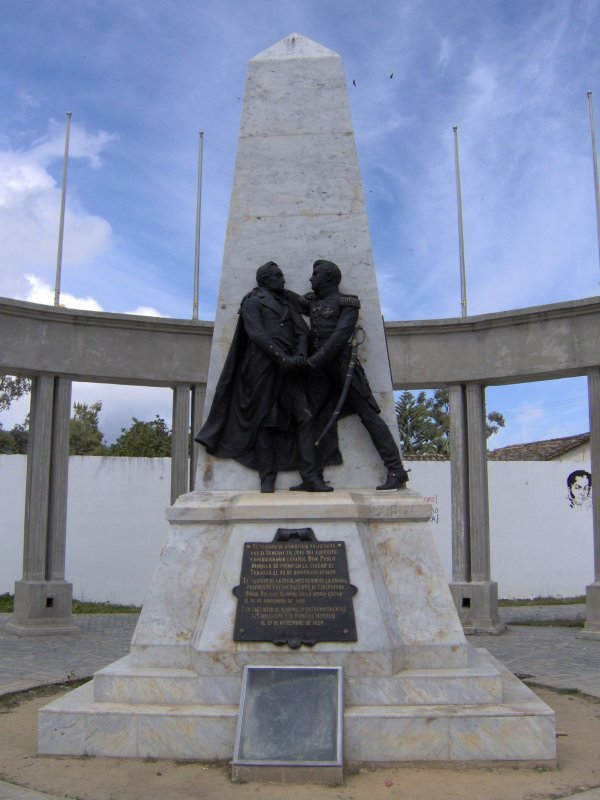
Monument to the meeting between Morillo and Bolívar in Santa Ana de Trujillo.

1820 proved to be a banner year for Bolívar. His dream of creating a new nation was becoming a reality. Morillo no longer had the upper hand militarily and by late March reports began to arrive about the success of the Riego Revolt. The revolt meant that the reinforcements that Morillo's expeditionary force desperately needed would not be coming. Moreover, in June the official orders to reinstate the Cádiz Constitution arrived and were implemented. The new Constitutional government in Spain radically changed policy towards the rebellions in America. It assumed that the revolutionaries, as liberals, were either fighting for, or could be co-opted by, the Spanish Constitution. Although this might have been true in parts of Spanish America at the start of the decade, by 1820 most Spanish Americans did not trust Fernando VII to keep his oath to the Constitution for long. More importantly, it had always been Bolívar's stance that the wars were between two sovereign states, and therefore, the question of reconciling with the Spanish Monarchy under the 1812 Constitution was never a consideration.

Despite this, Morillo continued with negotiations and focused on getting a ceasefire and bringing the war in line with the law of nations. This was achieved in two treaties signed on November 25 and 26 in Santa Ana de Trujillo, which established a six-month cessation of hostilities and regularized the rules of engagement. The negotiations were also important because the Spanish government for the first time tacitly granted Colombia national status, rather than seeing its representatives as mere rebels. Spain did not of course recognize Colombia, but the negotiations papers referred to it as such, rather than with the previous denominations of "Bolívar's forces" or "the Congress at Angostura." The ceasefire allowed Bolívar to build up his army for the final showdown everyone knew was coming. By the end of the year, the Constitutional government granted Morillo his long-standing request to resign and he left South America. He was replaced by Miguel de la Torre.

=== Victory in Venezuela ===
The truce did not last all six months. On January 28, the cabildo of Maracaibo, which had been in secret negotiations with the republicans aided by native son Rafael Urdaneta, declared the province an independent republic, which chose to join Colombia. La Torre took this to be a violation of the truce, and although the republicans argued that Maracaibo had switched sides of its own volition, both sides began to prepare for renewed war. The fate of Venezuela was sealed, when Bolívar returned to Venezuela in April 1821, leading an army of 7,000 from New Granada. At the Battle of Carabobo on June 24, the Colombian forces decisively defeated the royalist forces, assuring control of Venezuela, save for Puerto Cabello and guaranteeing Venezuelan independence. Hostilities continued until the surrender of Puerto Cabello in 1823, but the main front of the war now moved to southern New Granada and Quito.

=== The Southern campaign, Quito, and Peru (1821–1824) ===
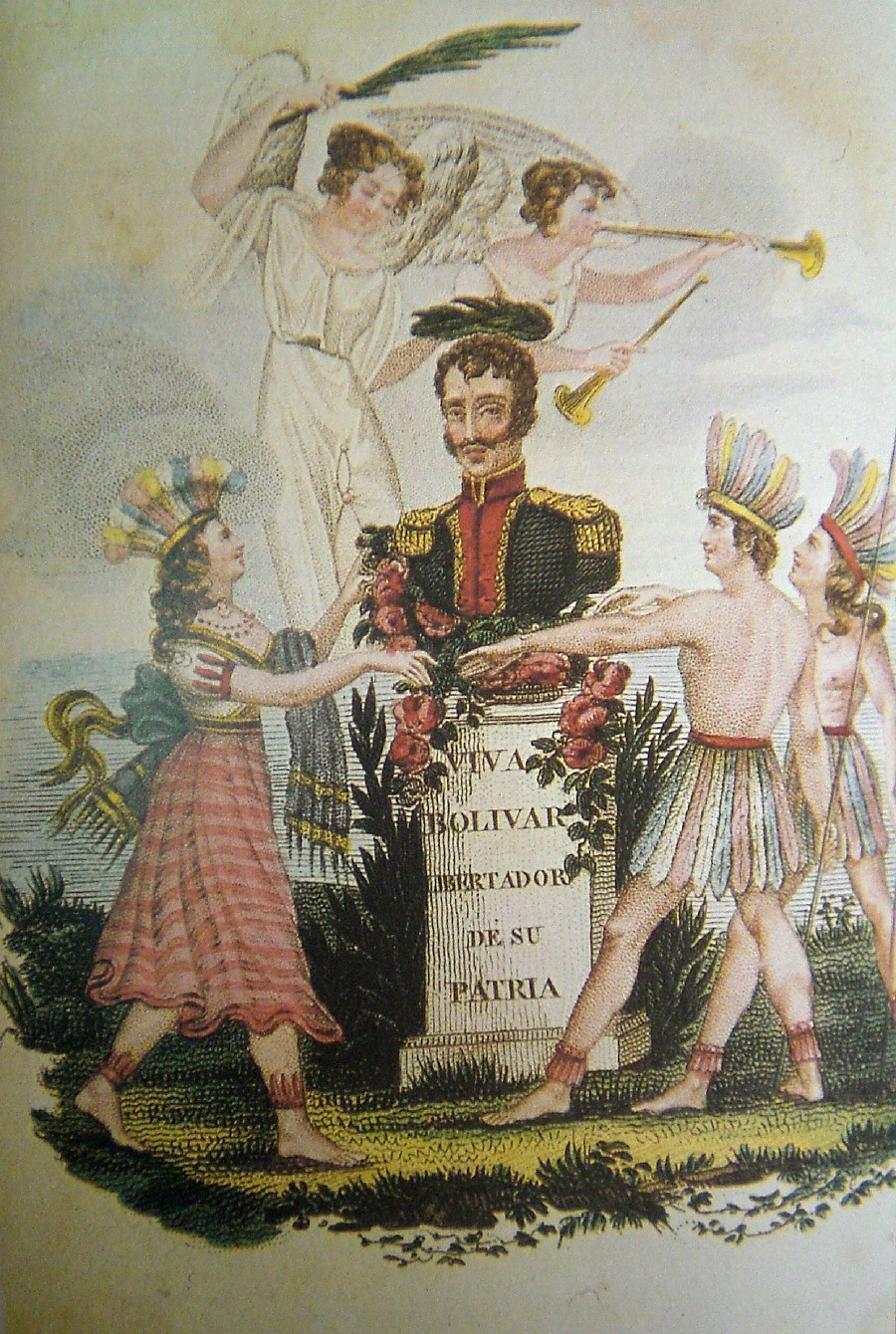
Allegory of Bolívar's liberation of Colombia in a book of poetry by José Joaquín de Olmedo.

With the Spanish Monarchy collapsing in South America and the uncertainty of constitutional rule in Spain, provinces of the Presidency of Quito began to declare independence. In October 1820 a coup in Guayaquil set up a junta, which declared Guayaquil a republic. Portoviejo and Cuenca followed suit in the next few weeks. Quito remained in royalist control under the Audiencia President, Field Marshal Melchor Aymerich, and by January 1821 had defeated the forces sent by Guayaquil against it. Bolívar was determined to ensure that the Presidency of Quito become part of Gran Colombia and not remain a collection of small, divided republics. To this end, Colombian aid in the form of supplies and an army under Antonio José de Sucre began to arrive in Guayaquil in February. Throughout 1821 Sucre was unable to take Quito, and by November both sides were exhausted and signed a 90-day armistice. The following year, at Battle of Pichincha on May 24, 1822, Sucre's Venezuelan forces finally conquered Quito. The territory of New Granada was secure. From Puerto Cabello royalist make a counterattack at Battle of Lake Maracaibo. However the main focus now became neutralizing the royalist Army in Peru.

José de San Martín had already made incursions into Peru starting in 1820. He had been declared Protector of Peruvian Freedom, in August 1821 after liberating parts of the country, but the important cities and provinces still remained royalist. Bolívar and San Martín held a meeting in Guayaquil on July 26 and 27, 1822, in which they discussed plans to liberate Peru and it was decided that Bolívar and Gran Colombia would take over the task of fully liberating Peru. San Martín departed from the scene. For the next two years Colombian and Peruvian patriot forces gain more territory. On February 10, 1824, Bolívar was given immense political powers when a Peruvian congress named him dictator of Peru, which made Bolívar the head of state of a second country and allowed Bolívar to completely reorganize the political and military administration of Peru. Bolívar, assisted by Sucre, decisively defeated the remnants of the royalist cavalry on August 6, 1824, at the Battle of Junín. Sucre then destroyed the still numerically superior remnants of the royalist army at Battle of Ayacucho on December 9. South American independence was now all but secured. The only royalist area in the continent was highland country of Upper Peru, El Callao and Chiloé.

=== The Peruvian and Colombian campaign in Upper Peru ===
Bolívar was now president of both Gran Colombia and Peru and had been granted extraordinary powers by the legislatures of both countries to carry out the war against the Spanish Monarchy. Since Bolívar was tied up with the administration of Quito and Peru, the liberation of Upper Peru fell to Sucre and O'Connor, and within a year in April 1825, the task had been completed. A congress of Upper Peru on August 6, 1825, chose to name the new nation after the Liberator and called it the Republic of Bolívar. (The name would later be changed to Bolivia.) With independence secured for all of Spanish South America, Bolívar's political life entered a new phase. He now had to turn to consolidating the large nations he had created out of the former Spanish provinces. And dissension began to brew in the north as the regions of Gran Colombia began to chafe under the centralized government.

== The dissolution of Gran Colombia and aftermath ==
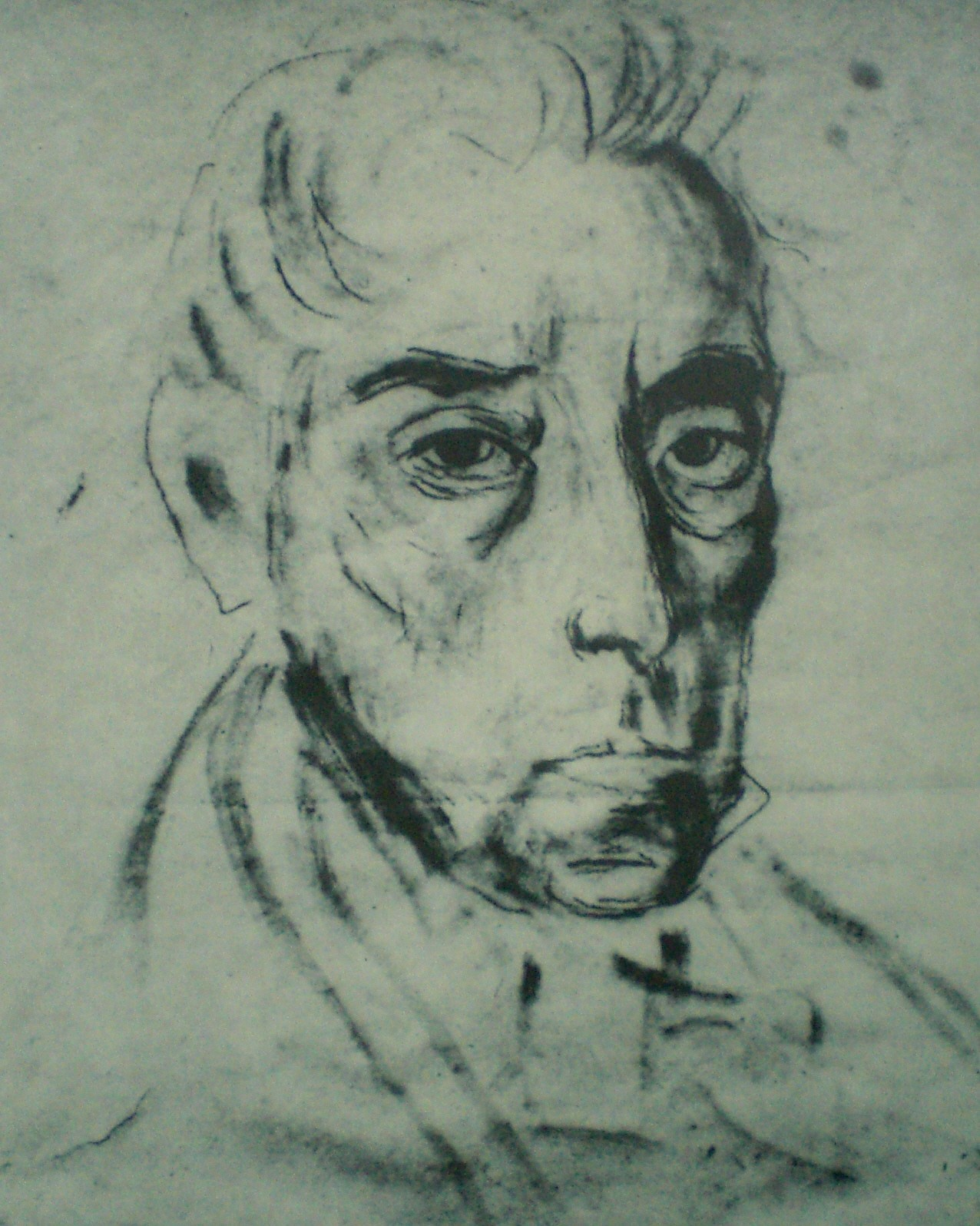
Sketch of Bolívar at age 47 made from life by José María Espinosa in 1830.

During 1826, internal divisions had sparked dissent throughout the nation and regional uprisings erupted in Venezuela, and Gran Colombia appeared to be on the verge of collapse. An amnesty was declared and an arrangement was reached with the Venezuelan rebels, but political dissent appeared in New Granada as a consequence of this. In an attempt to keep the nation together, Bolívar called for a constitutional convention at Ocaña to be held in April 1828. To prevent the splintering of Gran Colombia, Bolívar proposed to introduce an even more centralist model of government, including some or all of the elements he had been able to place in the Bolivian constitution: a lifetime presidency with the ability to select a successor, and a hereditary third chamber of the legislature. These proposals were deemed anti-liberal and met with strong opposition, including from a faction forming around Santander, who by now was openly opposed to Bolívar politically.

The Convention of Ocaña (April 9 to June 10, 1828) met under a cloud. Many felt that the breakup of the country was imminent. Addressing these fears, the Congress went in the opposite direction that Bolívar had hoped, and drafted a document which would have implemented a radically federalist form of government with greatly reduced the powers for the central administration. Unhappy with this outcome, pro-Bolívar delegates left the convention and the constitution was never ratified.

After the failure of the convention, Bolívar proclaimed himself dictator on August 27, 1828, through an Organic Decree of Dictatorship. He considered this as a temporary measure, as a means to reestablish his authority and save the republic, though it only increased dissatisfaction and anger among his political opponents. On September 25, 1828 an attempt to assassinate Bolívar failed, but it illustrated the tense political atmosphere in Gran Colombia. Although Bolívar emerged physically intact from the event, he was, nevertheless, greatly affected. Dissent continued, and new uprisings occurred in New Granada, Venezuela and Quito during the next two years. Gran Colombia finally collapsed in 1830. Bolívar himself died in the same year at age 47 on December 17. His closest political ally at the time, Sucre, who was intending to retire from public life, had been murdered earlier on June 4, 1830.

Bolívar's legacy continued in the successor states to Gran Colombia. Many of the officers who had fought by him were not only involved in the revolts that led to the dissolution of Gran Colombia, but continued to play important political and military roles in the decades and wars that followed. Bolívar's political thought—his emphasis on a strong, centralized government—became the basis of conservative thought in nineteenth-century South America.

== See also ==
- Libertadores
- Spanish American wars of independence
- Latin American integration
- Bolivian War of Independence

== Bibliography ==
- Lynch, John. The Spanish American Revolutions, 1808-1826 (Second edition). New York: W. W. Norton & Co., 1986. ISBN 0-393-95537-0
- Lynch, John. Simón Bolívar: A Life, Yale University Press, 2006. ISBN 0-300-11062-6.
- Masur, Gerhard. Simón Bolívar (Revised edition). Albuquerque: University of New Mexico Press, 1969.
- Bastardo-Salcedo, JL (1993) Historia Fundamental de Venezuela UVC, Caracas.
