= Maria J. Merino =

Spanish pathologist and physician-scientist

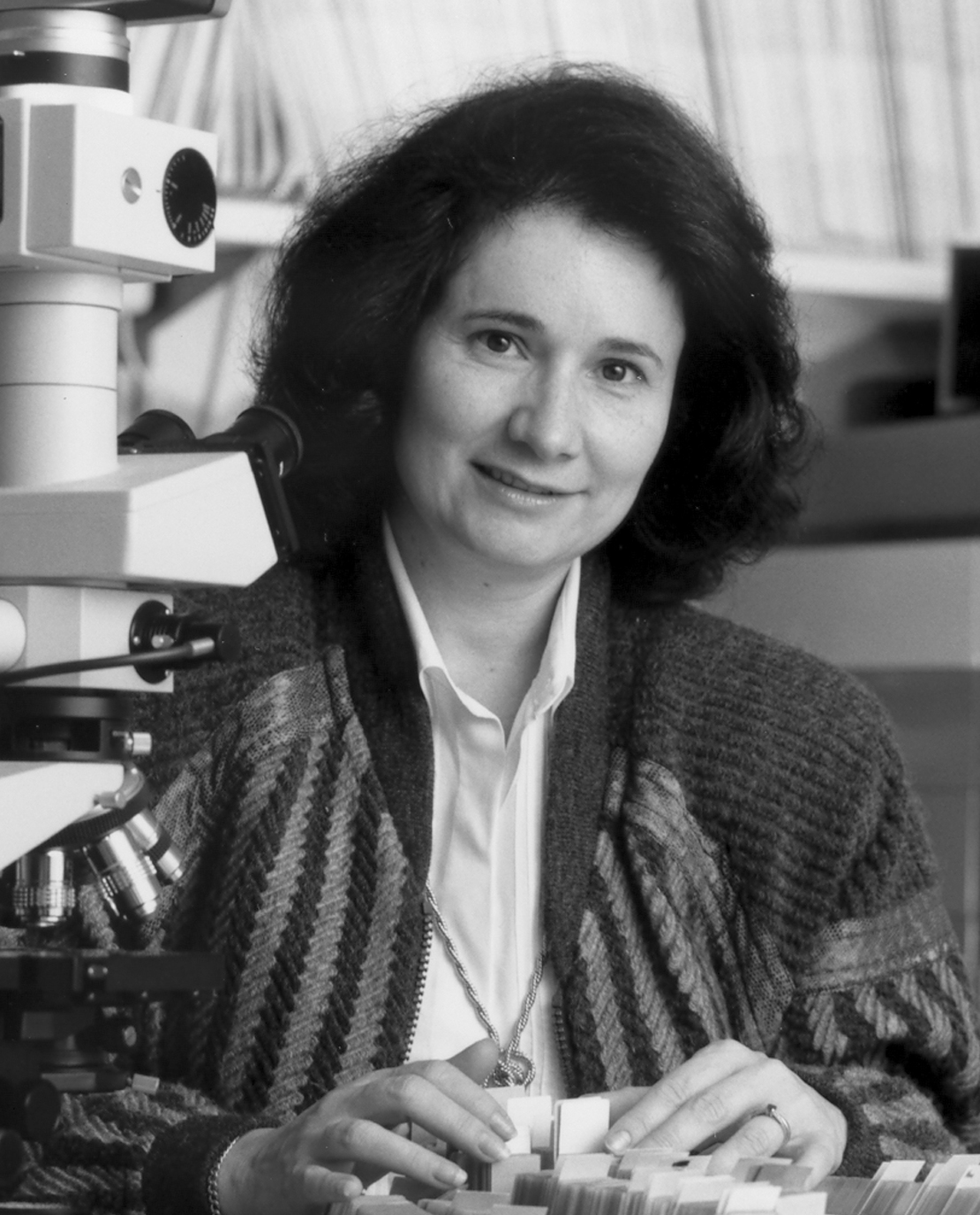
- 2003
- Born: 1950 (age 75–76); Valladolid, Spain
- Education: Central University of Venezuela
- Spouse: Ronald D. Neumann (m. 1979)
- Scientific career
- Fields: Pathology, clinical research
- Workplaces: Yale School of Medicine; National Cancer Institute

Maria J. Merino (born 1950) is a Spanish pathologist and physician-scientist. She researches tumor suppressor genes and breast cancer. Merino is chief of the translational surgical pathology section at the National Cancer Institute.

== Early life and education ==
Born in Valladolid, Spain, in 1950, Maria Merino's parents moved to Venezuela when she was still a young child. She finished high school at the Merici Academy in Caracas in 1966 and received a doctor of medicine degree from Central University of Venezuela in 1974. In 1974, she moved to the United States to complete a residency in pathology at Yale New Haven Hospital in New Haven, Connecticut, where she was also chief resident in pathology from 1977 to 1978. She completed her fellowship in surgical pathology at Yale New Haven Hospital in 1979, the same year that she married physician-scientist Ronald D. Neumann. Darryl D. Carter was Merino's mentor at Yale New Haven Hospital.

== Career ==
Following a series of pathology teaching positions at Yale School of Medicine and consultancies in surgical pathology at several Connecticut hospitals, Merino was appointed director of gynecologic pathology at Yale University in 1982. She came to the National Cancer Institute as senior medical officer and assistant chief of its pathology and postmortem sections in 1985, assuming her post as chief of the translational surgical pathology section and director of the histology lab in 1987.

Merino is a member of the National Cancer Institute's Breast Cancer Think Tank Task Force, and the Scientific Committee of Spain's Hispanicoamerican Congress of Anatomic Pathology, the American Society of Directors of Anatomic Pathology, the International Academy of Pathology, the American Society for Clinical Pathology, and the International Society of Gynecological Pathologists. She served as treasurer of the Arthur Purdy Stout Society of Surgical Pathologists through 2005.

=== Research ===
Merino's has researched how different tumor markers can be used to diagnose breast, gynecological, and thyroid cancers, as well as other endocrine tumors and soft tissue sarcomas. Along with her colleagues at the National Cancer Institute, she is working on identifying tumor suppressor genes in pre-malignant lesions of the breast, to see how they affect the development of breast cancer. Merino is interested in studying precancerous conditions that may lead to the development of invasive cancers.

== Awards and honors ==
In 1995, Merino was made a member of the Spanish Royal Academy of Medicine.
