= Francisco Mariño y Soler =

Colombian soldier, politician, and aristocrat

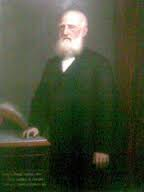

Lieutenant Colonel of Colombia Army during the War of Independence, Counselor of War, Brigadier General in Retirement, Senator of the Republic.
- In office 1809–1863

Major of Sogamoso City

Senator of Republic of New Granada

Senator of Granadine Confederation

Senator of United States of Colombia

Personal details
- Born: Francisco Mariño y Soler; 9 October 1780 Tunja, New Kingdom of Granada, Spanish Empire (present-day Colombia)
- Died: 31 August 1876 (aged 95) Tibasosa, Colombia (present-day Colombia)
- Spouse(s): Ana María Pinzón y Currea (first); Camila Franco y Currea (second)

Francisco Mariño y Soler (9 October 1780; 31 August 1876) was a soldier, politician, and aristocrat. He was a patriot and Knight of the Order of Santiago.

== Neogranadinan Revolution ==
As an intellectual and fervent defender of the human rights, he absorbs much of the eighteenth and nineteenth century literature. At the outbreak of revolution in New Granada, he is placed at the service of the Republic and is appointed Colonel of the Liberation Army.

He moves on to carry out some undercover reconnaissance using his social position and then proceeds to financially support the independence from Spain, affording Simon Bolivar's militia with lodging and victuals in addition to providing Bolívar's revolutionary armies with hefty stipends and numerous choice saddled horses on several occasions, until the liberation was completed.

When events thrust, the Restoration of the Spanish Monarchy and Pacification by the Spanish crown headed by General Pablo Morillo, brings about a violent pacification in the lands of the New Granada. From the Captaincy General of Venezuela Morillo warns the War Ministry of Spain about the situation and the three Mariño brothers rebellion, in special about Francisco and Ignacio.

Morillo receives absolute power to carry out his duties as General and reconquistador. He then imprisons and executes the majority of noblemen. Except for Francisco who is arrested instead, tried and confined to his house in Tibasosa (the same building that serves today as the Biblioteca Pública Francisco Mariño y Soler). While there, he devotes most of the time to reading and maturing his political outlook.

The sentence imposed on Francisco was never brought about. The very hand of the Spanish Crown over his head prevented General Pablo Morillo to vent his rage against him while also preserving his brother, Captain Fray Ignacio Mariño y Torres. However, Francisco's honors were stripped instead.

As a military, he fought in the Battle of Vargas Swamp near Bonza and the Battle of Boyacá.

== Republican life ==
At the dawn of Colombia's independence, Francisco becomes Mayor of the city of Sogamoso and after that he serves as a Senator of the Republic of New Granada, Granadine Confederation and United States of Colombia, where he is involved in the creation of laws and furthers the development of the nascent democracy. A fervent Catholic, he serves the state in different ways. One of those ways was to deliver most of its wealth and wealth to the nation that he helped build. As a politician, he was a constituent congressman and senator at different stages of development of Colombia.

== Private life ==
He retired from office when he considered the duties to his nation to be completely fulfilled, and settled in his hacienda "Ayalas", where he dedicated his time to agriculture and the care of his numerous offspring.

He was a Knight of the Order of the Liberator and the only Colombian to-date to have received the honorable title of Cincinnatus, an honor that he shares with George Washington.

NOTE:
Cincinnatus: Epigraph used after L. Quinctius Cincinnatus -and generally used to describe a virtuous Roman patrician-, a model of civic virtue. Cincinnatus saved Rome from the Celtic invasions of the North. Although the Roman dictatorship is attached to his name, it was not really a dictatorship as we know it today. This used to be an office held for a set time retrofitted with all the powers while implying the officer's resignation after completion of their missions.

The meaning of Cincinnatus when applied to Washington and Mariño is that of worthy, honest, generous, brave, noble, patrician of the nation. Essentially Primus Inter Pares.

This rare gentleman, as active and courageous in war as he was modest and peaceful in the home of his elders, determined his life in such fashion that he subjected himself to an unchanging hygienic system whereby he managed to live for almost a century.

He used to: get up at dawn, have a light breakfast at seven in the morning, walk great distances, eat sparingly at two in the afternoon, and go to bed at seven o'clock.

He had no vices; he did not even drink spirits. He never uttered a lie, or any word that would hurt. A firm believer in God, he knew how to worship uprightly.

== Family ==
Born in the Tunja city, Francisco Mariño y Soler was member of one of the most noble colonial families in Kingdom of New Granada which descends from one of the oldest and most noble lineages of Spain, the Mariño Lineage, undoubtedly related to most ancient, noble and royal lineages as stated in the history of the Grandees of Spain, The Mariño surname, has been associated through myth with mermaids: "Vilaxoán tiene a los Mariño, una familia de nobles vinculada a los seres mitológicos del mar, estrechamente relacionados con los mitos y las leyendas gallegas. El apellido de quienes fueron dueños del pazo de Sobrán hunde sus raíces, de hecho, en la nómina de seres fabulosos que se pasean por Galicia"

His parents were Miguel Augustín Mariño de los Reyes and María Josefa Soler y Currea. He was a great-great-grandson of Jerónimo Mariño de Lobeira y Sotomayor, Spanish explorer, settler, captain of the king and high justice in Santa Rosa de Viterbo, who arrived in America from Pontevedra between 1639 and 1641. His half-brother Ignacio Mariño y Torres, Dominican priest, colonel of liberty Army and Magister Misioniss and his cousin Santiago Mariño Carige Fitzgerald, General in Chief of East Army and President of Republic of Venezuela. Remarkably, his ancestors were: ambassadors, priests, ship owners, troubadours, businessmen, explorers, colonizers and rulers.

== Titles ==
- Knight of the Order of Santiago.
- Knight of the Order of Alcántara.
- Knight of the Order of the Liberator.

== Military grades and charges ==
- Lieutenant Colonel of the Liberation Army.
- Brigadier General at retirement.
- Mayor of the City of Sogamoso.
- Senator of the Republic.

== Republic Honors ==
- Cincinato.
- Patrician.

== Thought ==
- Freethinker
- Federalist
- Roman Catholic

== Francisco Mariño y Soler in images ==
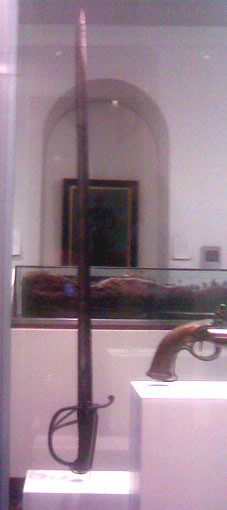
Francisco Mariño y Soler's Sabre.

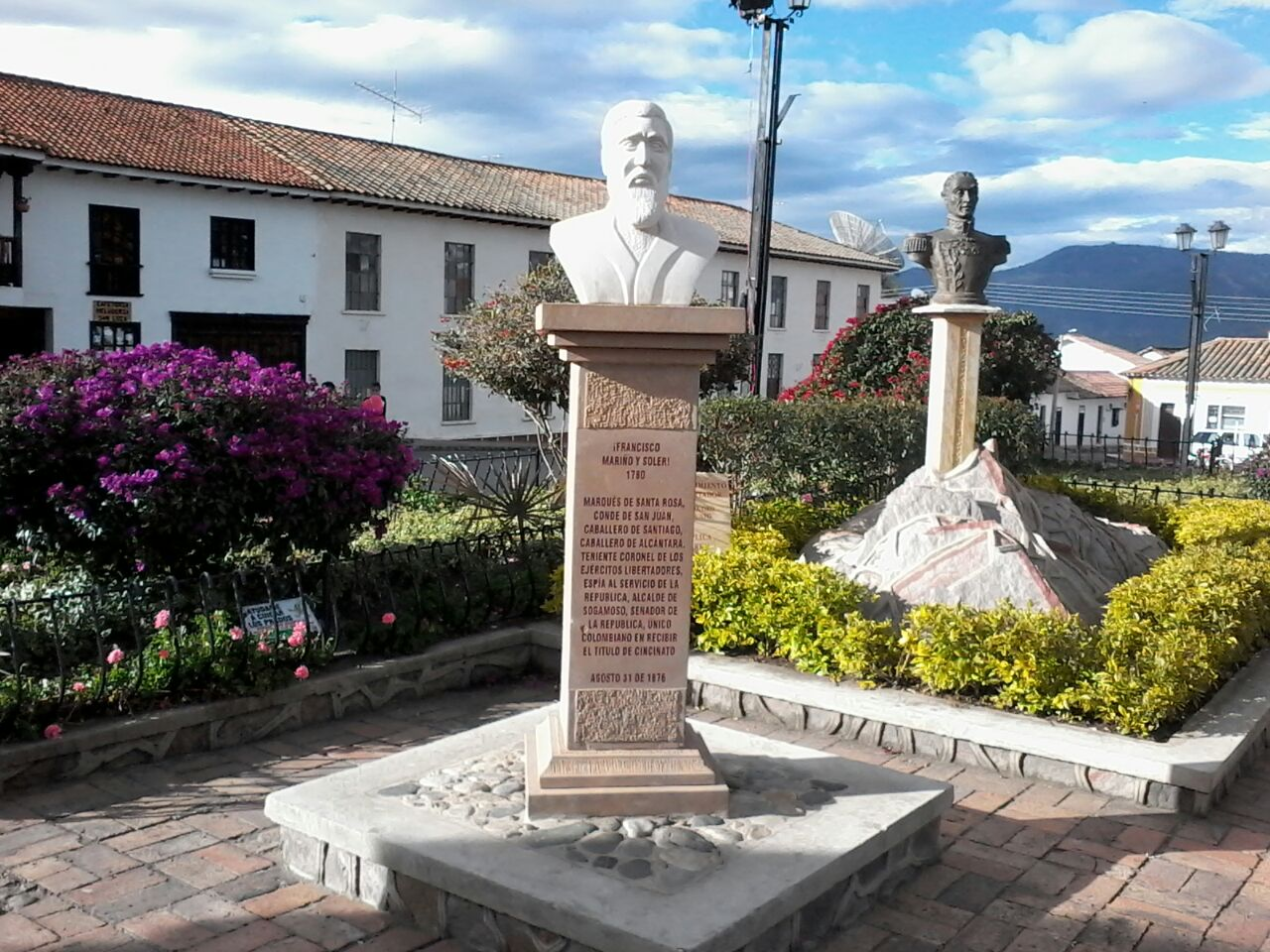
Francisco Mariño y Soler bust in Tibasosa, Boyacá main square.

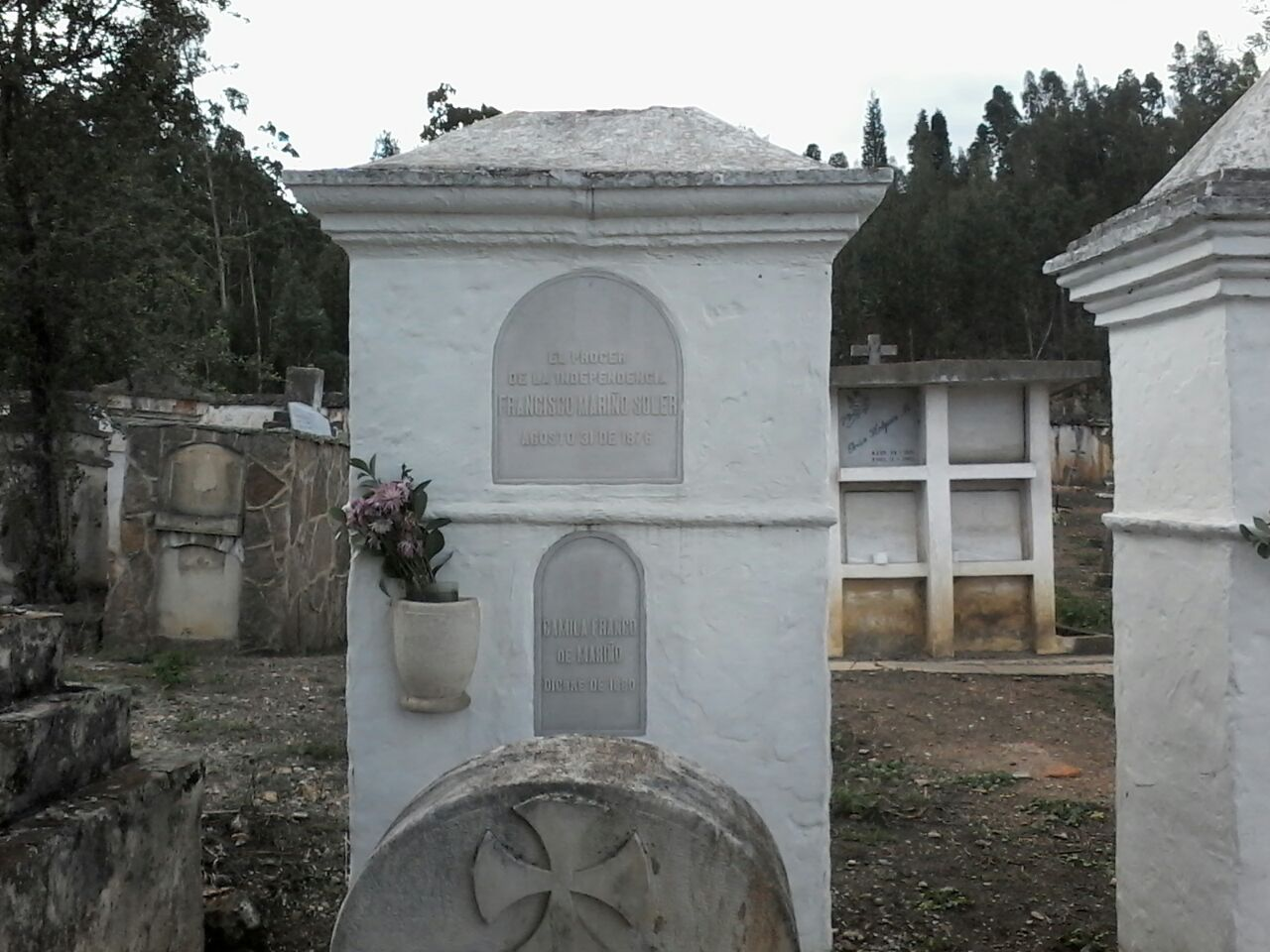
Francisco Mariño y Soler and Camila Franco y Currea (de Mariño) tombs in Tibasosa, Boyacá, Colombia.
