= Olga Merino =

Spanish writer (born 1965)

Olga Merino (born October 1965) is a Spanish writer. She was born in Barcelona, and studied in Spain and the UK. As a reporter for El periodico de Catalunya, she lived and worked in Moscow from 1993 to 1998. Her experiences there formed the basis of her debut novel Cenizas rojas (Red Ashes). Her second novel Espuelas de papel was published in 2004. In 2006, she obtained the Vargas Llosa NH Prize for her short story "Las normas son las normas". Her most recent work is Perros que ladran en el sótano published in 2012 to great critical acclaim.
