= Mariño =

Mariño is a Galician surname. This family name is spelled Marinho in Portuguese. Notable people with the surname include:

- Diego Mariño (born 1990), Spanish soccer player
- Pedro Mariño de Lobera, Spanish conquistador and author
- Francisco Mariño y Soler, Aristocrat / Lieutenant Colonel of Colombia Army / Counselor of War / Brigadier General in Retirement
- Santiago Mariño, Venezuelan General and Independence war hero
- Juan Carlos Mariño, Peruvian footballer
- María Mariño, Spanish author of Galician origin
- Ricardo Mariño, Argentine children's books author

== See also ==
- Marinho Chagas, real name Francisco das Chagas Marinho, former Brazilian football player
