= Marino railway station (Northern Ireland) =

Railway station in Holywood, Northern Ireland

Marino
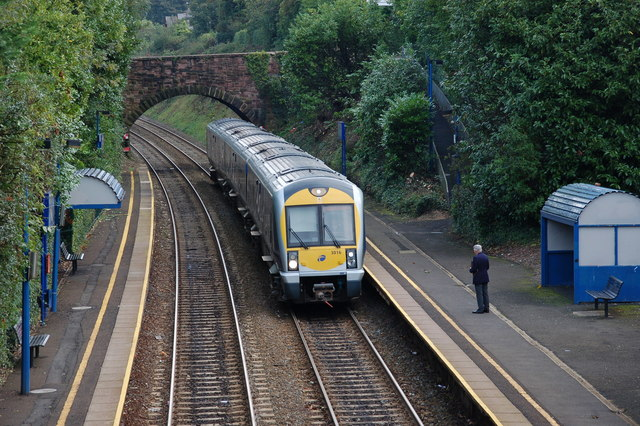
- Marino railway station in 2006

General information
- Location: Holywood; Northern Ireland
- Coordinates: 54.6470°N 5.8174°W
- Owner: NI Railways
- Operator: NI Railways
- Line: Bangor
- Platforms: 2
- Tracks: 2

Construction
- Structure type: At-grade

Other information
- Station code: MO

Key dates
- 1 December 1870: Opened
- 11 November 1957: Closed
- 4 January 1960: Reopened
- 2008: Refurbished

Passengers
- 2022/23: 68,864
- 2023/24: ▲89,750
- 2024/25: ▼86,397
- 2025/26: ▲93,499
- NI Railways; Translink; NI railway stations
Route map
(Click to expand)
Location
- Location within Northern Ireland Location within island of Ireland

Marino railway station is a railway station in the townland of Ballycultra in Holywood, County Down, Northern Ireland.

== History ==
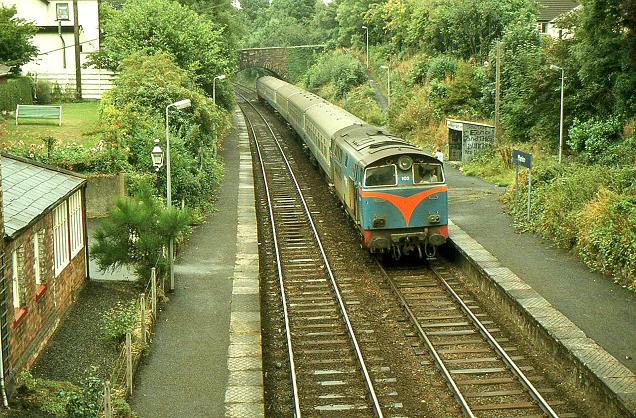
A NIR 101 Class diesel locomotive hauls a passenger train into Marino station in 1983

The Belfast, Holywood and Bangor Railway opened Marino station on 1 December 1870 on land once inhabited by Benedictine monks.

Due to low passenger numbers, the Ulster Transport Authority closed the station on 11 November 1957. However, under public pressure the UTA reopened it on 4 January 1960.

== Service ==
From Mondays to Saturdays there is a half-hourly service to Belfast Grand Central in one direction, and to Bangor in the other. More frequent trains run at peak times, and the service reduces to hourly in the evenings. Some peak-hour trains pass through Marino without stopping.

On Sundays there is an hourly service in each direction.

Preceding station	NI Railways	Following station
Holywood	Northern Ireland Railways; Belfast-Bangor Line	Cultra
