= Jacinto Lara =

Venezuelan independence leader

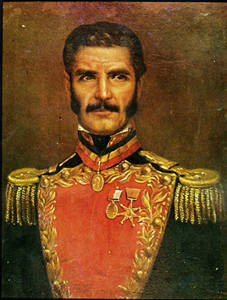
Jacinto Lara

Jacinto Lara (28 May 1777, Carora – 25 February 1859, Barquisimeto) was a Venezuelan independence leader and hero of the Venezuelan War of Independence. His contribution included participating in Simón Bolívar's 1813 Admirable Campaign. He was briefly Prefect of the Intendency of the Magdalena River and the Isthmus in 1821. He later led a reserve division at the Battle of Ayacucho (1824), a decisive military encounter during the Peruvian War of Independence.

== Biography ==
In 1812, he was appointed lieutenant colonel and went on to serve under command of Simon Bolívar. The following year he fought in the battle of Cúcuta against colonel Ramón Correa. Along with Bolívar, he participated in the Admirable Campaign (Campaña Admirable) distinguishing himself in the Battles of Niquitao, Los Horcones and Taguanes, on 2, 11 and 31 July of that year. He continued with the Liberator participating in the siege of Puerto Cabello and in the battles of Bárbula and Trincheras (two actions near Naguanagua) and Vigirima.

In 1814, he took part in the Battle of Carabobo, on 28 May, the day he turned 36, and then, under the orders of General Rafael Urdaneta, continued executing operations in the west of the country, including against 22 Capuchins, after Bolívar ordered them "removed" from the area around the town of El Chaparro. He participated in the retreat to Nueva Granada, where the command of Urdaneta's forces was assumed by Bolívar, and they marched to Santafé de Bogotá to fight against Manuel Bernardo Álvarez, concluding the operation in December of that same year.

== Legacy ==
The Venezuelan state of Lara was named after him, as was Barquisimeto's airport (Jacinto Lara International Airport). A public service and military award, Order of Division General Jacinto Lara, is named after him. He is buried in the National Pantheon of Venezuela.

== See also ==
- History of Venezuela
- Venezuelan War of Independence
- Military career of Simón Bolívar
- Spanish American wars of independence
