= Battle of Niquitao =

Coordinates: 09°41′00″N 70°45′00″W

- Part of Venezuelan War of Independence
Date	2 July 1813
Location	Boconó, Trujillo, Venezuela
Result	Venezuelan victory

Belligerents
Venezuelan separatists	Kingdom of Spain

Commanders and leaders
José Félix Ribas; Rafael Urdaneta; Vicente Campo Elías	José Martí

Strength
1,000 troops	800–1,000 troops

Casualties and losses
Minimal	232 killed, 450 prisoners, mostly incorporated into the patriot side, a greater number of rifles, ammunition, baggage and a large amount of war material.

The Battle of Niquitao was a part of the Venezuelan War of Independence which took place on 2 July 1813 in Boconó.

== Prelude ==
After the destruction of the First Venezuelan Republic by Domingo de Monteverde, most pro-independence politicians and soldiers, among them Simón Bolívar, went into exile in New Granada. From here, Bolivar prepared a new invasion of Venezuela, which was called the Admirable Campaign.

The 800 Patriot soldiers, organized into two divisions, fought a series of battles that made them advance into the State of Trujillo: Battle of Cúcuta (8 January 1813), Battle of Angostura de La Grita (13 April 1813) and Battle of Agua Obispo (14 May 1813).

== The Battle ==
Organized into two divisions under the command of José María Ortega and Rafael Urdaneta, the Patriot army clashed with the Royalist army on 2 July at dawn. The first division began the attack towards the center of the enemy ranks and later, the second division joined in, attacking the right wing. After four long hours, the Patriot cavalry also attacked, turning the battle in their favor, by overrunning the Royalist rearguard.

This intervention caused the Royalist army to become disorganized and forced them to retreat from their positions. The victory was complete, and followed by active pursuit. The surviving Royalists managed to retreat to Nutrias and San Fernando de Apure. Some 400 Royalists were taken prisoner, many of them defected to the patriots, and also abundant weapons and ammunition fell into the hands of the Patriots.

On 6 August 1813, the Admirable Campaign ended, when Brigadier Simón Bolívar was able to make his triumphant entry into Caracas.
