= Superbru =

Sports prediction website founded in South Africa

- Website type: Sports Prediction
- Founded: 2006
- Owner: SportEngage Ltd
- Parent: SportsEngage Ltd
- Website: www.superbru.com
- Current status: Running

Superbru is a sports prediction website, founded in 2006, owned by SportEngage Ltd. Predictions generally revolve around major competitions such as the FIFA World Cup, English Premier League, or Wimbledon, across different sports, such as rugby league and cycling.

Superbru has been used to show how data scientists can correctly predict scores; such as Principa out-predicting 99.68% of human predictions for the 2015 Rugby World Cup. As of 2018, Superbru has over 1.5 million registered users.

== History ==
SuperBru was founded in 2001 as a Super 12's prediction game, in the University of Cape Town, as a paper based league. In 2003, the game was merged online, with access not available to the public. In 2006, Superbru was opened; with financial support from web design company Nevado, and later created a United Kingdom version, called Sports Guru. (Note: SportsGuru would later merge into Superbru in 2012.) In 2011, Superbru moved away from Nevado, creating SportsEngage, financing the website.
