= José Ignacio París =

Don Ignacio París Ricaurte
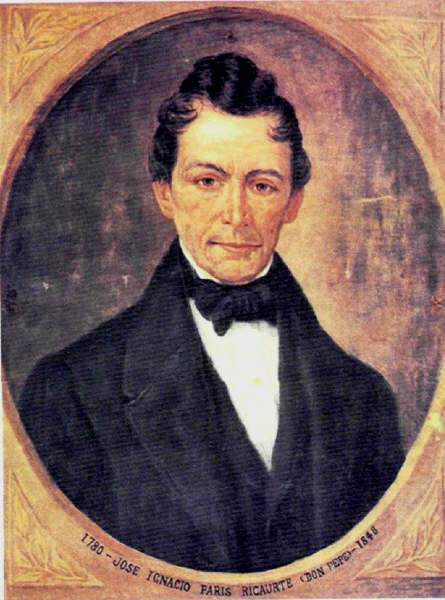
- Born: 1780
- Died: 1848 (aged 67–68)
- Resting place: Central Cemetery of Bogotá
- Occupations: Military, businessman, politician
- Era: 18th century & 19th century
- Parent: José Martín París Álvarez y Genoveva Ricaurte Mauris
- Relatives: Dolores Vargas París (niece)

José Ignacio París Ricaurte (Santafé, January 3, 1780 – October 31, 1848) was a hero of independence and businessman from New Granada, the first contractor for the Coscuez mines after the country's independence.

== Early life and education ==
José Ignacio París, known by the nickname of Don Pepe, was the second son of the Spanish captain José Martín París Álvarez and Genoveva Ricaurte Mauris. He married in Bogotá in 1812 with Juana María Prieto Ricaurte, with whom he was double related, being the daughter of Joaquín Prieto Dávila and Rosa Ricaurte Torrijos, the first grandson of María Francisca Ricaurte Terreros and the second daughter of Juan Agustín Ricaurte Terreros, of whom José Ignacio was a great-nephew.

The París Prieto marriage only lasted seven years due to the premature death of Juana María Prieto in 1819, leaving Manuela París Prieto and Enrique París Prieto as children. José Ignacio París was the father with Gregoria Ortega Páramo of the doctor Esteban París Ortega, who became the founder of the surname in Ibagué.

He was a college student at the Colegio Mayor de Nuestra Señora del Rosario. He was entrusted with organizing the welcome event for Viceroy Antonio Amar y Borbón. He traveled to Europe as a student in 1803. It is said that in Cádiz he entered the Masonic lodge and that there he met Simón Bolívar, with whom he was a close friend.

== Career ==
=== Military and public career ===
After the cry for independence, he enlisted in the Granada army in the cavalry weapon. He was taken prisoner in the battle of Bogotá in 1813. With the Spanish reconquest, he left Bogotá in 1816 with the troops that accompanied President José Fernández Madrid. After the defeat at the Battle of Cuchilla del Tambo, París established himself in Buga, where he met General José María Cabal. As the Spaniards found out that they had talked, they interrogated París to find the whereabouts of the Patriot general, giving him several blows that left him lying unconscious in his room, but without obtaining the persecuted information. Captured Cabal, París was taken to Popayán, where his execution sentence was commuted to prison, remaining in the Cárcel Grande de Bogotá until the victory of the liberating army over the Royalists in the Battle of Boyacá (1819).

Once the Republic was established, Paris was appointed Head of the National Court of Accounts. His generous spirit towards the Republic and prone to the defense of democratic institutions, recognized an objectivity of both his friends and his rivals. Proof of this was his open opposition to Simón Bolívar becoming a dictator or monarch, despite being his close friend. With the establishment of the dictatorship of his niece's husband Rafael Urdaneta, the confidence that his name inspired led to his being asked as a negotiator by the troops that rebelled in favor of the government of Joaquín Mosquera, deposed by the coup d'état.

=== Entrepreneur ===
The first company of José Ignacio Paris was an Italian pasta factory that operated in 1812. President Simon Bolívar granted Paris the contract for the exploitation of the Muzo and Coscuez mines that his great-grandfather José Salvador de Ricaurte had had in the colony, the which operated in a first stage with two European partners, who gave up the company, continuing it individually in Paris for twenty years. He also granted Bolívar ownership of the Fúquene Lagoon in exchange for him drying it up and thus putting its fertile soil at the service of the country, but Paris never executed the contract.

After ten years of exploitation that did not even generate the rent that he had to pay for the emerald mines, Paris ended up executed by the Governor of Vélez as a defaulter of the State. His brother Joaquín París, learned that the Santa Ana silver mine was successfully operating near his Peñas Blancas farm in Honda, went for advice and found the English engineer George Cheyne, who recommended the open pit system, achieving Don Pepe at From its implementation, an extraction of gems that made him one of the most distinguished men of his time.

=== Fate of the Muzo and Coscuez Mines ===
After the State contract with Paris ended in 1848, the exploitation of the mines was assumed by the government and in 1849 the company of Juan De Francisco Martín and Patrick Wilson leased them for ten years, an operation that in its last year was assumed by the Danish Carlos Michelsen, who took charge until 1861. When the government could not find a new tenant, he took over the exploitation of emeralds under the administration of the English engineer Tomás Fallon who had worked for years in the Santa Ana silver exploitation. death of the administrator in Muzo in 1863, the government of President Murillo Toro tendered again the exploitation of the mines in 1864 for a term of ten years, agreeing to the contract the German Gustave Lehmann, who coincidentally married in Bogotá.with Carolina París, great-niece of Don Pepe, and with whom he settled years later in the capital of France. In 1874, Aquileo Parra Gómez, secretary of finance for President Santiago Pérez, proposed the sale of the emerald mines because the government did not have effective control over their exploitation. The government decided to lease them back, placing the responsibility on Juan Sordo Girardot, who ceded his rights to the Esmeraldas Mining Company made up of Antonio and Silvestre Samper Agudelo, Wenceslao Pizano, José María Gómez Restrepo, Temístocles Paredes, Francisco Noguera, Manuel Uribe Toro, Guillermo Uribe, Jorge Holguín, Carlos Martín, Carlos Bonitto, Eusebio Bernal and José Antonio Obregón. Law 28 of 1878 handed over the ownership of the mines to the State of Boyacá without prejudice to the current lease agreement. In 1875, the lease of the mines was taken by Lorenzo Merino, who supported the operation after the ownership of the mines returned to the nation with the Constitution of 1886. In 1894, the exploitation contract was assumed by the Frenchman Alejandro Mancini. In 1904 the exploitation passed to a Colombian syndicate chaired by Laureano García Ortiz and in 1905 the commercialization of emeralds was separated, being in charge of the Cortés Comercial Banking house with address in London. In 1908 the union sold its operation to the Colombian Emerald Company of London, which was only able to carry on the business until 1910, the year in which the Government ignored the validity of the contract.

In 1846, the city of Bogotá granted Don Pepe París for 99 years, the exploitation of its waters in partnership with his relative Valerio Ricaurte Neira, importing from Europe the steel tubes for the first pipes that carried the water from the basin. from the square of San Carlos. After Paris died, the company lasted only three years, due to differences between his son Enrique and Mr. Ricaurte.

The philanthropic vocation of Paris led him to promote the demolition of the old houses that threatened ruin on the western side of the main square of Bogotá, seeking to improve the surroundings of this important public place. He wanted to advance with those on the eastern side, but General Santander denied his claim because he wanted to reserve that space for a government palace. Resident in the United States shortly after independence was achieved, he met the Spanish José María Barrionuevo, sponsoring his trip to New Granada to improve the Army's weapons. Interested in the economic development of the country, Paris was the one who brought the elephant grass type grass for the development of livestock, which he updated after the contribution made by Antonio Nariño with cart grass. He offered the government funding for accounting studies for the person he designated to bring that knowledge to the country. In 1842, he sent two weaving machines and one hundred sets of cards to the Casa de Refugio in Bogotá with two Italian instructors who were in charge of installing and teaching them. Always with the vocation of not allowing the historical memory of independence to be lost, he collected the money to build the mausoleum for the remains of General Antonio Nariño, and donated a bust in memory of the hero Camilo Torres Tenorio and the monuments for the burial of José María from Castillo Rada in the chapel of La Bordadita and from General Juan José Neira in the Central Cemetery. He was recognized at his time as the close friend of General Simón Bolívar. The precariousness of his situation, since he did not obtain profits from his emerald business, led Bolívar to leave the Portocarrero country house in his care, a property that the Bogota society had presented to the Liberator with the victory in Boyacá. Bolívar's correspondence with Paris is abundant and in many letters the faithful friend of the Liberator reported to him the state of his property. In the two attacks that Bolívar suffered, Paris was present. The first, which occurred in August 1828, was during a walk at the Fucha hacienda with José Ignacio and his brother Ramón París. In the September conspiracy, although Paris was not in the San Carlos Palace, there are references that Manuela Saenz reminded Bolívar that he could escape through the window that Pepe París had once said was good for jumping.

When leaving Bogotá in exile, former President Bolívar donated his Quinta de Portocarrero to José Ignacio París, a transaction that gave rise to the first public deed of the Second Notary of Bogotá, a copy of which is exhibited in its facilities and in which text the Liberator expressed his great friendship for Paris and the condition that the property passed then to his daughter, Manuela París Prieto. José Ignacio París, concerned that the memory of Bolívar might be lost, commissioned the Italian sculptor Pietro Tenerani to produce a bronze statue 4 which he first destined for the gardens of the Quinta de Bolívar and later donated to the Granada Congress, so that the corporation could Once he delivered it to the city and ordered its installation on July 20, 1846, in the main square of Bogotá.

=== Later life ===
Paris began to suffer from severe pain in his left arm that forced him to seek medical treatment in Europe, choosing to settle in Paris in 1839 with his son Enrique, where he underwent surgery twice to remove cancerous tumors. From Europe he was able to sponsor the study trip of his nephew Rafael Guillermo Urdaneta Vargas, who left written the diary of his stay in Europe. He also received Pedro María and Celestino, being the first witness to his uncle Pepe's contract with Tenerani for the execution of the statue of Bolívar for twelve thousand pesos, as well as the person in charge of bringing the pedestal for the monument to Bogotá, whose transfer he It deserved exhausting days, especially on the ascent route from Honda to Bogotá. This original piece is currently in the entrance to the current Quinta de Bolívar museum in Bogotá.

Tenerani's final proposal was complemented by the cape of José Ignacio París, who, upon visiting his workshop, inadvertently threw his clothing on the unfinished model, giving the famous sculptor what had made him dissatisfied with the creation of he. Having received Tenerani's wax model, Paris transferred his residence to Munich where he had the statue cast in the workshops of J. Millien. Paris returned to New Granada in 1845 with the Del Castillo and Neira mausoleums. In 1846 he was patron of the fledgling Philharmonic Society, dedicated to music training and dissemination of said art. In 1848, Paris agreed to be a benefactor of the Caldas Institute, created by President Mosquera for the scientific education of Colombians. In October 1846 the tumors reappeared in Don Pepe's left arm, and his limb had to be amputated on the recommendation of the doctor Ricardo Cheyne, who gave him two more years to live if he underwent surgery. Paris found relief from his pain, but had to deal with the loss of orientation and balance for several days, which he fully recovered. In July 1848, he finalized the contract for the exploitation of the Muzo mines, which he was able to liquidate in peace and safe from his obligations to the Government, and he died three months before the prognosis of Dr. Cheyne was fulfilled. The city of Bogotá gave him an outstanding funeral for two days, which ended with the deposit of his remains in a mausoleum that still exists in the Central Cemetery of Bogotá.
