= Battle of Carabobo =

1821 battle of the Venezuelan War of Independence

Coordinates: 10°00′16″N 68°09′57″W

Second Battle of Carabobo
- Part of the Venezuelan War of Independence
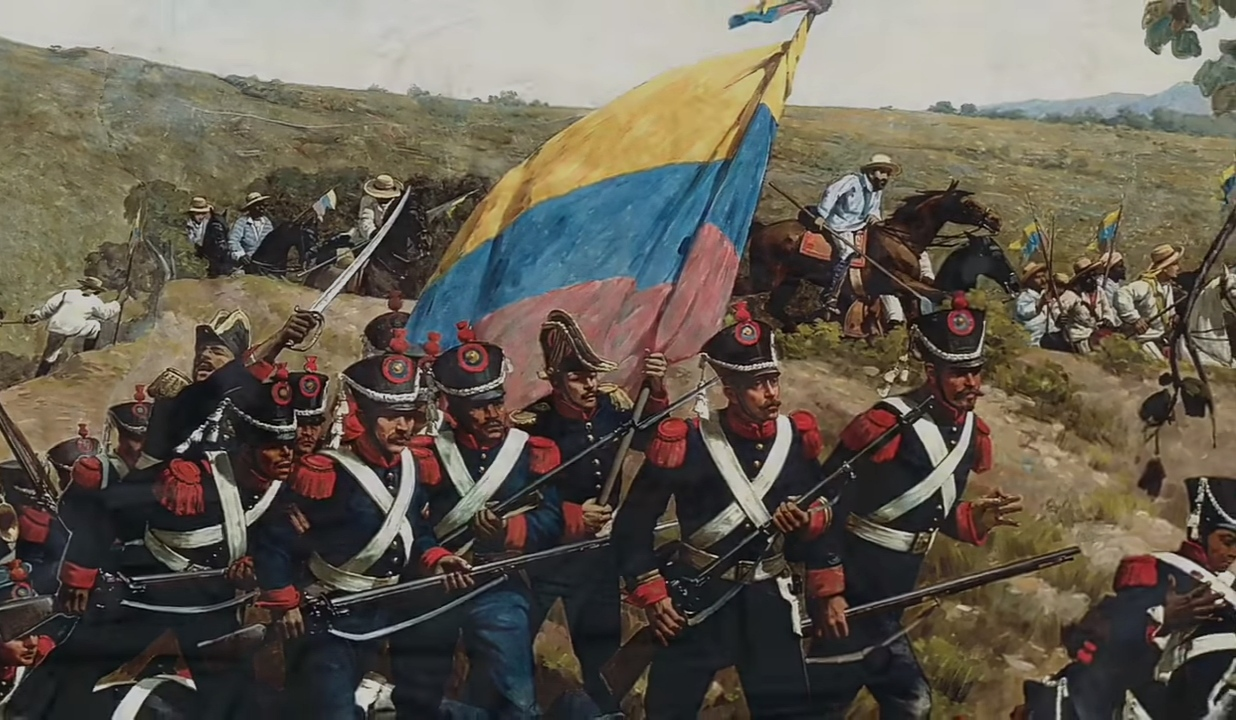
- La Batalla de Carabobo, Martín Tovar y Tovar
Date	24 June 1821
Location	Carabobo, Venezuela
Result	Colombian victory

Belligerents
Gran Colombia	Spain

Commanders and leaders
Simón Bolívar; José Antonio Páez	Miguel de la Torre

Strength
6,500–8,000: British Legions (350)	4,000–5,000: Spanish expeditionaries (850)

Casualties and losses
300 killed and wounded, including 119 British Legionaries dead	2,908 killed, wounded and captured

The Second Battle of Carabobo (Spanish: Batalla de Carabobo), on 24 June 1821, was fought between independence fighters, led by Venezuelan General Simón Bolívar, and the Royalist forces, led by Spanish Field Marshal Miguel de la Torre. Bolívar's decisive victory at Carabobo led to the independence of Venezuela and establishment of the Republic of Gran Colombia.

== Before the battle ==
There were several events that led to the Battle of Carabobo. Francisco de Miranda, famed patriot that tried to free many Latin American countries alongside Simón Bolívar, had taken control of Caracas from 1810 to 1812. The Spanish took back control and Miranda was handed to the royalists because Bolívar, in one of the most questionable decisions of his life, believed him to be a traitor. Bolívar then fled from Venezuela, after which he organized the Admirable Campaign in 1813 and re-established the Second Republic of Venezuela. Bolívar would lose Venezuela again in 1814 and he would re-establish the Venezuelan Republic one more time before uniting with the New Granada to form the Gran Colombia union.

By 1818 the Third Republic of Venezuela had been established with the task of liberating the entirety of Venezuela. Bolivar aimed to liberate New Granada, with the goal of establishing a new country, Gran Colombia (a region consisting of what we know today as Colombia, Ecuador, Panama, and Venezuela). The Republic of Colombia was formed in 1819, with Bolívar as president. Once Colombia established independence, Bolivar moved on to liberate Venezuela.

In 1820, an armistice was made between the Spanish, under General Pablo Morillo, and the Patriots, under Bolívar. During the years after he fled from Venezuela, Bolívar spent a lot of time regrouping his forces. He stationed his men on Lake Maracaibo, an area that was occupied by the loyalists. Bolívar had numerical superiority over the loyalists but it would still be a challenge.

== The battle ==
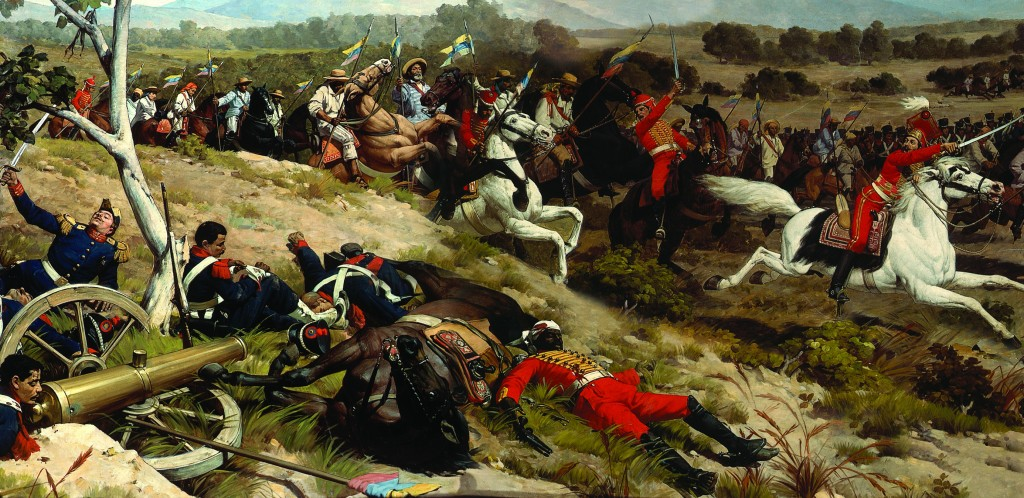
Painting by Martín Tovar y Tovar.

The Royalists occupied the road leading from Valencia to Puerto Cabello. As Bolívar's force of 6,500 or 8,000 (which included 340 or 350 men of the British Rangers battalion, the great majority of them of Anglophone origin of the so-called "British Legions") approached the Royalist position, Bolívar divided his force and sent half on a flanking maneuver through rough terrain and dense foliage. Bolívar led the attack through the center while Gen. José Antonio Páez went around to the right flank. But before they could do it, the two Spanish field guns fired on the lines.

Gen. Miguel de la Torre, commander of the Spanish, also split his force and sent half to deal with this flank attack. Hitting the Patriots, led by the Apure Braves Battalion, with musket fire, the Royalists initially held back the assault. Though the Venezuelan infantry failed in their attack and retreated, the men of the British battalion, commanded by Colonel Thomas Ilderton Ferrier and including many former members of the famed King's German Legion, fought hard and eventually succeeded in taking the hills. Though greatly outnumbered and low on supplies, the legion soldiers managed to maintain control of the tactically critical hills. By the battle's end, the legionary force had suffered 119 deaths, of which 11 were officers. Col. Ferrier was among the dead. Bolívar later praised the Legion troops and called them the "Saviors of my Fatherland", noting that they had distinguished themselves among other armies.

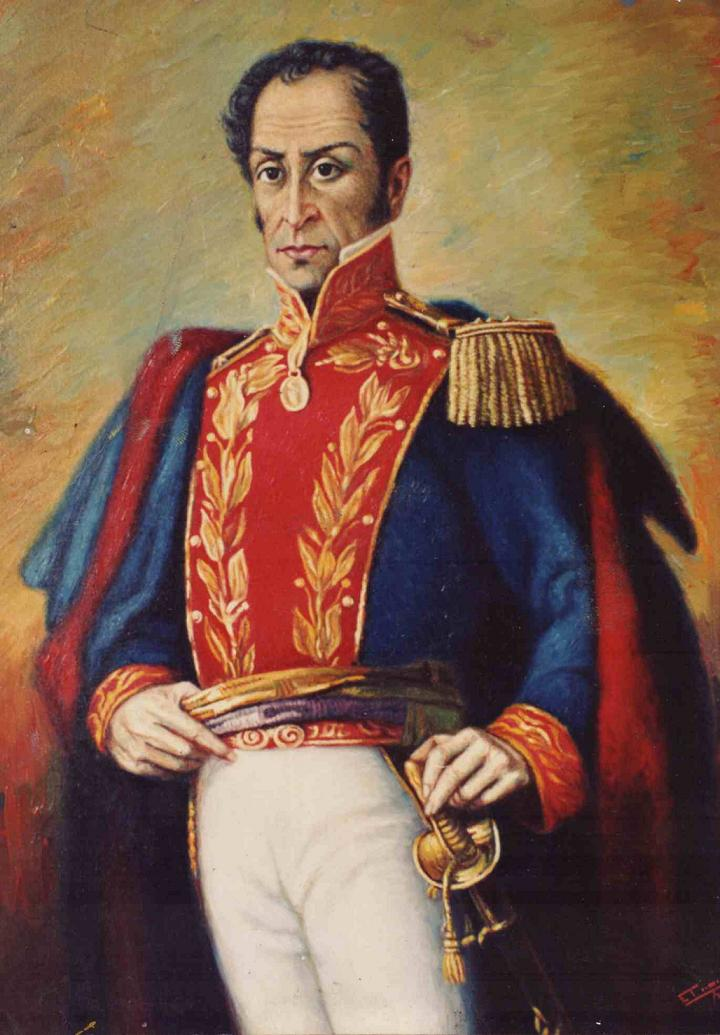
Simón Bolívar.

As the Legion gained the top, the Apure Braves and 2 companies of the Tirailleurs Battalion (2nd Division) reinforced them, and pushed the enemy off, just as Pedro Camejo, lance in hand, was trying to rally the formations, only to be killed due to two shots to the chest from enemy gunfire, in front of General Páez. Páez, watching him in retreat, told him that he was a coward, to which, with his dying breath, Camejo responded: No, I am not! My general, I have to tell you goodbye, because now I am dead! The cavalry militia of royalist "Llanero" fled from battlefield as the Patriot infantry fought hard, and the patriot cavalry led by Colonel Munoz eventually broke through the Royalist lines on the center, and marched towards the rear of de La Torre's force. The Spanish infantry formed squares and fought to the end under the attack of the Patriot cavalry, but one battalion retreated in the face of the enemy. The rout was so bad that only some 400 of one infantry regiment managed to reach safety at Puerto Cabello. With the main Royalist force in Venezuela crushed, independence was ensured. Subsequent battles included a key naval victory for the independence forces on 24 July 1823 at the Battle of Lake Maracaibo and in November 1823 José Antonio Páez occupied Puerto Cabello, the last Royalist stronghold in Venezuela.

The victory was a hard-won one for the independence forces. Both Ambrosio Plaza and Manuel Cedeño, commanders of the 2nd and 3rd Divisions, were killed in the battle by the enemy.

== Commemoration ==
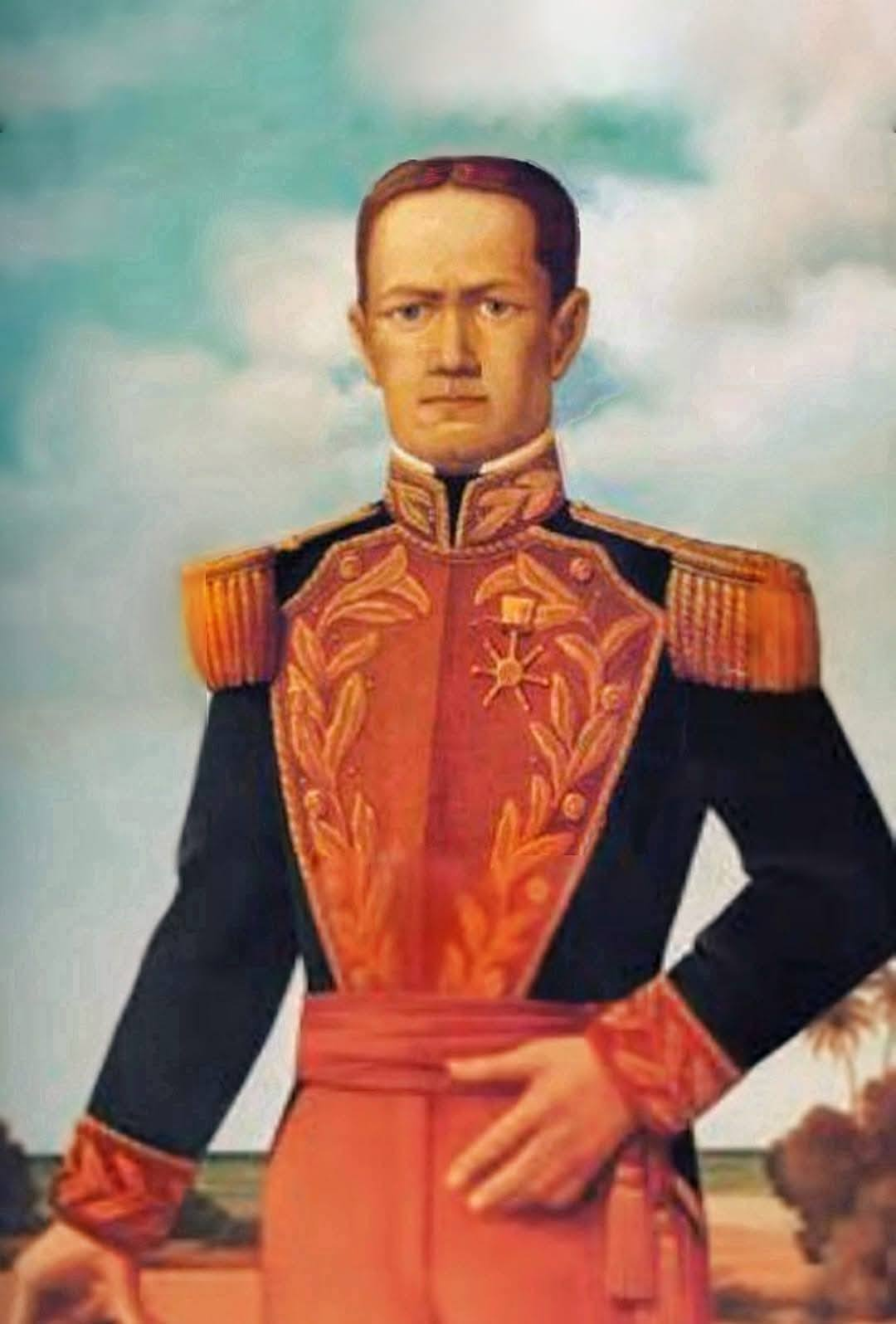
Brazilian General Abreu e Lima, who fought for the Republicans.

24 June is celebrated as Battle of Carabobo Day. This day is also called "Army Day" in Venezuela.

Every year during the month of June; the 24th specifically, honors the most important battle of the Venezuelan War of Independence and the largest battle of that war that finally secured national independence after years of war against Spain. It is a national celebration that is televised and streamed on the Internet. It lasts all day with a military parade of the Venezuelan Army, showing to public all armaments, tanks, battalions, weapons, etc. of the ground forces, as the main highlight, during the midday hours.

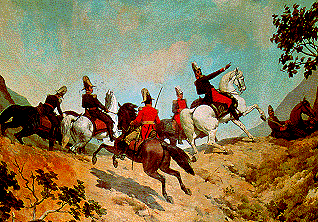
Painting by Martín Tovar y Tovar.

== See also ==
- Ambrosio Plaza
- Nevado, Bolívar's dog, who died in the Battle of Carabobo.
