= Ambrosio Plaza =

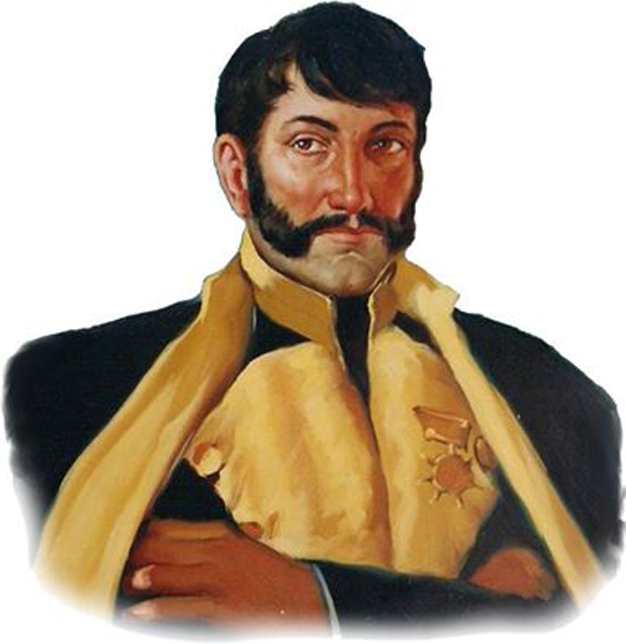
- Ambrosio de La Plaza y Obelmejia

Ambrosio de La Plaza y Obelmejia (December 7, 1791 – June 25, 1821) was a military figure involved in the Venezuelan War of Independence. Born in Caracas, he joined the army at the age of 19. He fought under Francisco de Miranda and later served under Simón Bolívar. Involved in operations against royalist forces entrenched in Bogotá in 1814, he later fled with Bolívar to Jamaica and Haiti.

Plaza returned to South America and was involved in the liberation of New Granada, and participated in the battles of Gámeza, Pantano de Vargas, and Boyacá. He fought and died in the Battle of Carabobo.
