= Dolores Vargas París =

South American independence figure

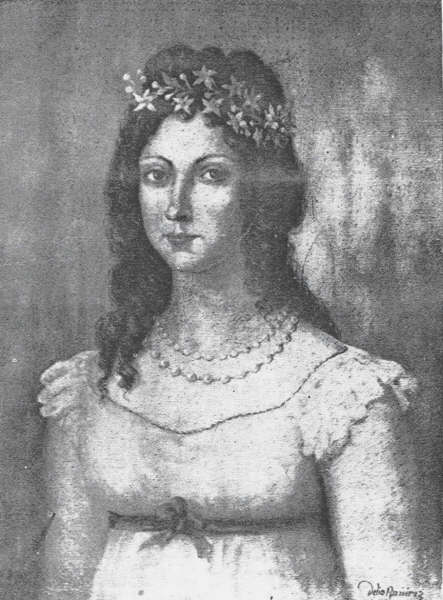
- Born: María Magdalena Dolores Vargas de París y Ricaurte; 1800; Santa Fe, Viceroyalty of New Granada
- Died: 28 October 1878 (aged 77–78); Caracas, Venezuela
- Known for: Spouse of the president of the Gran Colombia (1830–1831)
- Spouse: Rafael Urdaneta
- Children: Rafael; Luciano; Octaviano; Adolfo; Eleázar; Nephtalí; Amenodoro; Susana; Rosa; Dolores; Rodolfo
- Relatives: José Ignacio París (uncle)

Dolores Vargas París (née María Magdalena Dolores Vargas de París y Ricaurte; 1800 – 28 October 1878) was a Gran Colombia pro-independence activist and wife of General Rafael Urdaneta, first lady of the republic between 1830 and 1831.

== Act of Independence ==
Shw was born in Santa Fe in 1800. She was one of the daughters of the marriage between Ignacio de Vargas Tavera and María Ignacia París Ricaurte. At age 15, Dolores lost her mother, who died on 7 October 1815, while giving birth to a son. A few months later, after the Viceroyalty of New Granada was reestablished with the reconquest of the United Provinces of New Granada by the Spanish Empire, her father (Ignacio de Vargas Tavera) and grandfather (José Martín París Álvarez) were taken to prison by order of General Pablo Morillo, leaving Dolores alone to take care of her two younger siblings: José Ignacio and Teresa. She presented herself before the courts in order to negotiate the liberation of her father and grandfather, in exchange for jewels and other very valuable objects that belonged to her family for generations; the value amounted to about 40,000 reales. The Spanish had recently reconquered the rebel nation, and as retribution to her family for having been part of those who had instigated revolts around the region, they took the jewels, but also hanged her father and sentenced her grandfather to death by firing squad. She was banished from the city and ordered to march to Facatativá with her grandmother (Genoveva Ricaurte Mauris).

Years later, after the triumph of the patriot troops over the royalists at the Battle of Boyacá on 7 August 1819, the Santa Fe society organized an act of triumphal entry for the official victors. For her sacrifices, she was designated to place the laurel crown on El Libertador, Simón Bolívar.

== Marriage to Rafael Urdaneta ==
Dolores married Rafael Urdaneta in Santa Fe, Gran Colombia, on 31 August 1822.

Before Gran Colombia was dissolved in 1831, the marriage had enjoyed much popularity. However, following the dissolution and the establishment of a dictatorship in the Republic of New Granada, they were forced to flee the country. Upon reaching Maracaibo, Venezuela, Urdaneta's native city, they suffered persecution from General Páez, who had been one of Bolívar's ideological adversaries after the end of the Venezuelan War of Independence. Urdaneta and Dolores had been extremely close and loyal friends to Bolivar so they were forced to flee again, this time to Curaçao (Curazao).

In 1832, they were able to return to Caracas through a license granted to the family by the government of Venezuela, but it conditioned her husband to not intervene in the politics of the country. The family moved to Santa Ana de Coro, where a revolt erupted against the government, which opened the doors for her husband to get involved in politics once again. He was eventually able to retain a position as a senator for a few years.

After experiencing a period of economic difficulties, Urdaneta was appointed ambassador of Venezuela in Spain on 1845, but was only able to retain that position for a month before dying due to complications from kidney stones. Dolores was able to survive with a pension approved by the Venezuelan congress, and she took care of her children until they were capable of attaining important positions in Venezuelan society.

She died in Caracas on 28 October 1878.

Unofficial roles
Preceded by María Josefa Mosquera	Spouse of the president of the New Granada; 1855–1857	Succeeded by Juana Jurado de Caicedo
