= Mercedes Abrego =

Colombian independence movement heroine

Mercedes Abrego de Reyes (died 1813) was a heroine of the Colombian independence movement.

She was born and raised in Cúcuta. She married José Marcelo Reyes at a very young age. They had three sons, and her husband died a few years later.

== Life ==
When the war of independence began, Abrego gave her enthusiastic support to those fighting against Spanish rule. She was a fervent admirer of Simón Bolívar, whom she came to know during the latter's military campaigns in Cúcuta.

Abrego actively worked with the patriotic armies which were fighting in the Cucuta valley against the Spanish colonial forces of Ramón Correa and Bartolomé Lizón. When Bolívar was organizing his troops for the Admirable Campaign of 1813, Abrego presented him with a coat embroidered in gold and sequins that she had made herself.

Through her numerous contacts, she maintained secret communications with General Francisco de Paula Santander, advising him about the movements of the royalist army. Abrego's information network contributed to Santander's victories in San Faustino and Capacho, against the troops of Matute and Cañas.

After Santander was defeated on the plains of Carrillo in October 1813, the Spanish commander Bartolomé Lizón occupied Cucuta and captured Abrego. She was accused of conspiring against the colonial army and aiding and abetting the revolutionary guerrillas. Her death sentence was carried out on 21 October 1813.
