= Battle of Taguanes =

1813 battle in Tinaquillo, Venezuela

- Part of The Admirable Campaign
Date	31 July 1813
Location	Tinaquillo, Venezuela 9°55′N 68°18′W
Result	Patriot victory Domingo de Monteverde flees to Puerto Cabello

Belligerents
Venezuelan Patriots; United Provinces of New Granada	Spanish Empire

Commanders and leaders
General Simon Bolivar	Col. Julián Izquierdo †

Strength
2,500	1,800

The Battle of Taguanes was fought between Spanish royalists and the Second Republic of Venezuela on 31 July 1813 during the Admirable Campaign of the War of Venezuelan Independence.

Simon Bolivar and his patriots won the battle handily, defeating the Spanish (and killing their colonel) and eventually capturing Valencia on 2 August and Caracas on 3 August.
