= Nevado =

Simón Bolívar's dog

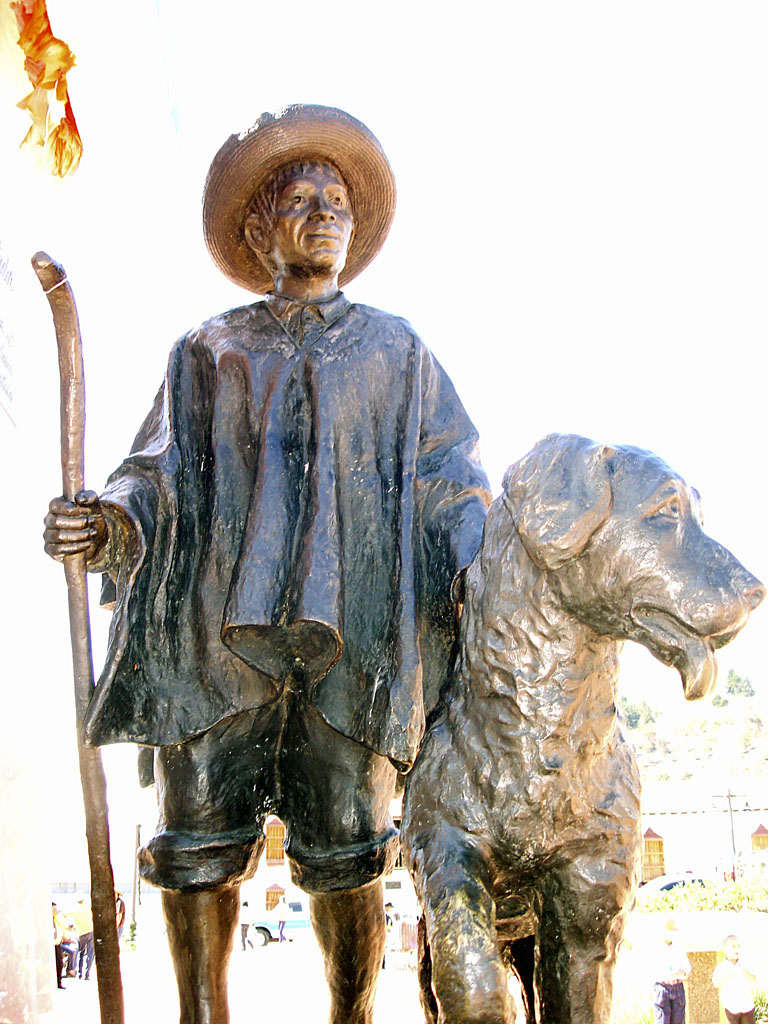
- A statue to the dog Nevado and the Indian Tinjaca, the two companions of Simón Bolívar, on Plaza Bolívar de Mucuchíes, Mérida, Venezuela.
- Species: Canis lupus familiaris
- Breed: Mucuchies
- Sex: Male
- Born: c. 1813
- Died: 24 June 1821; Carabobo, Venezuela
- Owner: Simón Bolívar

Nevado (1813? – 1821) was a Mucuchies dog that was given to Simón Bolívar by the local people of Mucuchíes, Mérida, in the Venezuelan Andes.

== Life ==
It was given as a kind of present shortly after the Battle of Niquitao during his triumphal Admirable Campaign from New Granada (today Colombia) to Caracas in 1813. Bolivar's army was approaching a farm when the independence fighters were stopped in their tracks by a giant, barking guard dog. Weapons drawn, the rebels were about to kill the dog when Bolivar, marveling at its beauty and bravery, ordered them to back down. Nevado always ran beside Bolívar's horse, no matter if he traveled through cities or battlefields. Nevado died in the Battle of Carabobo on June 24, 1821. When Bolívar received news that Nevado was badly injured, he rushed to the dog, but he came too late.

Several monuments to Nevado stand at the entrance of Mucuchíes town.
