= Battle of Cúcuta =

- Part of Spanish American wars of independence
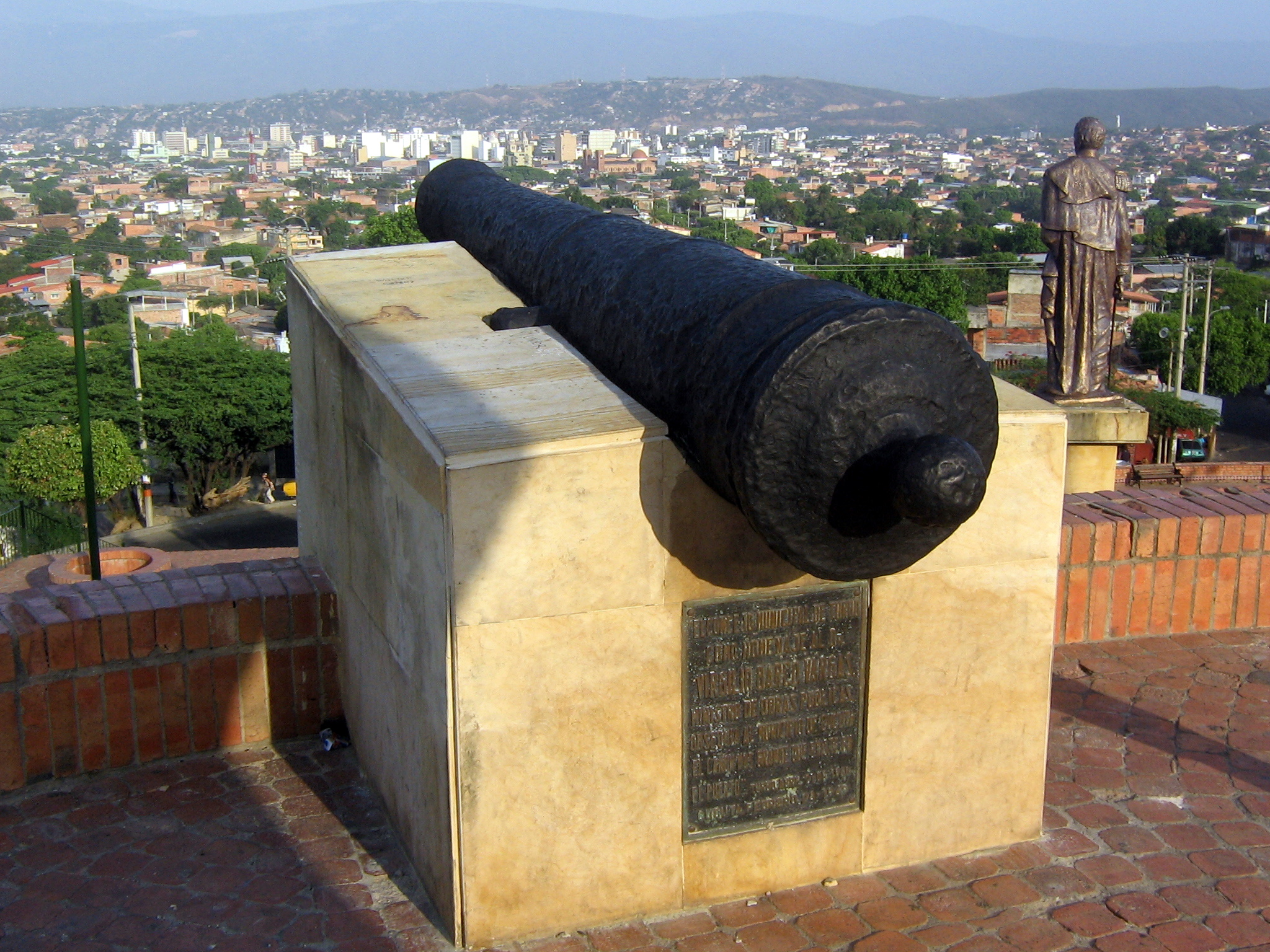
Date	28 February 1813
Location	Cúcuta, Viceroyalty of New Granada (present day Colombia)
Result	Patriot victory: Royalist withdrawal from Cúcuta; Patriot control of the Cúcuta Valley; Strategic prelude to the Admirable Campaign

Belligerents
United Provinces of New Granada: Troops of the Union; Forces from Cartagena; Troops from Pamplona	Spanish Monarchy: Royalist forces of New Granada and Venezuela

Commanders and leaders
Simón Bolívar; José Félix Ribas; Juan Salvador Narváez; Pedro Guillín Lino Ramírez	Ramón Correa

Strength
400	800

Casualties and losses
2 dead and 14 wounded	20 dead and 40 wounded

The Battle of Cúcuta was a military conflict in the Spanish American wars of independence fought on 28 February 1813 between the pro-independence forces led by Simón Bolívar and Spanish royalist troops under General Ramón Correa at the town of Cúcuta, in present-day Colombia, close to the border with Venezuela. Bolivar was victorious. The battle gained him much support and immediately preceded his march into Venezuela, later dubbed the Admirable Campaign.

== The battle ==
The battle began at 9:00 a.m. on 28 February 1813, and finished in the early afternoon involving four hundred men under the command of Simón Bolívar and eight hundred under Spanish General Ramón Correa fought. There were two fatalities and fourteen injuries among Bolívar's troops, and twenty fatalities and forty injured among Correa's troops.

=== Events ===
Simón Bolívar, under orders of the United Provinces of New Granada launched an offensive against the Spanish forces along the eastern banks of the Tachira River. Bolívar's campaign ended in victory, enabling him to drive Royalist forces from the valleys of Cúcuta.

On 28 February 1813, the Sunday of Carnival, General Correa went to church; meanwhile Bolívar's forces had positioned themselves in the western hills that overlook the town of Cúcuta. General Correa learned of this movement and set out to drive Bolívar's troops from their positions. A force of about 100 Royalist infantry tried to overcome the right flank of Bolívar's army, but a fast change of position foiled the attempt. There was heavy fighting throughout the morning. The battle lasted four hours before it was decided. In the afternoon, Bolívar ordered a bayonet charge, which drove General Correa's men from the field.

The decimated troops fled to San Antonio del Táchira and to La Grita.

Simon Bolívar entered Cúcuta with his soldiers and declared victory from General Correa's captured headquarters.

=== After the conflict ===
Supporters of independence rejoiced and cooperated openly with Bolívar. Mercedes Abrego de Reyes, in order to show her support and admiration for Bolívar, embroidered a coat for him, which he wore during the Admirable Campaign that liberated Venezuela from the Spanish; she was later arrested by the Spanish, accused of conspiracy and executed on 13 October 1813.

== According to Bolivar ==
Bolivar's Aide-de-Camp General O'Leary published Bolivar's account of the battle in his memoirs:

"After the arrival at my headquarters in San Cayetano of supplies, the rearguard and one hundred and twenty-six men from the Union under the command of Captains Uscátegui and Ramirez, we crossed the Zulia river yesterday afternoon and at dawn today we started out for the capital of Cúcuta and the enemy's headquarters.

Before nine in the morning we had taken possession of the heights overlooking the valley, and from the peak opened fire with rifles upon the enemy encamped outside the town. As soon as we showed ourselves a unit of 100 men tried to outflank us on our right, but in vain because our movements made them abandon their enterprise. They then changed plan and took the heights that were to our left, from whence they were dislodged violently and to their great cost.

Meanwhile my center, under the command of Colonel Francisco José Ribas sustained a terrible barrage on the enemy, who defended with a blind obstinacy, yielding ground inch by inch forcing them to change their positions constantly and which they held with the bulk of their troops and all their artillery and cavalry. Seeing that our soldiers were fighting much more fervently when danger was higher, I ordered Colonel Rivas and the rest of the troops to start the attack on the town and encampment.

This was carried out despite the intense artillery and rifle fire raining down on us from all sides, advancing step by step; and tired after 4 hours battle, we entered with fixed bayonets as we had almost run out of cavalry ammunition.

At that moment the enemy was seized with panic-stricken horror, and fled hastily, yielding to us their positions, artillery, equipment, guns, victuals and a number of effects pertaining to the Spanish government and their accomplices.

We have achieved an utterly complete victory, handing us their fortifications and these flower-covered valleys that they had enslaved, killing or wounding a multitude of soldiers and officers, including their leader Correa himself who had left the battlefield with a serious head wound, whilst we suffered such disproportionate losses that we need only lament two dead and 14 wounded, including citizen Concha, valiant Lieutenant of the Union troops. All our soldiers and officers have covered themselves with glory, but most particularly Colonel Rivas, who led all the troops from the front and to whom the country owes this day a great part of its triumph; equally outstanding were Major Narvárez, Captain Vidal, commander of the rearguard; Captain Lino Ramirez, commander of the troops of Pamplona; the commander of vanguard, brave citizen Pedro Guillen; Adjutant Ribón; and to avoid a long list I will say in a word that every soldier to the very last one has fulfilled his duty with honor. The enemy never managed to make us back down a single step, despite his advantages in artillery and cavalry and positions within the town".
