= Admirable Campaign =

1813 military campaign by Simón Bolívar to end the Spanish occupation of Venezuela

- Part of the Colombian War of Independence and the Venezuelan War of Independence
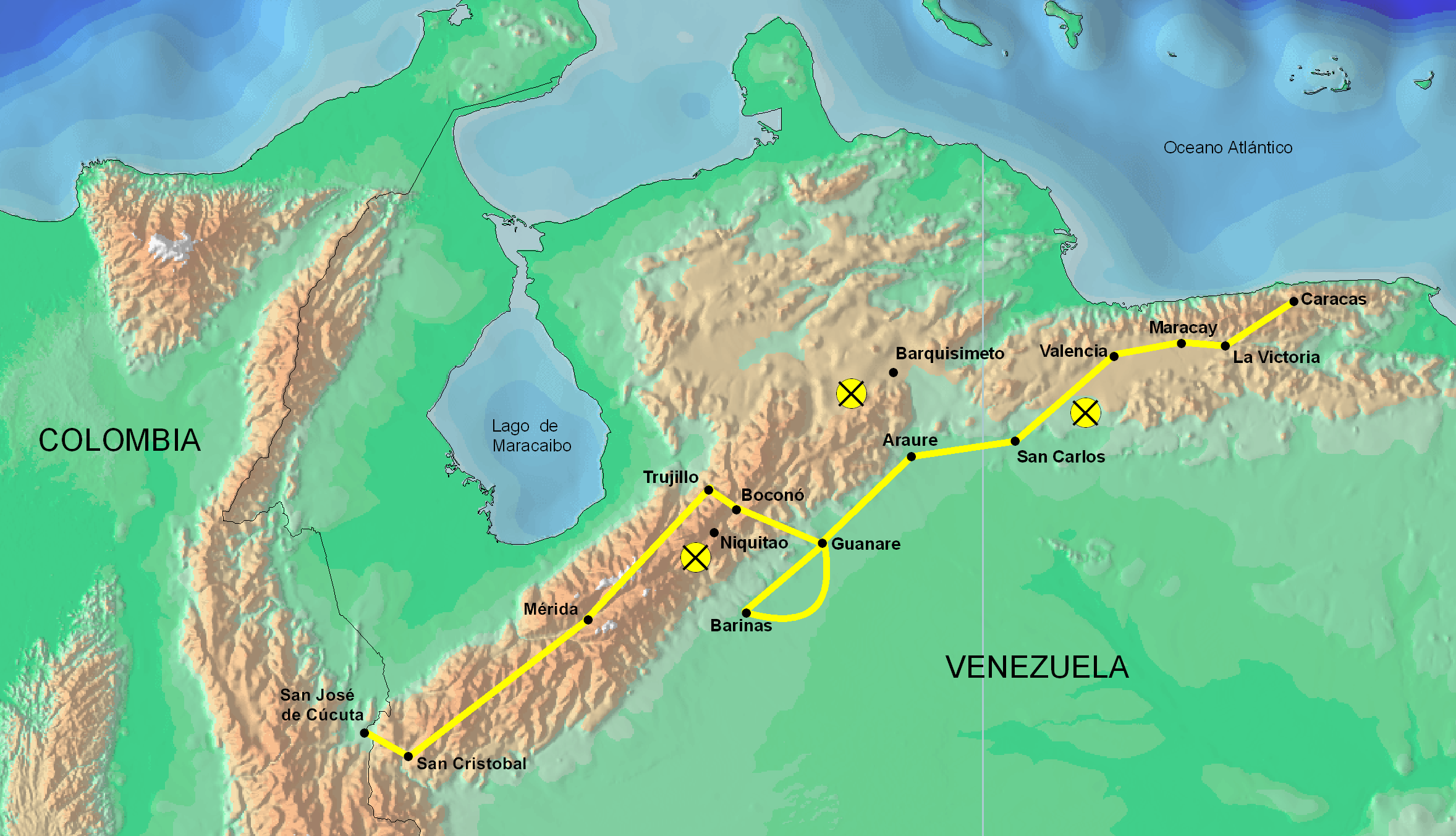
- Route of the Admirable Campaign
Date	14 May 1813 – 6 August 1813
Location	From Cúcuta, New Granada, through western and central Venezuela to Caracas
Result	Republican victory: Republican forces capture Mérida, Trujillo, Barinas, Valencia and Caracas.; Restoration of republican control over substantial portions of western and central Venezuela.; Royalist forces retain Puerto Cabello, Coro, Maracaibo and Guayana.
Territorial changes	Republican forces recover the provinces of Mérida, Trujillo, Barinas and Caracas; establishment of the Second Republic of Venezuela

Belligerents
United Provinces of New Granada; State of Cartagena; Mompox contingents; 2nd, 4th and 5th Battalions of the Union; State of Cundinamarca; Cundinamarca expeditionary troops; Military and logistical support; Venezuelan republicans; Venezuelan republican officers and soldiers; Local volunteers from Mérida and other liberated districts	Kingdom of Spain and the Indies (the Spains); (Spain) Captaincy General of Venezuela; Spanish royalist regulars; Venezuelan royalist militias; Royalist provincial garrisons and detachments

Commanders and leaders
Political leadership Camilo Torres Tenorio (President of the Congress of the United Provinces); Manuel Rodríguez Torices (President of Cartagena; expedition sponsor); Antonio Nariño (President of Cundinamarca; military supporter); Antonio Ignacio Rodríguez Picón (Republican governor of Mérida; local supplier) Military command Simón Bolívar (Brigadier of the Union; commander-in-chief); Atanasio Girardot (Commander of the vanguard); José Félix Ribas (Commander of the rearguard division); Rafael Urdaneta (Major general of the expedition); Luciano D'Elhuyar (Second commander of the vanguard); Vicente Campo Elías (Commander of Mérida republican troops); Jacinto Lara (Republican field officer); Hermógenes Maza (Commander of the advance guard); José Tejada (Chief of artillery) José María Ricaurte (Vanguard officer)	Political leadership Ferdinand VII (Recognized monarch; in captivity); Luis María de Borbón y Vallabriga (President of the Spanish Regency, 1813) Royalist military command Domingo de Monteverde (Captain General of Venezuela; overall royalist commander); Antonio Tíscar y Pedrosa (Royalist governor and commander in Barinas); Julián Izquierdo (Royalist field commander at Taguanes); José Martí (Royalist commander at Niquitao); Francisco Oberto (Royalist commander at Los Horcones); Manuel Cañas (Royalist commander at Agua de Obispos); Ramón Correa (Royalist commander in the Cúcuta and Trujillo sectors) Pedro González de Fuentes (Royalist field officer at Los Horcones)

Units involved
2nd, 4th and 5th Battalions of the Union (vanguard); Troops from Cundinamarca and Cartagena	

Strength
Approximately 600 troops supplied by the Congress of New Granada; additional forces joined during the campaign	

The Admirable Campaign (Spanish: Campaña Admirable) was a military expedition conducted by the United Provinces of New Granada and allied venezuelan republican forces against spanish royalist control in western and central Venezuela between 14 of May and 6 of August 1813, during the Spanish American wars of Independence, Colombian war of Independence and Venezuelan war of Independence.

The campaign was led by Simón Bolívar, a venezuelan-born officer serving as brigadier in the New Granadan army, with military and logistical support from the United Provinces of New Granada and the Free and Independent State of Cundinamarca.

Its combined forces included mostly New Granadan troops, Venezuelan republican officers and locally recruited volunteers.

== Overview ==
After the collapse of the First Republic of Venezuela in 1812, Simón Bolívar sought refuge in the Provinces of New Granada led by Camilo Torres Tenorio where he entered the service of the patriot army, later called ejército libertador or Liberator army. At the time, the new granadan provinces were engaged in internal conflicts with territories that refused to recognize the authority of the federal government, particularly the centralist Free and Independent State of Cundinamarca. On January 28, 1813, Bolívar captured Ocaña, a city which was on the main roads to Venezuela. The expedition was formed by two divisions, a vanguard led by Colonel Atanasio Girardot and a rear under Colonel José Félix Ribas. At the same time Domingo de Monteverde was moving troops to western Venezuela in preparation for an invasion of New Granada, threatening the newly independent states there.

From Ocaña Bolívar moved against royalist areas of New Granada, taking the border city of Cúcuta in the Battle of Cúcuta on February 28. Here, Bolivar asked United Provinces for aid and permission to enter Venezuela through a document named the "Cartagena Manifesto" (Spanish: Manifiesto de Cartagena). The United Provinces regarded his petition favourably taking into consideration the numerous actions that he executed for the Neogranadan government. As soon as government authorization was given, the campaign started its march into Venezuela on February 16. The expedition marched through San Cristóbal, La Grita, Mérida and Trujillo. It is from this city that Bolívar issued his "Decree of War to the Death." In the Decree Bolivar announced that the patriot army will treat Spaniards and Criollos differently: "Spaniards and Canarians, you can expect death, even if uninvolved, if you do not actively work in favor of the independence of America. Americans, count on life, even if guilty." The Decree would remain in force, technically, until the treaty signed with Pablo Morillo at Santa Ana de Trujillo on November 26, 1820, regularized the rules of engagement.

The last major engagement of the campaign was the Battle of Los Horcones on July 22. After that the expedition occupied the cities of Valencia and La Victoria in early August. Losing on two fronts, the royalist government surrendered on August 4.

Bolívar's forces had a triumphal entrance into the city of Caracas on August 6, bringing an end to the campaign and reestablishing the Venezuelan republic.

== See also ==
- United Provinces of New Granada
- Cúcuta
- Camilo Torres Tenorio
- Nevado, the mucuchies puppy gift to Simon Bolivar, from the Admirable Campaign.
- Military career of Simón Bolívar
