= Colombian Civil War (1860–1862) =

Internal conflict

- Part of the Colombian Civil Wars
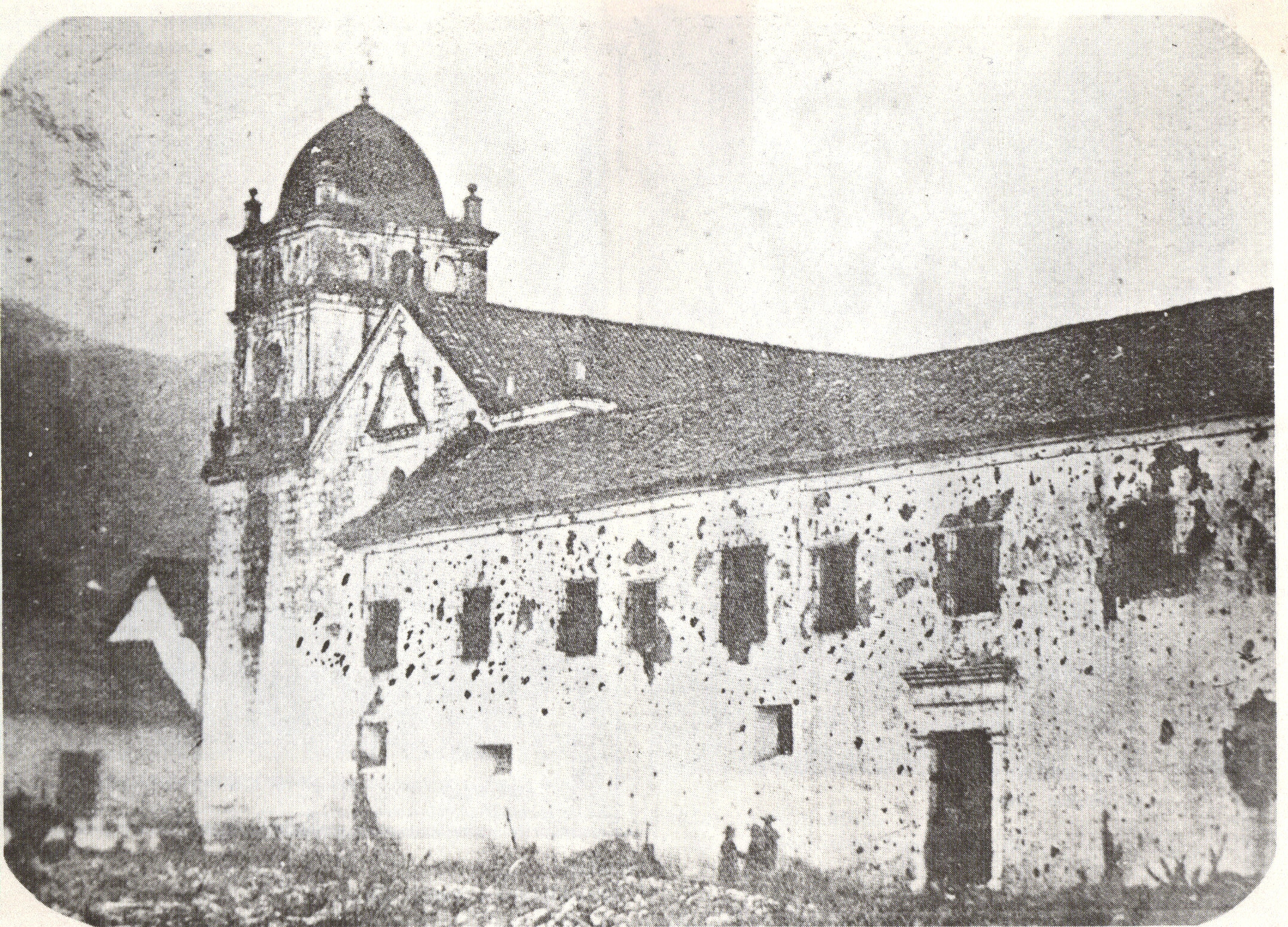
- Church of San Agustín after the capture of Bogotá by General Mosquera
Date	May 8, 1860 – November 1862
Location	Colombia
Result	Victory for Tomás Cipriano de Mosquera, formation of the United States of Colombia
Territorial changes	Granadine Confederation becomes United States of Colombia

Belligerents
Granadine Confederation; Colombian Conservative Party Federal states: Antioquia; Cundinamarca; Pasto; Quindio; Panamá	United States of New Granada; Colombian Liberal Party Federal states: Cauca; Santander; Boyaca; Magdalena; Tolima

Commanders and leaders
Mariano Ospina Rodríguez; Bartolomé Calvo; Joaquín París; Pedro Alcántara Herrán; Julio Arboleda†; Braulio Henao Duque; Leonardo Canal; Pedro Gutiérrez Lee†; Rafael María Giraldo Zuluaga†	Tomás Cipriano de Mosquera; José María Obando†; José Hilario López; Juan José Nieto Gil; Santos Gutiérrez; Eustorgio Salgar; Santos Acosta; Pascual Bravo†

Strength
40,000	10,000

Casualties and losses
15,000	4,000

The Colombian Civil War began on 8 May 1860 and lasted until November 1862. It was an internal conflict between the newly formed conservative Granadine Confederation and a more liberal rebel force from the newly seceded region of Cauca, composed of dissatisfied politicians commanded by General Tomás Cipriano de Mosquera, its former president. The Granadine Confederation, created a few years earlier in 1858 by Mariano Ospina Rodríguez, was defeated in the capital Bogotá, with Mosquera deposing the newly elected president Bartolomé Calvo on July 18, 1861. Forming a provisional government, with himself as president, Mosquera continued to pursue the conservative forces until their final defeat in 1862. The resulting formation of the new United States of Colombia would have significant cultural and economic consequences for Colombia.

== Background ==
The Granadine Confederation was formed in 1858 out of the Republic of the New Granada; however, during the last few years of the previous Republic, there had been a call for more autonomy from various member states of Colombia, such as Azuero, Chiriquí Province, Panamá and Veraguas. In order to satisfy the member states and avoid a repeat of past mistakes that had led to Venezuela and Ecuador leaving the previous union during the formation of the Granadine Confederation, the central government created a number of sovereign states from the different regions of Colombia :

1. Antioquía :The Province of Antioquía became the Sovereign State of Antioquía,
2. Bolívar :The Sovereign State of Bolívar, which included the province of Cartagena,
3. Boyacá :The Sovereign State of Boyacá, which included the provinces of Tunja, Tundama, Casanare, and the cantons of Chiquinquirá and Vélez.
4. Cauca :The Sovereign State of Cauca, which included the provinces of Buenaventura, Chocó, Pasto and Popayán and the region of Caquetá.
5. Cundinamarca :The Sovereign State of Cundinamarca, which included the province of Mariquita, Bogotá, Neiva,
6. Magdalena :The Sovereign State of Magdalena, which included the provinces of El Banco, Padilla, Santa Marta, Tenerife and Valledupar.
7. Panamá :The Sovereign State of Panamá, which included the provinces of Azuero, Chiriquí Province, Panamá and Veraguas.
8. Santander :The Sovereign State of Santander, which included the provinces of Socorro and Pamplona, was created May 13, 1857.
9. Tolima :The Sovereign State of Tolima, which included the provinces of Neiva and Mariquita.

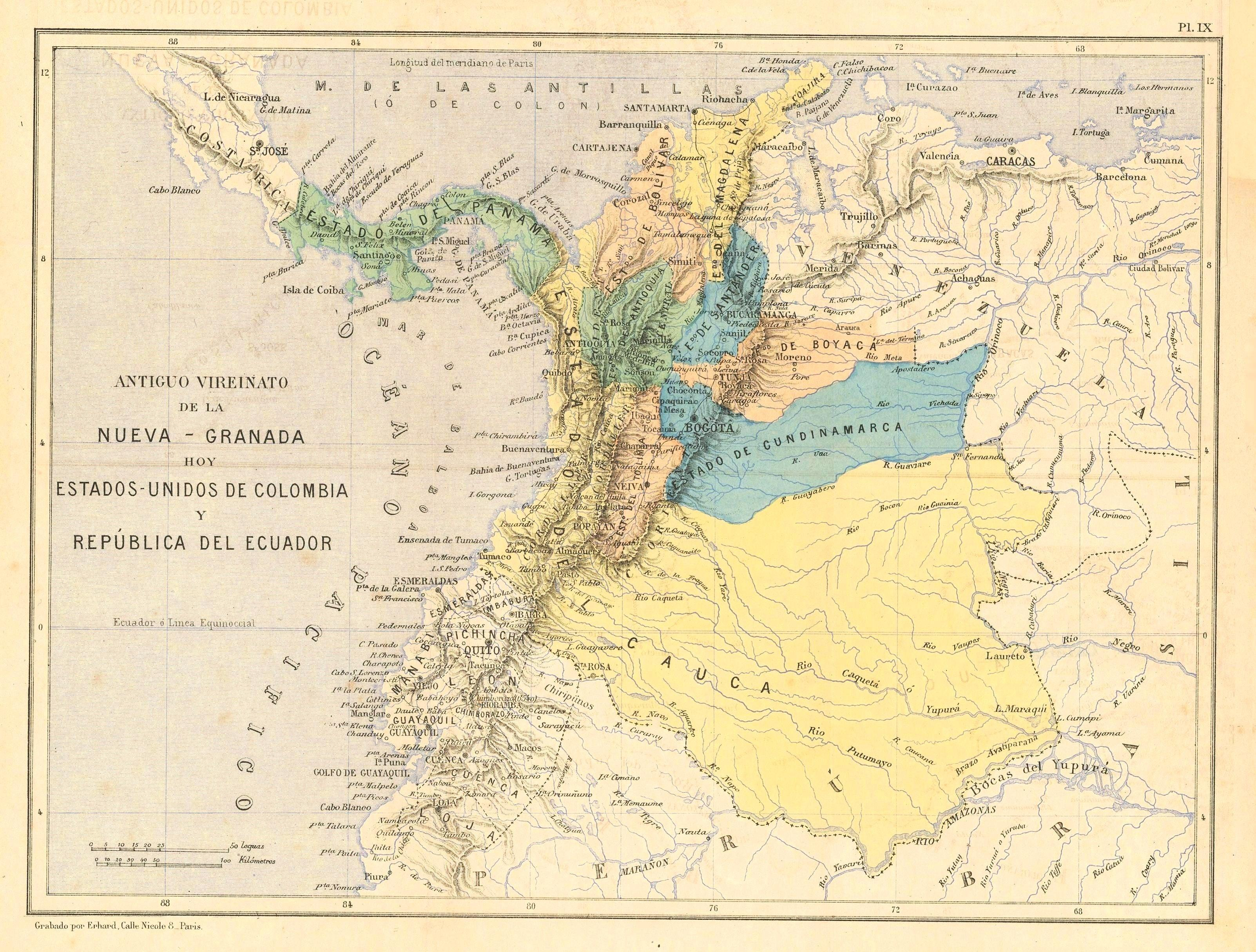
The Nine Sovereign States

Thus, by the time of the formation of the Granadine Confederation, Colombia consisted of a number of sovereign states, governed by the Congress of Colombia as the office of vice presidency was abolished. Despite the creation of these states, the government under Mariano Ospina Rodríguez became centralist, contrary to the wishes of the States who wanted more power and autonomy, thus increasing the levels of friction between the two levels of government.

On April 8, 1859, the congress of the Granadine Confederation awarded to the president the power to remove the governors of the member states, and on May 10, 1859, it created a second law that allowed the president direct control of the resources and governments of the member states through the creation of a number of administrative departments.
Among many angered by these laws was respected and popular politician, leader of the Granada Liberal Party, Tomás Cipriano de Mosquera, who denounced the laws as unconstitutional and rallied Liberal support. On May 8, 1860, the newly appointed Supreme Director of War Mosquera declared the Sovereign State of Cauca a separate nation from the Granadine Confederation and civil war broke out.

== Response of the Granadine Confederation ==
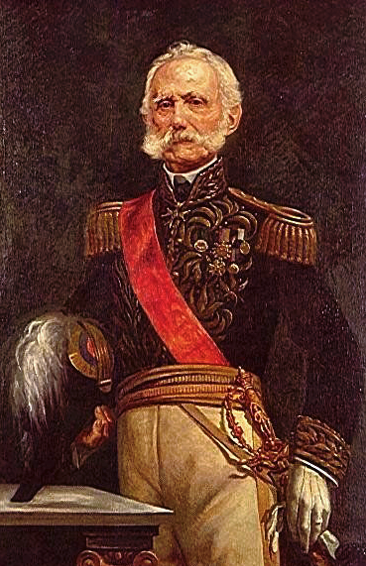
Tomas Cipriano de Mosquera who started the revolution

In the years prior to the outbreak of civil war, the central government under Mariano Ospina Rodríguez had attempted to thwart growing Liberal movements by supporting counter-insurrections in the member states. Most notable of these was Eustorgio Salgar and the State of Santander in 1859. Salgar and politician Aquileo Parra were both captured by the army of the centralised government after Santander sided against the centralised government on the outbreak of the civil war, however the unrest continued to spread to other regions of the country, including Bolívar and Antioquía, which extended down to the River Chinchiná near Manizales. Salgar, who would later go on to become president of Colombia, was released in 1861.

== Progress of the war ==
On August 28, 1860, the rebel army marched on Manizales and united with various leaders from the other sovereign states that supported Mosquera. On August 29, an agreement was formed that would result in Mosquera and his forces retiring to Cauca and disbanding, with Mosquera being granted the position of President of the Granadine Confederacy in return. Ospina, however, declined to ratify the proposed agreement and the liberal forces resumed the war. Following a successful invasion of the region of Antioquia by the rebel army, the capital Bogotá fell to them on July 18, 1861. Mariano Ospina Rodriguez, his brother Pastor, Bartolomé Calvo and his cabinet were taken prisoner.

The following day, Mosquera ordered the execution of a number of politicians and officials from the Confederacy, including Plácido Morales, Andrés Aguilar and Ambrosio Hernández. Following the collapse of the Confederacy government and the assumption of power by Mosquera, a number of renegade generals in command of the remaining Confederate forces continued to resist, including Julio Arboleda in the Cauca, General Braulio Henao in Antioquia and General Leonardo Canal in Santander, however with the assassination of the first on November 12, 1862, the defeat of Henao at the battle of Santa Barbara, and the capitulation of Canal in Pasto, Nariño, resistance to Mosquera's new government was relatively short lived, and on May 8, 1863, the United States of Colombia was officially created from the Rionegro Convention.

== Consequences of the war ==
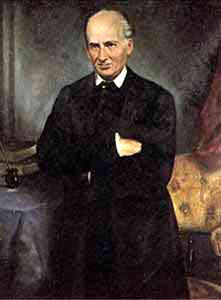
President of the Granadine Confederacy Mariano Ospina Rodríguez

Aside from the fall of the Granadine Confederation and the formation of the United States of Colombia, which would itself eventually fall during a civil war which saw the founding of the modern day Republic of Colombia in 1886, Tomás Cipriano de Mosquera's assumption of power in 1861 also had a profound social and economic impact on Colombia. Fearing the strength of Mosquera's power, other political leaders in Colombia worked to avoid a repeat of what Mosquera had done with the conservative government, by strengthening a federal government based on a laissez-faire policy, in which the regional and local autonomy were protected and there was no National Army, with new rules and powers given to the nine Sovereign States and their Presidents.

The new government also clashed with the positions of the church when, to help rejuvenate an economy ravaged by civil war, was put under secular control with its lands being sold to industrialists and developers. The government confiscated the property of religious communities and organizations such as schools, hospitals, monasteries, churches, land, houses and other properties that could be sold.
