= States of Colombia =

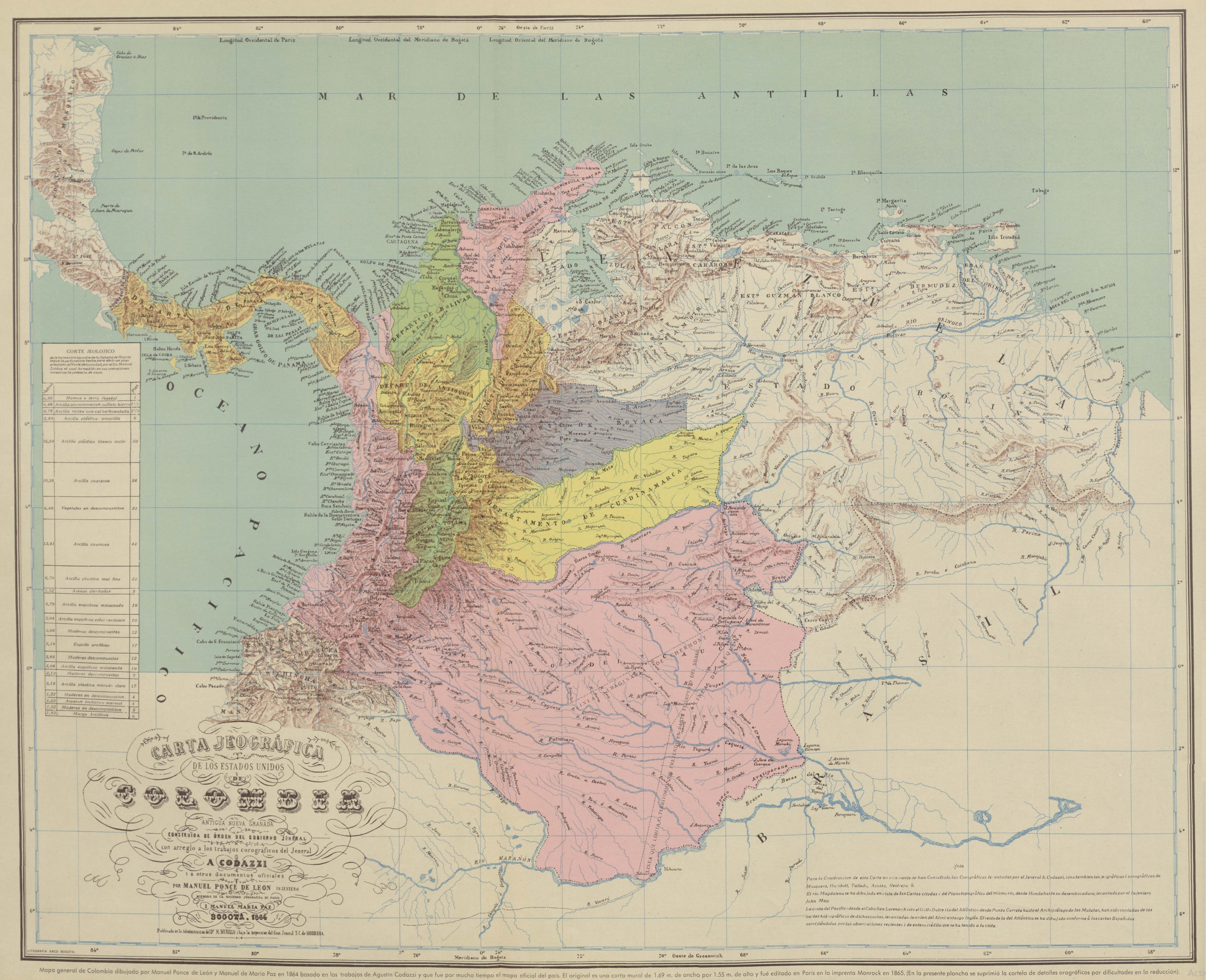
The Nine Sovereign States

States of Colombia existed from February 27, 1855, in the Republic of New Granada and the Granadine Confederation, where they were called "federal states". In the United States of Colombia they were called "sovereign states" (though they were not at all sovereign states in the modern sense of the word).

In 1886, Colombia was reorganized into a unitary republic (i.e. present-day Republic of Colombia), by abolishing the states and dividing the country into somewhat less autonomous departments with their own departmental governments; some of which were modelled after former states.

== Republic of New Granada ==
The centralist structure that came to be in the Republic of New Granada after the disestablishment of Gran Colombia and that was ratified by the constitution of 1843, was soon challenged; particularly the provinces of Azuero, Chiriquí, Panamá, and Veraguas, who were demanding an autonomous status. The Constitution of 1853 opened the way so that on February 27, 1855 the State of Panamá could be created within the Republic of New Granada.

Soon others followed suit, regionalism was too strong, and in order to prevent a breakup like the one Greater Colombia had, with Venezuela and Ecuador leaving the union, congress allowed the creation of other federal states:

- The Federal State of Antioquia was created from Antioquia Province on June 11, 1856.
- The Federal State of Santander, which included the provinces of Socorro and Pamplona, was created May 13, 1857.

The Law of June 15, 1857, created the other states that would go on to form the Granadine Confederation:

- The Federal State of Bolívar (Estado Federal de Bolívar), which included the Cartagena Province.
- The Federal State of Boyacá (Estado Federal de Boyacá), which included the provinces of Tunja, Tundama, Casanare, and the cantons of Chiquinquirá and Vélez.
- The Federal State of Cauca (Estado Federal de Cauca), which included the provinces of Buenaventura, Chocó, Pasto and Popayán and the Caquetá Territory.
- The Federal State of Cundinamarca (Estado Federal de Cundinamarca), which included the provinces of Mariquita, Bogotá and Neiva.
- The Federal State of Magdalena (Estado Federal de Magdalena), which included the provinces of El Banco, Padilla, Santa Marta, Tenerife and Valledupar.

The nation was formed by the union of these Sovereign States which were confederated in perpetuity to form a Sovereign Nation, free and independent under the name of the “Granadine Confederation”.

== Granadine Confederation ==
In 1858 the new constituency, made up in its majority of conservatives, convened and signed the Constitution for the Granadine Confederation of 1858, confirming Bogotá as its Federal Capital.

On July 12, 1861, after raising in arms against the constitutional government of the president Mariano Ospina Rodríguez, the general Tomas Cipriano de Mosquera created the Tolima State, carved out of Cundinamarca State. This was confirmed and legalized by the rest of the states of the Colombian Union, by means of Article 41 of the Pact of the Union on September 20, 1861, reaffirming the legality of the institutionalism of Tolima

== United States of Colombia (1863–1886) ==
Political divisions of the United States of Colombia in 1870.

The United States of Colombia was divided into nine federal states, called "sovereign states" under the constitution of 1863. The internal territorial division of the states were defined by the legislature of each state. The states were as follows:

States of the United States of Colombia
State	Capital	Subdivision
Antioquia	Medellín	Departments
Bolívar	Cartagena de Indias	Provinces
Boyacá	Tunja	Departments
Cauca	Popayán	Municipalities
Cundinamarca	Bogotá	Departments
Magdalena	Santa Marta	Departments
Panamá	Panamá	Departments
Santander	Pamplona, Bucaramanga, El Socorro	Departments
Tolima	Purificación, Neiva, Natagaima, Guamo, Ibagué	Departments

The capitals of Santander and Tolima changed several times.

== Republic of Colombia ==
The Colombian Constitution of 1886 converted the states into departments, the presidents became renamed as governors.
