= Santander State =

Former state of Colombia

Coordinates: 6.53333°N 73.2°W

1863 Santander State

Santander State was one of the states of Colombia, which existed from 1857 until 1886. Today the area of the former state makes up most of modern-day areas of the Santander Department and Norte de Santander Department in northeastern Colombia.

== Limits ==
In 1863 it bordered:

- Antioquia State in the West.
- Boyacá State in the South.
- Bolívar State and Magdalena State in the North.

== Naming ==
- 1857-05-13 : created as Estado Federal de Santander (Federal State of Santander).
- 1858 recognized as Estado de la Federación in the constitution of the Granadine Confederation,
- 1863 name Estado Soberano (Sovereign State of Santander) in the constitution of the United States of Colombia

== Subdivisions ==
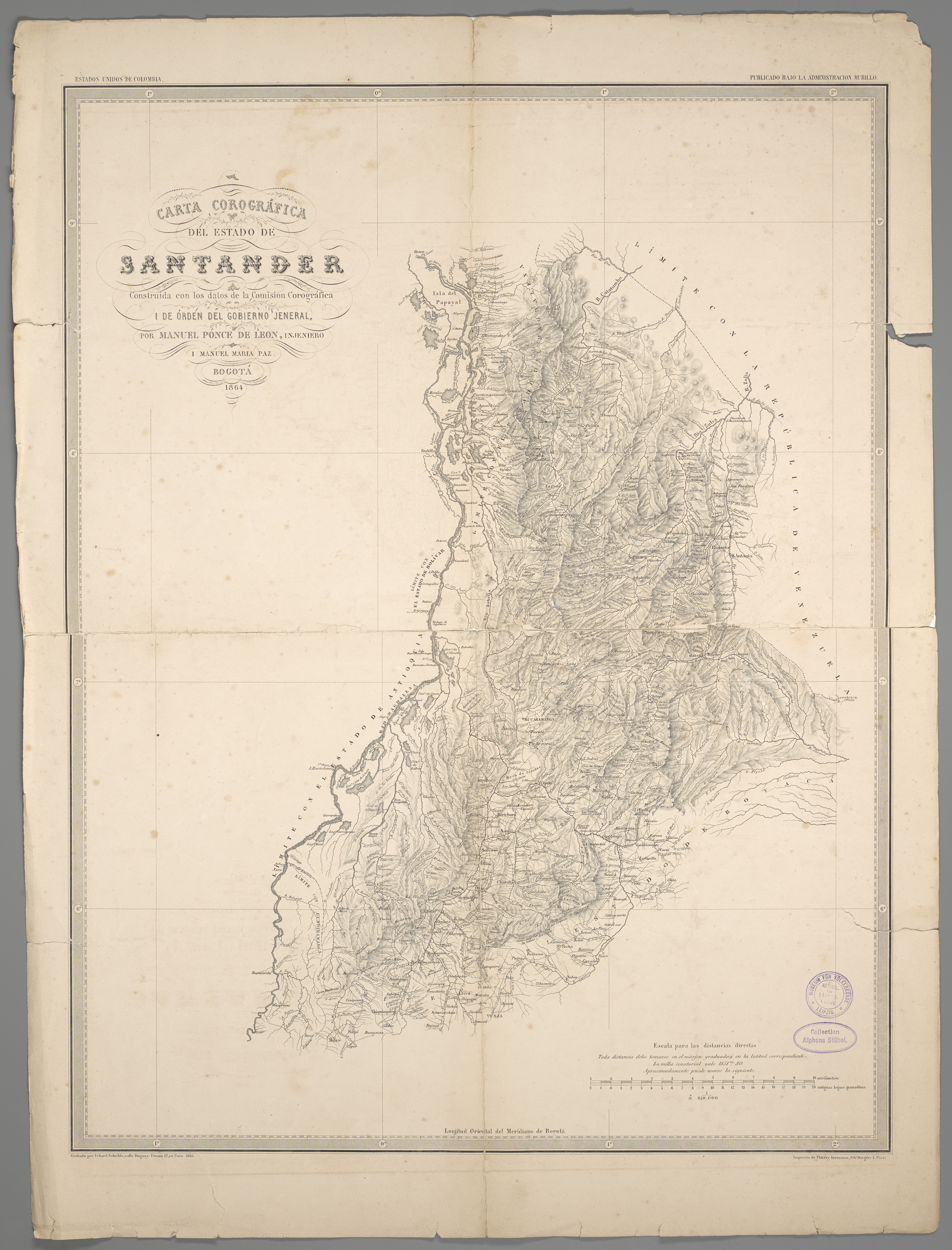
Sovereign State of Santander.

In 1857 the state was divided into the following departamentos:

- Barichara.
- Bucaramanga.
- Charalá.
- Fortul.
- Ocaña.
- Pamplona.
- San Gil.
- Socorro.
- Vélez.

The law of 17 April 1859 divided the state into 7 departamentos:

- Róvira Department (capital Concepción).
- Ocaña Department (capital Ocaña).
- Pamplona Department (capital Pamplona).
- Santander Department (capital San José de Cúcuta).
- Socorro Department (capital Socorro).
- Soto Department (capital Bucaramanga).

In 1860 two more departamentos were created:

- Guanentá Department (capital San Gil).
- Charalá Department (capital Charalá).

== See also ==
- Colombian Civil War (1860-1862)
