= Adolfo Mario Amador Fernández =

Colombian military officer, politician, jurist and diplomat

Adolfo Mario Amador

Senator of the United States of Colombia for Antioquia State
- In office 1884–1885

Personal details
- Born: 23 January 1844; Medellín, Republic of New Granada
- Died: 5 February 1885 Honda, Tolima, United States of Colombia
- Party: Colombian Liberal Party
- Spouse: Ana María Orbegozo Ruiz
- Children: 4
- Parent(s): José Sebastián Amador López, María Ignacia Fernández Callejas
- Occupation: Politician, Military Officer, Jurist, Diplomat

Adolfo Mario Amador Fernández (23 January 1844, in Medellín – 5 February 1885, in Honda) was a Colombian military officer, politician, jurist and diplomat.

== Life ==
The son of the businessman, native of Cartagena, José Sebastián Amador López, who served as Governor of Antioquia Province, and the antioquean María Ignacia Fernández Callejas, Amador Fernández was born in Medellín in 1844. He also was the brother of the famous businessman Carlos Coriolano Amador Fernández.

At a young age, he joined the Colombian National Army, reaching the rank of General in 1877. A Colombian Liberal Party member, in the 1860's he was Governor of Chocontá Department and in 1884 he was elected Senator for the Antioquia State, serving also as Member of the Chamber of Representatives for the same state. Also served as deputy to the Antioquia State Assembly and Political Chief of Medellín.

As diplomat, he served as Consul of Colombia in Denmark, and worked at the Colombian embassies in the United States and France. In his last years, joined to the High Court of Auditors (Spanish: Tribunal Superior de Cuentas) and served as Attorney General of the Cundinamarca State and as General Secretary of the Cundinamarca State Assembly.

Amador was killed in action during the Colombian Civil War of 1884-1885.
