= San Martín Territory =

Coordinates: 3°41′N 73°41′W

The territory in 1855 within the Republic of New Granada

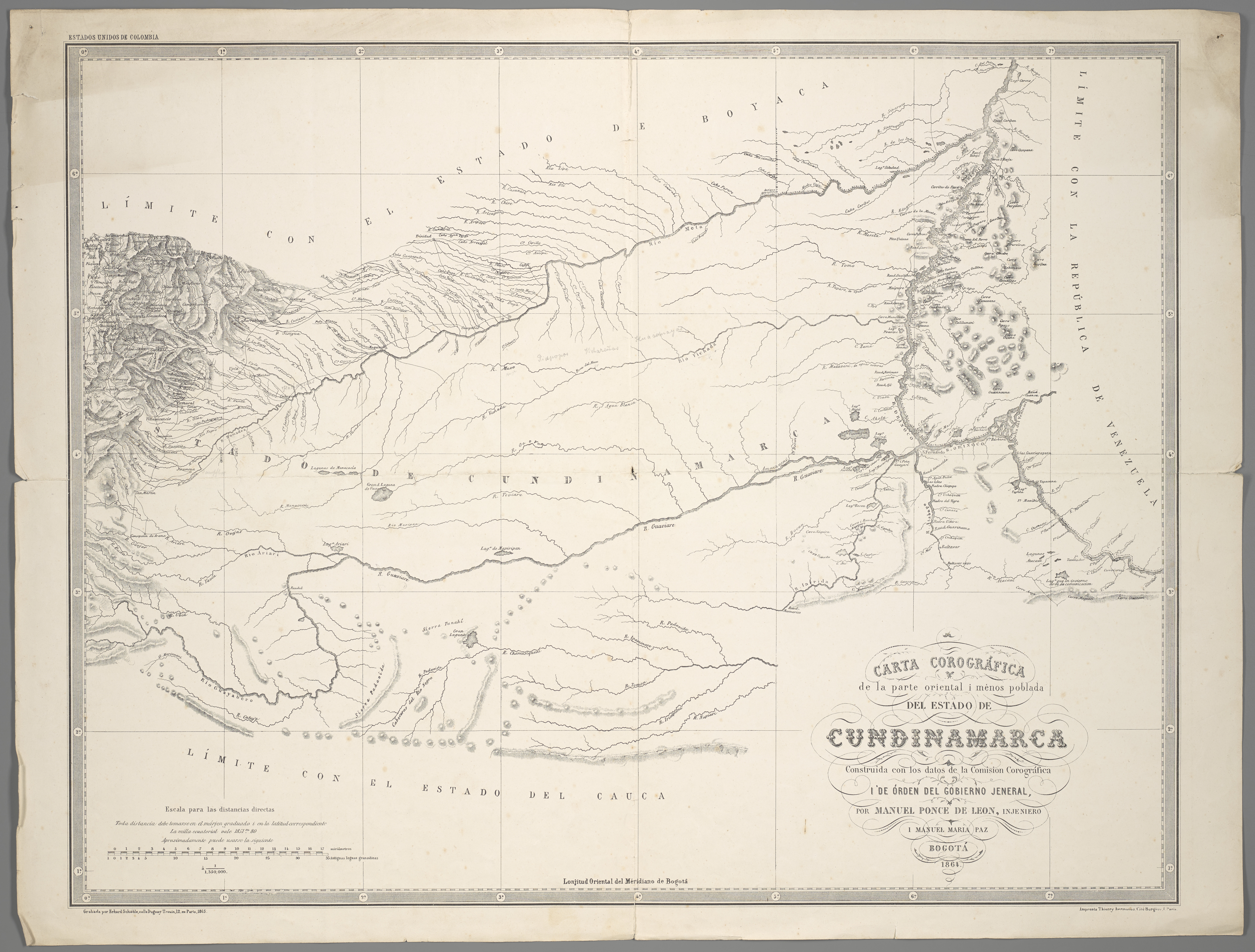
An 1865 map of the territory.

The San Martín Territory (Spanish: Territorio de San Martín) was a national territory of the Republic of New Granada (1846–1856) and the United States of Colombia (1866–1886) created on June 2, 1846. The capital was San Martín.

In the South it bordered the Caquetá Territory.

== Timeline ==
- 1832 part of Bogotá Province as San Martín Territory.
- 1844 part of Cundinamarca State as San Martín Territory.
- 1856 part of Bogotá Province as the San Martín Canton.
- 1863 part of Cundinamarca State as San Martín Territory.
- 1867 Cundinamarca cedes all rights over the territory to the Union
- 1875 it is named Meta Province
- 1886 as Oriente Province part of Cundinamarca Department
- 1906 Meta National Territory
- 1909 Meta National Intendency
- 1959 Meta Department

== See also ==
- Meta Department
- Meta Province
- San Martín de los Llanos
