= Bogotá Province =

Coordinates: 4.5833°N 74.0667°W

Santafé de Bogotá
- Province of Gran Colombia and later of Republic of New Granada
- 1550–1857
- Location of the province of Santafé de Bogotá in New Granada around 1810

- Location of the province in New Granada around 1855
- Capital: Santa Fe de Bogotá
- Demonym: Bogotan(o/a), Santafereñ(o/a), Neogranadin(o/a)
- Area
  - 1820: 215,627 km^{2} (83,254 sq mi)
- Population
  - 1789: 119,779
  - 1820: 172,000
  - 1835: 255,569
  - 1843: 279,032
  - 1851: 317,351
  - Type: Governorate
- Historical era: Spanish colonization of the Americas; Colombian War of Independence
  - Established: 1550
  - Establishment: July 17, 1550
  - Dissolution: June 15, 1875
  - Disestablished: 1857
Preceded by
New Kingdom of Granada
Free and Independent State of Cundinamarca
Succeeded by
Free and Independent State of Cundinamarca
Cundinamarca Department (1824)
San Martín Territory
Cundinamarca Province
Tequendama Province (New Granada)
Zipaquirá Province
Cundinamarca State

The province of Santafé de Bogotá, also known as the government of Santafé during the Spanish imperial era, was originally an administrative and territorial entity of the New Kingdom of Granada. It was created on July 17, 1550, at which point New Granada was a province within the Viceroyalty of Peru. In 1717, province became part of Viceroyalty of New Granada after King Philip V of Spain issued a real cédula creating the new viceroyalty.

During the Spanish American wars of independence (1810–1816), parts of New Granada (including Santafé de Bogotá) declared independence as the Free and Independent State of Cundinamarca. Ideological and political differences between the various Granadian provinces gave rise to the first Colombian civil war. This period is known in Colombia as La Patria Boba (lit. 'the Foolish Fatherland'). At the end of the war, Bogotá was incorporated into the United Provinces of New Granada.

After the close of the Colombian War of Independence, the province of Bogotá became a territory of the first Republic of Colombia within the Cundinamarca Department. After the dissolution of Gran Colombia in 1830, Bogotá came under the control of the Republic of New Granada. When the (originally unitary) republic adopted a federal system, the province (along with Mariquita, Neiva, and San Martín) was designated the Sovereign State of Cundinamarca in 1857.

In modern times, the region is the location of the city of Bogotá located high in the Andes at 2,620 metres (8,600 ft).

== History ==
=== Pre-Columbian history ===
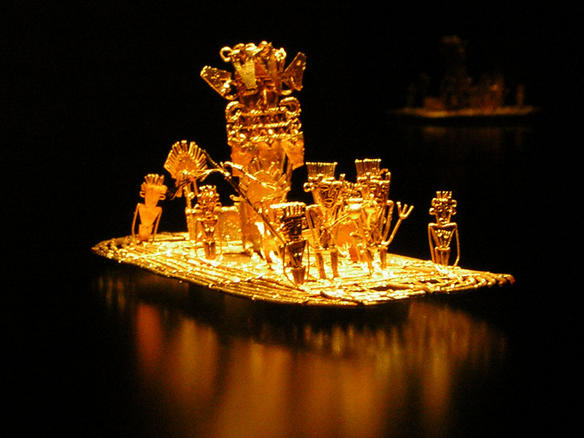
Muisca goldsmith representation of the Zipa making offerings to the goddess of Lake Guatavita. The Zipa would be covered in gold for the actual ritual. This artifact is held in the Gold Museum of Bogotá.

Multiple indigenous societies lived in the area of the province before the arrival of the Spanish conquistadors, including the Muiscas, Panches, and Pijaos. These groups had established complex trade networks with the inhabitants of the Cordillera Central and Cordillera Oriental (the central and eastern ranges of the Colombian Andes respectively).

In 1536, the conquistador Gonzalo Jiménez de Quesada led an expedition out of Santa Marta to explore the interior of New Granada. The expedition defeated the Muisca Confederation and colonized a vast area along the course of the Magdalena River in the interior of the Colombian Andes. By 1538, the expedition had founded the city of Santa Fe de Bogotá (present-day Bogotá). De Quesada named the entire colonized region the New Kingdom of Granada, in homage to the Kingdom of Granada that had existed until 1492 in what is now southern Spain.

=== Spanish rule ===
Emperor Charles I issued a real cédula in July 27, 1540 elevating the settlement of Santafé to the category of city, thereby granting it the authority to establish its own jurisdiction. The same decree also bestowed upon the city the coat of arms it bears to this day.

=== Independence ===
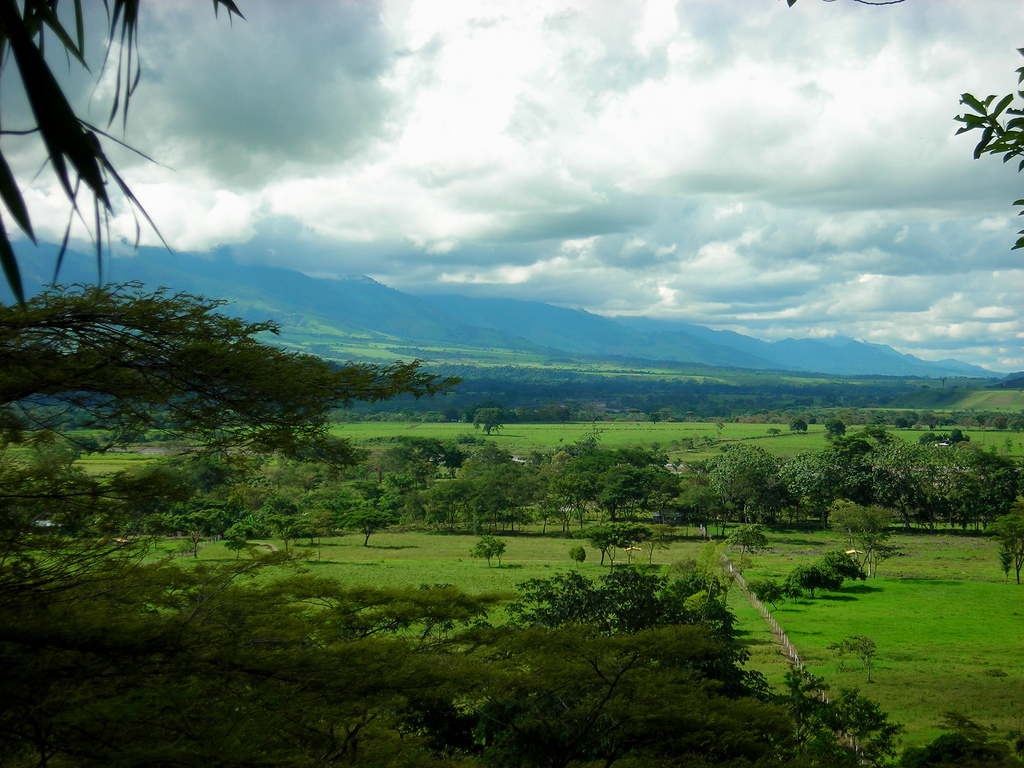
The plains of the Orinoco.

=== Republican era ===
On December 17, 1819, the Congress of Angostura issued the Fundamental Law that created the Republic of Colombia. The law united New Granada and Venezuela, dividing the new republic into three departments: Cundinamarca, Venezuela, and Quito. Santafé remained a province within the department of Cundinamarca. A few years later on July 12, 1821, the Congress of Cúcuta enacted the Constitution of Cúcuta. Based on the Fundamental Law from Angostura, this new document refined the territorial organization of the Republic. While it maintained the division of the Republic into departments and provinces, Santafé was officially renamed Bogotá.

Following the dissolution of Gran Colombia in 1830, the Constitution of 1832 was enacted. Under this constitution, the Republic of New Granada was subdivided into provinces (the same as in 1810), with the province of Bogotá corresponding approximately to the territories of the departments of Cundinamarca, Meta, and Vichada in modern day Colombia.

The Constitution of 1843 implemented a new division of the Republic of New Granada into provinces, which were further divided into cantons, and these into parochial districts. This division included twenty provinces, including Bogotá. However, Bogotá's territory was significantly reduced, as the eastern part became the Territory of San Martín, while the northern and southern areas were separated to create the provinces of Cundinamarca, Tequendama, and Zipaquirá.

When the conservatives returned to power in 1855, Congress approved the reunification of the provinces, but this time as federal states. The constitution of 1858 that created the Granadine Confederation defined eight federal states, including the Sovereign State of Cundinamarca. In 1861, the Sovereign State of Tolima was created from the provinces of Mariquita and Neiva, which until then had been part of Cundinamarca.

== Territorial evolution ==
Subdivisions of the Province of Santa Fe de Bogotá c. 1701
Province	Jurisdictions (in Spanish)		Partidos (in Spanish)	
Province	Type	Name	Type	Name
Province of Santa Fe	Jurisdicción de	Santa Fe	Jurisdicción de	Santa Fe
Province of Santa Fe	Jurisdicción de	Santa Fe	Corregimiento de	Bogotá
Province of Santa Fe	Jurisdicción de	Santa Fe	Corregimiento de	Bosa
Province of Santa Fe	Jurisdicción de	Santa Fe	Corregimiento de	Cáqueza
Province of Santa Fe	Jurisdicción de	Santa Fe	Corregimiento de	Guatavita
Province of Santa Fe	Jurisdicción de	Santa Fe	Corregimiento de	Ubaté
Province of Santa Fe	Jurisdicción de	Santa Fe	Corregimiento de	Zipaquirá
Province of Santa Fe	Jurisdicción de	Altagracia	Corregimiento de	Pasca
Province of Santa Fe	Jurisdicción de	Guaduas	Corregimiento de	Panches
Province of Santa Fe	Jurisdicción de	Llanos de San Juan	Jurisdicción de	Llanos de San Juan
Province of Santa Fe	Jurisdicción de	Llanos de San Martín	Jurisdicción de	Llanos de San Martín

Subdivisions of the Province of Santa Fe de Bogotá c. 1756
Province	Jurisdictions (in Spanish)		Partidos (in Spanish)	
Province	Type	Name	Type	Name
Province of Santa Fe	Jurisdicción de	Santa Fe	Jurisdicción de	Santa Fe
Province of Santa Fe	Jurisdicción de	Santa Fe	Corregimiento de	Bogotá
Province of Santa Fe	Jurisdicción de	Santa Fe	Corregimiento de	Bosa
Province of Santa Fe	Jurisdicción de	Santa Fe	Corregimiento de	Cáqueza
Province of Santa Fe	Jurisdicción de	Santa Fe	Corregimiento de	Guatavita
Province of Santa Fe	Corregimiento de	Zipaquirá	Corregimiento de	Ubaté
Province of Santa Fe	Corregimiento de	Zipaquirá	Corregimiento de	Zipaquirá
Province of Santa Fe	Jurisdicción de	Altagracia	Corregimiento de	Pasca
Province of Santa Fe	Jurisdicción de	Guaduas	Corregimiento de	Panches
Province of Santa Fe	Jurisdicción de	Llanos de San Juan	Jurisdicción de	Llanos de San Juan
Province of Santa Fe	Jurisdicción de	Llanos de San Martín	Jurisdicción de	Llanos de San Martín

Subdivisions of the Province of Santa Fe de Bogotá c. 1777
Province	Jurisdictions (in Spanish)		Partidos (in Spanish)	
Province	Type	Name	Type	Name
Province of Santa Fe	Jurisdicción de	Santa Fe	Jurisdicción de	Santa Fe
Province of Santa Fe	Jurisdicción de	Santa Fe	Corregimiento de	Bogotá
Province of Santa Fe	Jurisdicción de	Santa Fe	Corregimiento de	Bosa
Province of Santa Fe	Jurisdicción de	Santa Fe	Corregimiento de	Cáqueza
Province of Santa Fe	Jurisdicción de	Santa Fe	Corregimiento de	Chocontá
Province of Santa Fe	Corregimiento de	Zipaquirá	Corregimiento de	Ubaté
Province of Santa Fe	Corregimiento de	Zipaquirá	Corregimiento de	Zipaquirá
Province of Santa Fe	Jurisdicción de	Guaduas	Corregimiento de	Panches
Province of Santa Fe	Jurisdicción de	Llanos de San Martín	Corregimiento de	Medina
Province of Santa Fe	Jurisdicción de	Llanos de San Martín	Jurisdicción de	Llanos de San Juan
Province of Santa Fe	Jurisdicción de	Llanos de San Martín	Jurisdicción de	Llanos de San Martín
