= United States of Colombia =

1863–1886 state in South America

Coordinates: 4°39′N 74°03′W

United States of Colombia Estados Unidos de Colombia (Spanish)
- 1863–1886
- Flag Coat of arms

- Status: Federation
- Capital: Bogotá
- Religion: Roman Catholic
- Government: Federal presidential republic
- President
  - 1863–1864: Tomás Cipriano de Mosquera (first)
  - 1886: José María Campo Serrano (last)
- History
  - Established: 1863
  - Constitución de Rionegro: 8 May 1863
  - Disestablished: 1886

Area
  - Total: 1,331,250 km^{2} (514,000 sq mi)

Population
  - 1870: 2,681,637
- Currency: Peso
Preceded by	Succeeded by
Granadine Confederation	Republic of Colombia
- Today part of: Brazil; Colombia; Panama

The United States of Colombia (Spanish: Estados Unidos de Colombia) was the name adopted in 1863 by the Constitución de Rionegro for the Granadine Confederation, after years of civil war. Colombia became a federal state itself composed of nine "sovereign states." It comprised the present-day nations of Colombia and Panama and parts of northwestern Brazil. After several more years of intermittent civil wars, it was replaced by the more centralist Republic of Colombia in 1886, predecessor to modern Colombia.

== History ==
The civil war of 1860–1862 resulted in the dissolution of the Granadine Confederation which had been subjected increasingly to efforts by conservatives to centralize rule over the federal states. The liberal General Tomás Cipriano de Mosquera defeated the conservative government of President Bartolomé Calvo during 1862 and was installed as new president. Much power was distributed back to the states from the government in Bogotá.

Already in July 1861, when Mosquera had taken Bogotá and declared himself provisional president of the nation, one of his first acts was to rename the country United States of New Granada. This name was short-lived, as Mosquera changed the name again to United States of Colombia in November of the same year.

=== Colombian Constitution of 1863 ===
On 3 February 1863, Congress approved the name United States of Colombia for the country, and on 8 May, the Constitución de Rionegro was promulgated. It established a federal system with a central presidency with a term of two years and without the possibility of immediate re-election. The president was elected by the states. On 12 May, Mosquera was chosen to be the first president.

The liberals attempted to establish the United States of Colombia with a decentralized, free market system. As with previous liberal presidencies, such as Mosquera's first two terms as president, a tough policy towards the Catholic Church was taken, much to the dismay of conservatives. Land possessed by the Church was seized and transferred to industrialists and the influence and rights of the Church was limited severely.

During 1871, attempts at modernization and economic reform resulted in the Colombian peso being associated with the French franc as part of the international gold standard.

=== Abolition ===
After several years of intermittent civil wars, during 1886 the Colombian Conservative Party led by President Rafael Núñez proclaimed a new constitution of a unitary and centralist character that abolished the United States of Colombia and created the Republic of Colombia. The conservatives immediately withdrew Colombia from the gold standard and the subsequent increase of printed currency resulted in troubling inflation.

Meanwhile, the new state would continue to be plagued by conflict between liberal and conservative factions, which eventually would result in the secession of Panama during 1903.

Colombian states

== States and territories of the United States of Colombia ==
=== States of the United States of Colombia (1863–1886) ===
States of the United States of Colombia (1863–1886)
Name		Capital	Established		Population (1874)	Total area (1874)	
Name		Capital	State creation	Joined the US of Colombia	Population (1874)	mi^{2}	km^{2}
Antioquia	ANT	Medellín	June 11, 1856	May 8, 1863	365,974	22,780	59,000
Bolívar	BOL	Cartagena	June 15, 1857	May 8, 1863	241,704	27,027	70,000
Boyacá	BOY	Tunja	June 15, 1857	May 8, 1863	482,874	33,350	86,375
Cauca	CAU	Popayán	June 15, 1857	May 8, 1863	435,078	258,071	668,400
Cundinamarca	CUN	Bogotá	June 15, 1857	May 8, 1863	409,602	79,691	206,400
Magdalena	MAG	Santa Marta	June 15, 1857	May 8, 1863	85,275	25,846	66,941
Panamá	PAN	Panamá	February 27, 1855	May 8, 1863	221,052	33,282	86,200
Santander	SAN	Socorro	May 13, 1857	May 8, 1863	425,427	16,448	42,600
Tolima	TOL	Ibagué	April 12, 1861	May 8, 1863	230,891	18,417	47,700

=== Federal District of the United States of Colombia (1863–1886) ===
Federal District of the United States of Colombia (1863–1886)
Name		Capital	Established		Population (1851)	Total area (1862)	
Name		Capital	Creation	Suppression	Population (1851)	mi^{2}	km^{2}
Federal District	DF	Bogotá	July 23, 1861	May 11, 1864	29,649	3	8

=== Territories of the United States of Colombia (1863–1886) ===
Territories of the United States of Colombia (1863–1886)
Name	Capital	Under the jurisdiction of
Name	Capital	State
Bolívar	Landázuri	Santander
Caquetá	Mocoa	Cauca
Casanare	Tame	Boyacá
La Guajira	Riohacha	Magdalena
San Andrés	San Andrés	Bolívar
San Martín	San Martín	Cundinamarca
Sierra Nevada	Espíritu Santo	Magdalena
Vásquez	Puerto Reyes	Cundinamarca
