= Mompox =

Mompox may refer to:

- Santa Cruz de Mompox, a town in northern Colombia
- Mompox Province, a historical province of Colombia
