= Granadine Confederation =

1858–1863 federal state in Central and South America

Coordinates: 4°39′N 74°03′W

Granadine Confederation Confederación Granadina
- 1858–1863
- Flag Coat of arms
- Motto: Libertad y Orden (Spanish: Liberty and Order)
- Anthem: Al Veinte De Julio (Note: Referring to the 20 July Revolution.)
- Location of the Granadine Confederation
- Capital: Santafé de Bogotá
- Religion: Roman Catholic
- Demonym: Granadine
- Government: Federal presidential republic
- President
  - 1858–1861: Mariano Ospina Rodríguez
  - 1861: Bartolomé Calvo
  - 1861–1863: Tomás Cipriano de Mosquera
- History
  - New constitution: May 22 1858
  - Constitutional reform: 1853
  - Civil War: 1860
  - Rionegro Convention: May 8 1863
- Currency: Peso
Preceded by	Succeeded by
Republic of New Granada	United States of Colombia
- Today part of: Brazil; Colombia; Panama

The Granadine Confederation (Spanish: Confederación Granadina) was a short-lived federal republic established in 1858 as a result of a constitutional change replacing the Republic of New Granada. It consisted of the present-day nations of Colombia and Panama and parts of northwestern Brazil. In turn, the Granadine Confederation was replaced by the United States of Colombia after another constitutional change in 1863.

== History ==
The short but complicated life of the Granadine Confederation was marked by rivalry between the Conservative Party and the Liberal Party, which ended in a Civil War (1860–1862). It also was a period of hostility against the Roman Catholic Church, and of divided regionalism.

The Granadine Confederation was established by the Constitution of 1853, considered pro-federalist or centro-federalist because it gave more autonomy to the provinces, which multiplied to 35 provinces during the administration of Manuel María Mallarino (1855–1857), each with its own provincial constitution.

=== Background ===
Even though the majority of the mid-century reforms came from the Liberal Party, their beginnings can be traced to the last two administrations of the 1840s decade. In this sense, the government of Pedro Alcántara Herrán (1841–1845) and the first mandate of Tomás Cipriano de Mosquera (1845–1849) stood out for their modernizing tone, which included among other measures the compilation of Granadine laws, the liberation of trade, the reduction of import and export customs duties, the formation of normal schools for the instruction of teachers, the promotion of the Panama railroad, the control of ecclesiastical jurisdiction and freedom of the press.

All these measures opened the way for the deeper transformations that formally began with the arrival to power of the liberal José Hilario López in 1849. The change in the Government party, according to historian Frank Safford, was possible thanks to the division of the Conservative Party in the elections of 1848 between José Joaquín Cori and Rufino Cuervo, in addition to the mobilization of the artisan sector in support of the Liberal Party candidate. The reforms of this government included the abolition of slavery, the end of the death penalty, non-imprisonment for debts, universal suffrage for adult males was allowed and the consolidation of freedom of the press, worship, trade and education. Additionally measures were implemented to grant greater autonomy to regional governments, with the transfer of revenues and responsibilities that previously belonged to the central Government to the provinces, under the creation between 1849 and 1852 of thirteen new territorial entities, which —according to what was believed— could exercise a more effective government of the territory, in addition to guaranteeing the democratization of these spaces of the country. In this reformist environment José Hilario López, even against the refusal of several sectors of the Liberal Party, expelled the Society of Jesus from the national territory, whom he considered tools of the Conservative Party in the midst of the political struggle that was taking place at that moment.

This last measure, together with the abolition of slavery and the elimination of the civil and criminal ecclesiastical jurisdiction, motivated the first conservative uprising of the period in 1851.

On the other hand, the alliance that José Hilario López had forged with the artisans came to an end due to what the president considered as the danger generated by the excessive force that this guild had taken, and its tendency to use violence as an element of pressure on the Government and Congress so that they would grant them special protection measures. This change of perspective of López's Government led to the consolidation of another political figure, José María Obando, who reached the presidency in the elections of 1852 with the support of several sectors of liberalism and the artisans.

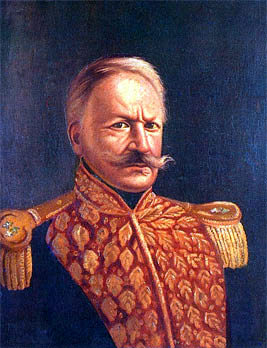
José María Obando del Campo.

Obando began his government in 1853, together with a new Constitution, which restricted presidential powers and expanded the autonomy of the provinces with respect to the central Government, in what was an evident prelude to the federal model. Likewise, it presented a marked liberal character in what refers to the creation of civil marriage and civil divorce, the proclamation of the separation of Church and State, the end of the death penalty and the reduction of the Army.

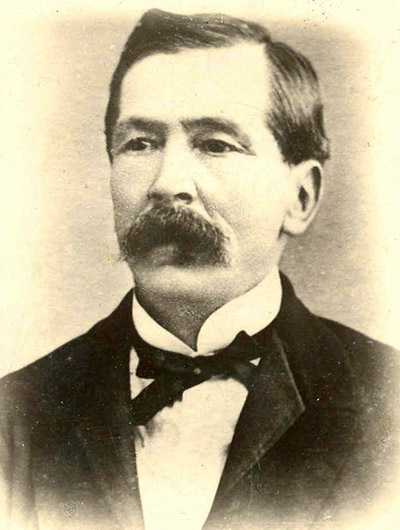
Manuel María Mallarino.

All these measures, especially the reduction of the power of the Military Forces, added to the discontent of the artisans, propitiated a military coup directed by José María Melo on 17 April 1854. This coup d'état survived until the month of December of the same year, when it was controlled by a coalition of the Liberal and Conservative Parties, headed by Vice President José de Abadía and General Tomás Cipriano de Mosquera. In this sense, for Frank Safford, the majority participation of conservatives in the counterrevolution allowed the party to control the elections of 1854 and 1856, which first led to a transitional government directed by Manuel María Mallarino and then by Mariano Ospina Rodríguez.

However, even with the return of conservatism to power, the road to the formation of a federal and liberal system was difficult to modify, especially after the declaration of the territory of Panama as a sovereign State beginning in 1855.

=== Federal subjects ===
Federal subjects of the Granadine Confederation during 1858.

After the disestablishment of Gran Colombia, the centralized government of the Republic of New Granada which was ratified by the constitution of 1843, was soon challenged by the independentist feelings of the different regions; particularly the provinces of Azuero, Chiriquí, Panamá, and Veraguas, which were demanding autonomous status. The Constitution of 1853 permitted this so that on February 27, 1855, the State of Panamá could be created within the Republic of New Granada.

Soon others followed, regionalism was too strong, and in order to prevent a division like the one Greater Colombia had, with Venezuela and Ecuador quitting the union, congress allowed the creation of other sovereign states:

- Federal State of Antioquia was created from Antioquia Province on June 11, 1856.
- Federal State of Santander, which included the provinces of Socorro and Pamplona, was created May 13, 1857.

The Law of June 15, 1857 created the other states that would later form parts of the Granadine Confederation:

- Federal State of Bolívar (Estado Federal de Bolívar), which included Cartagena Province.
- Federal State of Boyacá (Estado Federal de Boyacá), which included the provinces of Tunja, Tundama, Casanare, and the cantons of Chiquinquirá and Vélez.
- Federal State of Cauca (Estado Federal de Cauca), which included the provinces of Buenaventura, Chocó, Pasto and Popayán and the region of Caquetá.
- Federal State of Cundinamarca (Estado Federal de Cundinamarca), which included the province of Mariquita, Bogotá, Neiva, and Tolima.
- Federal State of Magdalena (Estado Federal de Magdalena), which included the provinces of El Banco, Padilla, Santa Marta, Tenerife and Valledupar.

The nation was formed by the union of these Sovereign States which were confederated in perpetuity to form a Sovereign Nation, free and independent with the name "Granadine Confederation".

During 1858 the new constituency, with its majority of conservatives, convened and signed the Constitution for the Granadine Confederation of 1858, confirming Bogotá as its Federal Capital.

On July 12, 1861, after fighting the constitutional government of the president Mariano Ospina Rodríguez, the general Tomas Cipriano de Mosquera created the Sovereign State of Tolima, created out of the State of Cundinamarca. This was confirmed and legalized by the rest of the states of the Colombian Union, by means of Article 41 of the Pact of the Union on September 20, 1861, reaffirming the legality of the institutionalism of Tolima.

=== Constitution of 1858 ===
By the conservative mandate of Mariano Ospina Rodríguez, Congress passed and approved a new Constitution for the country on May 22, 1858. By this constitution, the country was named officially as the Granadine Confederation and conformed by eight sovereign states.

More power and representation were given to the provinces, as each state could have its own legislature and elect its own president.

The vice presidency was abolished and replaced with a dignitary named by the Congress.

The president and senators could be elected to serve a period of four years and the Representatives of the House for two.

The Constitution also listed the powers and obligations of the states and of the central government, and gave parameters to creating new laws and amending the constitution. It included the basic freedoms, and rights of the people. The constitution was important as it signaled the official beginning of the confederacy and set legal parameters.

=== Civil war ===
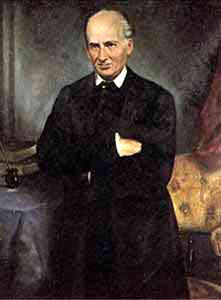
President of the Granadine Confederation Mariano Ospina Rodríguez

Even though the Constitution of 1858 had legalized federalism, the politics of the president Mariano Ospina Rodríguez favored centralism. This conservativism clashed with the wishes of the states which wanted more power and autonomy.

This caused some leaders to consider the administrative base of the federation as a notion to underestimate the authority of the states, and led the national government to view the independent aspirations of the states as a threat to the overall nation.

The political tension came to its pinnacle in 1859 when Congress passed two controversial laws. On April 8, 1859, Congress passed a law giving the President the right to remove the duly appointed governors of the states and appoint one of his choosing. With this law, the president secured the power of the Conservative Party.

On May 10, 1859, another law was passed, this one giving the president the power to create administrative departments in states so to control their resources and how would they be used.

These laws angered many liberal leaders, especially general Tomás Cipriano de Mosquera, an ex-president of New Granada, and a powerful and influential politician in the country. He denounced these laws as unconstitutional and made contact with other liberal leaders in other states, who gave him their support to revolt against the president, even though not all agreed with his ideas, they supported him and accepted to allow him to become Supreme Director of War, because they saw no other way to get back their autonomy than to revolt against the government.

By a decree of May 8, 1860, Mosquera broke relations with the national government, declared himself Supreme Director of War, and declared a separated state, the Sovereign State of Cauca. From that moment the country entered a civil war.

In retaliation, the government of Ospina Rodríguez endorsed insurrections against the liberal governments in some states, the first of these armed conflicts being in Santander, against the government of Eustorgio Salgar during 1859; the Confederacy Granadine declared war on the state of Santander, and sent its army to subdue Eustogio Salgar, who was captured along with other important figures, including Aquileo Parra.

Civil war then spread to other states, including Bolívar, Antioquía, Magdalena and Cauca. In an unexpected act, Mosquera captured Bogotá on June 18, 1861, declared himself president of the provisional government, and arrested Ospina Rodríguez, his brother Pastor Ospina, and Bartolomé Calvo, the newly elected president of the confederacy.

The war ended in 1862 when the last leaders of the conservative opposition died or gave up.

=== The Convention of Rionegro of 1863 ===
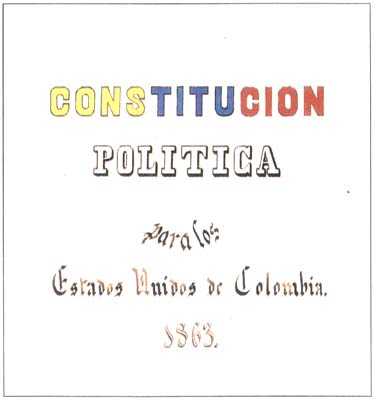
Political Constitution for the United States of Colombia. 1863.

The Granadine Confederation came to an end on 8 May 1863, with the signing of the Rionegro Constitution. In this new constitutional order the country was officially renamed the United States of Colombia.

The United States of Colombia consisted then of nine sovereign states, and new rules and powers were given to the states and presidents. The Liberals had come to fear the great power of Mosquera, and they drafted the new constitution to limit his power. The Radical Liberals defended a federal government based on a laissez-faire policy, in which regional and local autonomy were protected, where there was no national army, a society with basic rights and freedoms, based on education and open market values, with no intervention by the church.

Giving continuity in many aspects to its predecessor and radicalizing its positions regarding the separation between Church and State, the political charter drafted in Rionegro was inspired both by the federal ideal of non-interventionism of the central Government in the affairs of the States and by the most extreme limitation of the power of the federal Executive.

In practice, the obstinacy of the Convention of Rionegro to return some power to the central Executive was mediated by the fear of the caudillist tendencies of Tomás Cipriano de Mosquera. Even though the liberals supported the Mosquerists in the war, and the latter was the great winner of the revolt, the radicals managed to impose their mark on the Constitution of 63, thus annulling the personalist pretensions of Tomás Cipriano de Mosquera after the war.

In this sense, measures such as the freedom of the arms trade, the independence of the states in matters related to education and, above all, the decision not to form a national Army that would support the Executive against the states in an eventual new military adventure of Mosquerism, were maintained.

== Politics ==
The political system that resulted from the Constitution of 1858, by which the Granadine Confederation appeared, and which subsequently gave way to the formation of the United States of Colombia, was traversed by a period of deep instability in which the conservatives, weakly cohesive around the Government of Mariano Ospina Rodríguez, tried to remain in power against a coalition formed by the radical liberals and the forces of the Caucan caudillo Tomás Cipriano de Mosquera.

In this sense, it is impossible to understand the Granadine Confederation outside the Mosquerist revolution from 1860 to 1863, since it made possible the direct access of the liberals to power and the radicalization of the federal model in the Rionegro Constitution.

The Granadine Confederation gathers a certain consensus among the political and intellectual elites on the convenience of the adoption of a federal model, as the solution to the dictatorial and authoritarian tendencies of national caudillos such as José María Melo tried to be. The maximum exponents of this perspective, making clear that the ideas came both from the Liberal Party and from within the Conservative Party, mostly suppressed the capacities of the central power, with which they laid the foundations of three decades of predominance of regional and local powers in the Republic. Thus, the order instituted in this framework ended up becoming unsustainable due to the practical annulment of the federal Government by the elimination of the majority of its powers, a phenomenon that steadily affected the course of the country at the end of the 19th century.

=== The Constitution of 1858 ===
The Constitution of 1858, by which the country was called the Granadine Confederation, was in practical terms the result of the creation of the sovereign states of Panama, Antioquia, Bolívar, Boyacá, Cauca, Cundinamarca, Tolima and Magdalena, as a reality that had not been contemplated by the Constitution of 1853. In this sense, the constituent exercise headed by Mariano Ospina Rodríguez only came to reconfirm a reality that already was de facto since 1855 and that would give shape to federalism, which in practical terms was already a consensus among the majority of the members of the national and provincial elite.

In this way, due to its particular formation, the first element that becomes evident is that the Constitution of 1858, rather than being a real exercise of political organization of society, was above all a product of the need to establish connections between the set of norms that gave shape to independent and sovereign states, avoiding the appearance of secessionist tendencies inside the country. Thus, the Constitution formally recognized the supremacy of the provincial over the national, giving the faculty to the state Assemblies and the governors to manage their affairs with broad freedom. Elements such as freedom in the arms trade, the determination of electoral law, the appointment of officials and the organization of education were functions delegated in their entirety to the regional Governments.

In what refers to the attributions of the federal Government, whose period in the case of Congress was four years and of the president only two, the Constitution of 1858 allowed the federal Executive only the management of foreign relations, the organization of the institutions of the Confederation and what corresponded to determining the general elements of federal legislation.

By reason of these constitutional provisions, the power of the federal Government was very limited and responded in essence to the conservation of the union between practically independent states that, otherwise, would hardly have continued being part of the political organization now confederated. This absolute attachment to provincial sovereignty and to the non-interventionism of the federal Government was the element that inspired the uprising in 1860, after President Ospina Rodríguez tried to recover several of the traditional powers of the first magistracy, through a series of laws that in 1859 modified in a substantial way the constitutional order.

=== The laws of 1859 ===
The laws of 1859 resulted from the necessity that President Mariano Ospina Rodríguez identified of endowing the federal Government with the capacity to intervene effectively in the affairs of the states of the Confederation. With this objective in mind, the federal president used the conservative majorities in Congress to promote a series of laws and reforms to the Constitution of 1858, which from his perspective would allow the federal Executive to maintain order in the country. However, it would be the content of the reforms that would promote the liberal uprising of 1860, which in turn would lead to the overthrow, almost without real opportunity to oppose it, of the system that was intended to be defended through these measures.

Three were the reforms that affected the fundamental elements of the political organization of the Granadine Confederation, since they aimed to modify the electoral, treasury and military order. Each one of these laws was interpreted by the liberal sectors as a violation of the sovereignty acquired by the states through their foundational norms, and the search by the conservatives to perpetuate themselves indefinitely in power, these being sufficient motives to wage a legitimate and just uprising in defense of the broken order.

The first was the Elections Law, of 8 April 1859, which sought to create through a national norm, electoral districts and Electoral Councils by confederated state, for the planning, execution and control of voting. The territorial division started from a partisan criterion, which weakened liberalism in its principal political strongholds, in addition to annulling the different laws on the state electoral system that the provincial Assemblies had produced.

The second great reform of the government of Ospina Rodríguez was the Organic Treasury Law of 10 May 1859. This norm did not imply any substantial change to the Constitution, but it did become immediately a factor of tension between the federal Government and the states. What the law sought was to endow the central Executive with the capacity to independently appoint a Treasury intendant for each state, who would be in charge of carrying out the functions that constitutionally were assigned to the federal Government, as a kind of delegate. Shortly afterward the instrument became a factor of conflict, since with partisan interests Ospina designated conservative delegates, in regions dominated by liberal governors, which led these to enter into opposition as a kind of alternative governorship.

As a third reform, President Ospina presented an organic law for the Public Force, which established that the armed bodies recruited, organized, instituted and disciplined by the state Governments should remain subordinated to the control of the federal Executive in case of foreign war or disturbance of public order. In this case the general Government had to inspect the armed forces and appoint their officers, while the states coordinated the logistical part of the units, recruiting the personnel of the municipal guard corps.

=== War of the Sovereignties ===
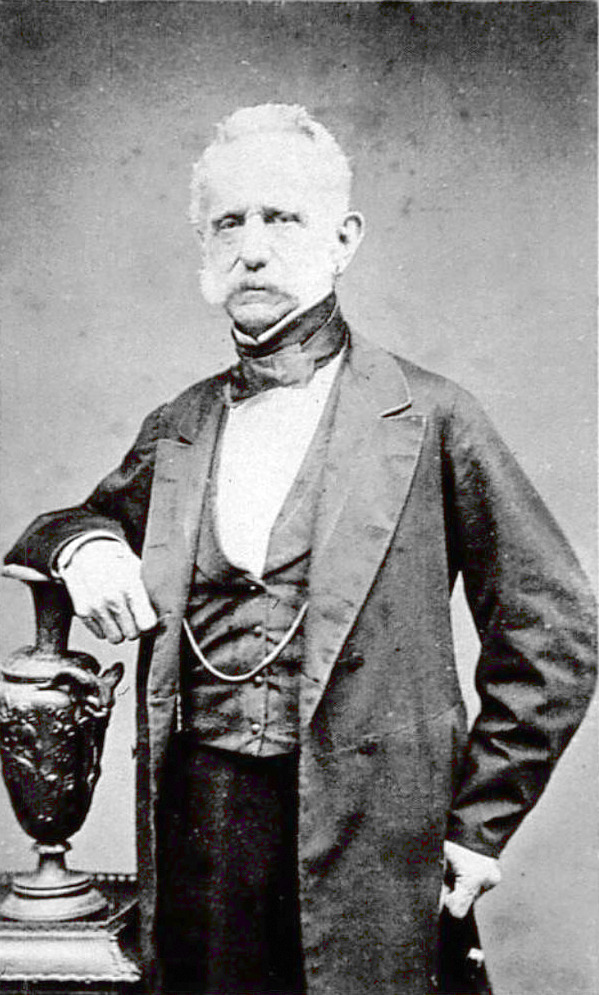
Portrait of Tomás Cipriano de Mosquera.

From the perspective of María Teresa Hincapié and Liliana López, the war from 1860 to 1863 was a conflict guided by a competition between different bureaucracies, the national and the provincial, which sought to establish the forms of domination that would give basis to the Republic.

In this sense, Hincapié and López propose that the confrontation occurred between a federal Government that understood as a necessity the establishment of a form of direct domination, summarized in the reforms of 59, that would provide the central Government with the tools to act upon its regional counterparts. On the other hand, the provincial Governments sought to maintain their place as intermediaries between the central Government and society, under the principle of a space of local control that was their own and base of their authority.

Hincapié and López then define the war in three stages. The first, from 1847 until 1859, was based on decentralized processes that occurred in several of the sovereign states (Magdalena, Santander, Bolívar and Cauca), with partisan purposes, for the control of the local Governments.

The second stage, from 1858 to 1861, centers on the uprising of Tomás Cipriano de Mosquera, because of what he believed was a violation of the Constitution of 1858 in the laws of 1859. This stage ends with the victory of the liberal Governments and the caudillo in 1861, and the proclamation of a provisional Government with General Mosquera at the head.

The third moment is located by the authors from 1861 until the issuance of the Rionegro Constitution in 1863, in which an itinerant conservative resistance to the Government of Mosquera was presented, who by this moment had resumed his hostilities toward the Catholic Church, because of what he thought was the necessity of strengthening the external sovereignty of the country against destabilizing external powers such as those of the Vatican.

It must be emphasized, and thus the authors do, that the revolt of 1860 was both an armed event and a legal struggle, as well as a discursive competition where the liberals, and especially Mosquera, understood that their struggle was legitimized in the defense of the federal constitutional order (based in principle on federalism, as a project of non-interventionism of the central Government in the affairs proper to the sovereign states) that had been broken in an illegal way by President Ospina Rodríguez.

=== The acts of separation of David and Santiago of 1861 ===
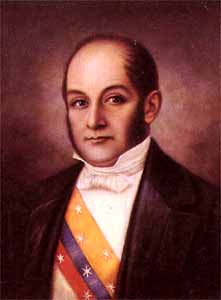
José Domingo de Obaldía, signer of the Act of David.

As a consequence of the civil war that scourged the Granadine Confederation, in the city of Santiago de Veraguas a meeting of 151 notable persons was held that consigned in the act of 21 March 1861, their desire that the state of Panama separate itself from the Confederation and requested Governor Santiago de la Guardia Arrué the convocation of an extraordinary legislature to decide the matter. Ten days later, in the city of David, in the act of 31 March 1861 the points of view expressed in that of Santiago de Veraguas were approved and shared. A series of messengers were in charge of disseminating the secessionist attempt throughout the entire state of Panama, which found acceptance throughout the entire western region.

In the acts was reflected the prevalence of the liberal ideology that characterized the political class of the transit zone (Panamá-Colón), transferred to the interior landowners. Justo Arosemena in his booklet entitled "The Ex-Plenipotentiary of Panama responds to an accusation by Mr. Jil Colunje", offers two causes by which the determinations of David and Santiago were not carried into practice:

1. "[...] that in the capital of the State it had very few supporters".
2. "[...] that the triumph of one of the national parties was beginning to be seen, and it was suspected that it would not consent to such independence".

These acts are considered by Panamanian historiography as antecedents of the separation of Panama, being one of the seventeen attempts of secession, in which the desire of the Isthmians to constitute themselves in republic in order to self-determine and exploit the potential of their geographic position is verified.

== Presidents of the Granadine Confederation ==
Three were the presidents of the Confederation:

Photo	President	Period	Party	Comments
	Mariano Ospina Rodríguez	22 May 1858 – 31 March 1861	Conservative	Founder of the Colombian Conservative Party
	Bartolomé Calvo	1 April 1861 – 10 June 1861	Conservative	Attorney General, designated in absence of the Vice President
	Julio Arboleda Pombo	10 June 1861 – 18 June 1861	Conservative	Attorney General

== Economy ==
Giving account of particular circumstances in economic terms for the period of the Granadine Confederation is extremely complicated. Both because the period inserts itself in a series of dynamics that had been taking shape since the middle of the 19th century, and because the Government of Mariano Ospina Rodríguez never managed to consolidate itself enough to undertake some reform of importance that altered the economic processes that had been developing since the decade of 1840. However, the form acquired by the Constitution of 1858, bearing in mind that this is the result of a unilateral constituent exercise of conservatism, does allow giving account of some substantial elements in the understanding of the politics and economic development of the 19th century in Colombia.

In this sense, it becomes necessary to differentiate, as José Antonio Ocampo advises, between what were the decisions and debates on the economic policy that the Government should follow and the economic dynamics that drove the country in the period. The above starting, under the perspective of Ocampo, from the necessity of relativizing the real impact that many of the measures undertaken in the period by the radicals had on the Colombian economic structure, especially the rural one.

=== Debates on economic policy in the middle of the 19th century ===
On the one hand, it is useful to reconsider the existence of really significant differences between the thought of liberals and conservatives in what refers to the economic policy that the states and the federal Government should follow. In this sense, José Antonio Ocampo proposes that in reality among the elites of the parties, beyond the supposed liberal-merchant-free-trade and conservative-protectionist-artisan relationship, there does not exist a substantial difference between the collectivities. From both sides of the political spectrum, the model of economic liberalism and the liberation of monopolies was in all cases a consensus, if one wishes tacit, among the different liberal and conservative Governments that promoted reforms in its favor.

The Granadine Confederation is an excellent example of this dynamic, since it is located as one of the conservative contributions to the sustaining of economic liberalism, in the midst of the traumatic transit at the political level that occurred from the government of José Hilario López in the middle of the 19th century and the formalization of liberal radicalism in the Rionegro Constitution (1863).

In this sense, the maintenance throughout the entire period of a policy directed at favoring the growth of international trade stands out, through the production of agricultural and mining goods that had demand in the European market and in the United States. Thus, during the period the reduction of levies related to export-type production and of customs duties on trade was promoted, together with the privatization of goods with their own market abroad, such as tobacco. In relation to this last element, from 1849 until 1880 the principal taxes that were maintained from the colony were gradually eliminated, and a policy of decentralization of revenues and expenditures was undertaken by which lesser tributes, such as income from aguardiente, tolls and smelting of metals, together with other more significant ones such as the tithe and the fifth, were ceded to the regional Governments.

Nevertheless, upon acquiring control over revenues and expenditures, and in the midst of the rise of liberal ideas, the provincial Governments tended to eliminate the taxes that they considered affected the economic progress of their territories, especially those that came from the colony, such as the tithe and the fifth on gold.

On the other hand, it is also convenient to relativize the mainly anticlerical character of the liberal economic reforms of the middle of the 19th century. Although it is true that many of the measures taken by the liberal and even conservative Governments (it is necessary to remember that the first period of Tomás Cipriano de Mosquera was carried out under the banners of this party) affected the interests of the Catholic Church, the greater part of those reforms were directed at breaking with what at the time were understood as the remnants of the colony. Thus the disentailment of mortmain property, the redemption of ecclesiastical censuses and the successive confiscations of property from clergymen are closer to a very broad spectrum of attempts to modernize the economy through measures that included the end of state monopolies, the abolition of slavery, the distribution of the resguardos and some essays of direct taxation.

=== The economic dynamics of the second part of the 19th century ===
In what refers to the economic dynamics that drove the development of the country in the second part of the 19th century, three elements can be pointed out:

In the first place, throughout the 19th century, the Colombian population continued being in essence rural, with self-sufficient spaces that were poorly interconnected among themselves and in sustained demographic growth despite the wars. In practice, during the period a national exchange market was not constituted that would dynamize production or represent a real source of accumulation for national producers. The only communication route that allowed some interregional exchange was the Magdalena River, which in essence focused on allowing the departure of products abroad and on facilitating the arrival of luxury goods toward the interior of the country.

In this sense, it is through colonization and the titling of large extensions of land property of the State that the liberal and conservative Governments tried to give dynamism to national agricultural and mining production. In this case two types of expansion of the agricultural frontier were presented:

In the first instance, through colonization and individual and family settlement in vacant or unexploited lands, the natural frontier zones were transformed making them productive. In the second instance, the Governments also favored the assignment of large extensions of land for the formation of haciendas for the large producers, which in the majority of cases were not exploited and could be object of irregular occupation by settlers.

This dynamic of territorial expansion was both a form for the improvement of the material conditions of life for broad sectors of the population and a scenario of multiple conflicts over the possession of land and its effective use. Here it is necessary to differentiate between the first migrations, in which there existed large extensions of land to assign to producers, and the second and third waves of migrants, who did not find space where to settle, for which they ended up as employees or appropriating assigned lands. The conflicts between large landowners and landless migrants were constant, normally decided in favor of the former, although during the period several laws were issued for the protection of settlers in the zones of the agricultural frontier.

As for foreign trade, which Jorge Orlando Melo classifies as the principal, and perhaps only, real source of capital accumulation in the country. The second part of the 19th century was, in general terms, a period of export expansion in which products alternative to the traditional precious metals managed to find cycles of good reception in the European markets. Here it is key to point out that only a small producing minority that could respond to the scenarios of opportunity (principally in Europe and the United States), which occurred with the increase in the price of some of the local products abroad (between 1850 and 1882 the principal ones were tobacco, quinine, straw hats and gold), really benefited from foreign trade during these years. It must not be forgotten that the investment of foreign capital in Colombia was little in this period; the infrastructure, deficient; and the economic stimuli to the increase of production, very low.

In what refers to the Granadine Confederation, after a period of expansion of exports between 1849 and 1857, from 1859 until the decade of 1870 there was a stagnation in national exports due mostly to the war and to the political instability that the country faced in those years. In relation to imports, the second half of the 19th century was a favorable period for the arrival to Colombia of elements such as textiles and luxury goods, which experienced a reduction of their price because of innovations in matters of maritime and land transport that reduced the additional costs in bringing them from Europe.

In the third place, even though the national debate concentrated on the different projects and types of education that the liberal and conservative elites wanted for the country, and measures were undertaken around the elimination of slavery, the greater part of the population continued being illiterate and poor. Although the situation changed from province to province, in general education was restricted to a minimum sector of society which was instructed principally in law and technical knowledge such as engineering, metallurgy and medicine. In general terms, the population was not too stimulated toward formal education, since in the majority of educational centers they were not instructed in technical knowledge useful for agricultural production, for which the knowledge that resulted significant to individuals was acquired in the very practice in the productive zones.

== Religion ==
During the brief life of the Confederacy Granadine, the Roman Catholic Church was a constant target for the government. Although its population was still very Roman Catholic, and religion formed an essential part of life, the government approved a number of laws directed at controlling the clergy and church property during this time.

The consideration of the role of religion in this period, in which the Granadine Confederation inaugurates a particularly conflictive period in this matter, demands separately addressing what is related to religion and the Church. If the deeply and overwhelmingly Christian-Catholic character of the Colombian population is undeniable, nevertheless, the role that the different actors assigned to the Church as institution was different.

In what refers to Christianity, the preponderance of religion in the life of society is clear throughout the 19th century. In the case of New Granada, as Franz Hensel Riveros proposes, the Catholic religion was fundamental as a cohesive element of society and basis of the political project of the post-independence moment.

This centrality and legitimacy of Christianity would remain constant throughout the 19th century. Thus, except for the clash that the Catholic population faced against its Protestant counterpart in the middle of the century, the preponderance of Christianity as the religion of the majority of the population was never questioned. In this sense, as Andrey Coy Sierra proposes, the issue of religious tolerance toward the middle of the century is focused fundamentally toward the idea of freedom of belief as a mode of assimilation and protection toward foreigners, principally Protestants, more than as a questioning of the role of Christianity in social life.

During the first presidency of general Tomás Cipriano de Mosquera during 1849, Mosquera adopted a radical position with the church, approving laws confiscating religious property and subjecting the clergy to government rules. He banished the Society of Jesus from the Republic of New Granada and expelled the Archbishop of Bogotá. The closure of convents and monasteries drove nuns into poverty, although many were taken into homes by citizens. All of this drew direct criticism from the Vatican, even causing Pope Pius IX to condemn the government of Colombia for its actions.

After the creation of the Granadine Confederation, during the government of Mariano Ospina Rodríguez, the Jesuits were once again welcomed into the country and religious tensions eased.

This brief period of religious calm ended when Mosquera, who assumed the presidency a second time, and continued with his anticlerical attitude, driving once again the Jesuits out of the Confederacy, giving them only seventy-two hours to leave the country or risk imprisonment, as he blamed them of endorsing an insurgency. He passed a couple of anticlerical laws. One of these was the Tuition of Cults, a law that prohibited religious officials to exercise their functions without authorization from the government, thus requiring special licenses to preach. Through another law, he confiscated the property (land, houses, and other properties that could be sold) of religious communities and organizations such as schools, hospitals, monasteries, and churches. Those organizations that opposed it were banned and abolished.

These laws were not approved as a direct attack on the Church, but what was pretended was to improve the situation of the national treasury, which was depleted because of the civil war being waged. The Church assets were sold to the best buyer, improving industry and investment while putting money in the hands of the state. However, the laws provided little assistance to the farmers, who finished up owning little of the land Mosquera intended, with his slogan of "Land for those who work it".

=== The problem of the Catholic Church ===
The fundamental issue of the religious controversies of the 19th century refers not to the Christian religion – to which the majority of liberals subscribed, the same as their conservative counterparts –, but to the special prerogatives that the State-Church union allowed the Catholic institution. The conflicts of the middle of the 19th century around the Church are in relation to the organization of earthly power, and not with the system of beliefs.

In this same direction, as Fernán González demonstrates, the equivalence between the conservative party and the Church never operated in a direct way. Multiple members of the ecclesiastical organization formed part of or collaborated at the material and intellectual level with the liberal project in the conflicts of the second part of the 19th century. The tensions around religion in the liberal reforms of the decade of 1850 hinge on the dissolution of the Church-State link or, alternatively, the coexistence between the Church and the State as foundation of the social and moral order of the population.

Seen in this way, what operates from 1849 until 1863 is an attempt by the liberal party, especially by the faction known as the radicals and by the caudillist figure of General Tomás Cipriano de Mosquera, to reduce the power of the Catholic Church within society. Meanwhile, in the case of the conservatives, who were united to the Catholic organization since the War of the Supremes (1839–1842), the project was to form a nation in the values of Catholicism, giving the Catholic Church the place that by its own right it had as representative on Earth of the Christian religion.

Within this framework can be understood reforms and laws that led to the first and second expulsion of the Jesuit Order from the national territory by Tomás Cipriano de Mosquera, the confiscation of goods and lands from the Church, the prohibition against members of the Church exercising their offices without authorization from the Government and, above all, the loss of the educational monopoly from the hands of the Catholic institutions. Through this last element, the radical liberals, and before them General Santander, saw the possibility of introducing doctrines that were understood as fundamental for the intellectual and moral progress of the country, such as the positivist philosophy of Jeremy Bentham, which at the time were condemned and prohibited by the Church.

In what refers specifically to the Granadine Confederation, two processes stand out because of their centrality in the debates and conflicts of the period. The first of them is that, even though the Constitution of 1858 maintained in principle freedom of worship, President Mariano Ospina Rodríguez authorized the return of the Jesuits to the national territory, as an attempt to obtain the support of the Catholic Church and of the conservative factions, which saw in his measures a violation of the federal character of the territorial organization of the country.

The second fact, which is framed in the final part of the war of 1859, occurs again at the hands of Tomás Cipriano de Mosquera. On this occasion, the victorious general of the war again expelled the Jesuits and conditioned the activity of the Church to State surveillance of its properties and hierarchical organization, in what the Mosquerists understood as the struggle for national sovereignty against the intervention of the Vatican.

== Geography ==
=== Borders ===
According to the constitution of 1858, the limits of the territory of the Granadine Confederation were to be the same as those of 1810, that divided the territory of the Viceroyalty of New Granada from the Captaincy General of Venezuela, the Captaincy General of Guatemala, and the Portuguese possessions in Brazil. In the west, the limits would be those marked provisionally by the treaty with the government of Ecuador on July 9, 1856, and all treaties with that republic.

=== Regions ===
The Granadine Confederation covered a vast region, sharply divided by its geography. The country was divided by the three cordilleras of the Andes mountains, the Magdalena River which was the main artery of navigation in the country, and the Isthmus of Panama which was isolated in its own region. The jungles in the south only added to the confusion. The unclear borders were never definitively marked, and the terrain secluded its residents, mostly natives, from the rest of the country.

Four isolated regions divided the country; the Oriental Region included Cundinamarca, Tolima, Boyacá and Santander; the Cauca Region, which included Chocó and extended to Marmato; the Region of Antioquía, that extended down to the River Chinchiná near Manizales; and the Atlantic Region.

Each of these regions behaved like a separate country without relations to the others. This isolation and lack of roads was a severe restraint on the economy, as its already distant nuclei were too far from each other for trade to grow and investment to take place.

== See also ==
- Tomás Cipriano de Mosquera
- United States of Colombia
- Confederalism
- History of Colombia
