= Tenerife Province =

Tenerife Province may refer to:

- Santa Cruz de Tenerife Province, Spain
- Tenerife Province (Colombia)
