= Caquetá =

Caquetá may refer to:

- Caquetá River, or Japurá River, in Colombia and Brazil
- Caquetá Territory, a former territory of Colombia
- Caquetá Department, a department of Colombia
