= Bolívar State =

Bolívar State may refer to:

- Bolívar State (Venezuela)
- Bolívar State (Colombia) / Sovereign State of Bolívar
