= Córdoba Province, Colombia =

Province of Colombia

Coordinates: 6.1500°N 75.3667°W

Córdoba Province was one of the provinces of Colombia, it belonged to Antioquia State.

The province existed until April 14, 1855, when it was abolished and its territory reintegrated into the province of Antioquia. In 1856, when the Sovereign State of Antioquia was established, Córdova became part of it as one of its administrative divisions. Its name was given in honor of the illustrious New Granadan José María Córdova.
