= Antioquia State =

Historic state of Colombia

Coordinates: 6.33333°N 75.25°W

1863 Antioquia State

Antioquia State was one of the states of Colombia, which existed from 1856 until 1886. Today the area of the former state makes up most of modern day Antioquia Department, Colombia.

== Limits ==
In 1863 it bordered:

- Santander State and Boyacá State in the East.
- Tolima State in the South.
- Cauca State in the West.
- Bolívar State in the North.

== Naming ==
- on 11 June 1856 created under the name Estado Federal de Antioquia (Federal State of Antioquia).
- 1858 recognized as Estado de la Federación in the constitution of the Granadine Confederation of 1858.
- 1863 named Estado Soberano de Antioquia (Sovereign State of Antioquia) in the constitution of the United States of Colombia of 1863, with Pascual Bravo as president.

== Subdivisions ==
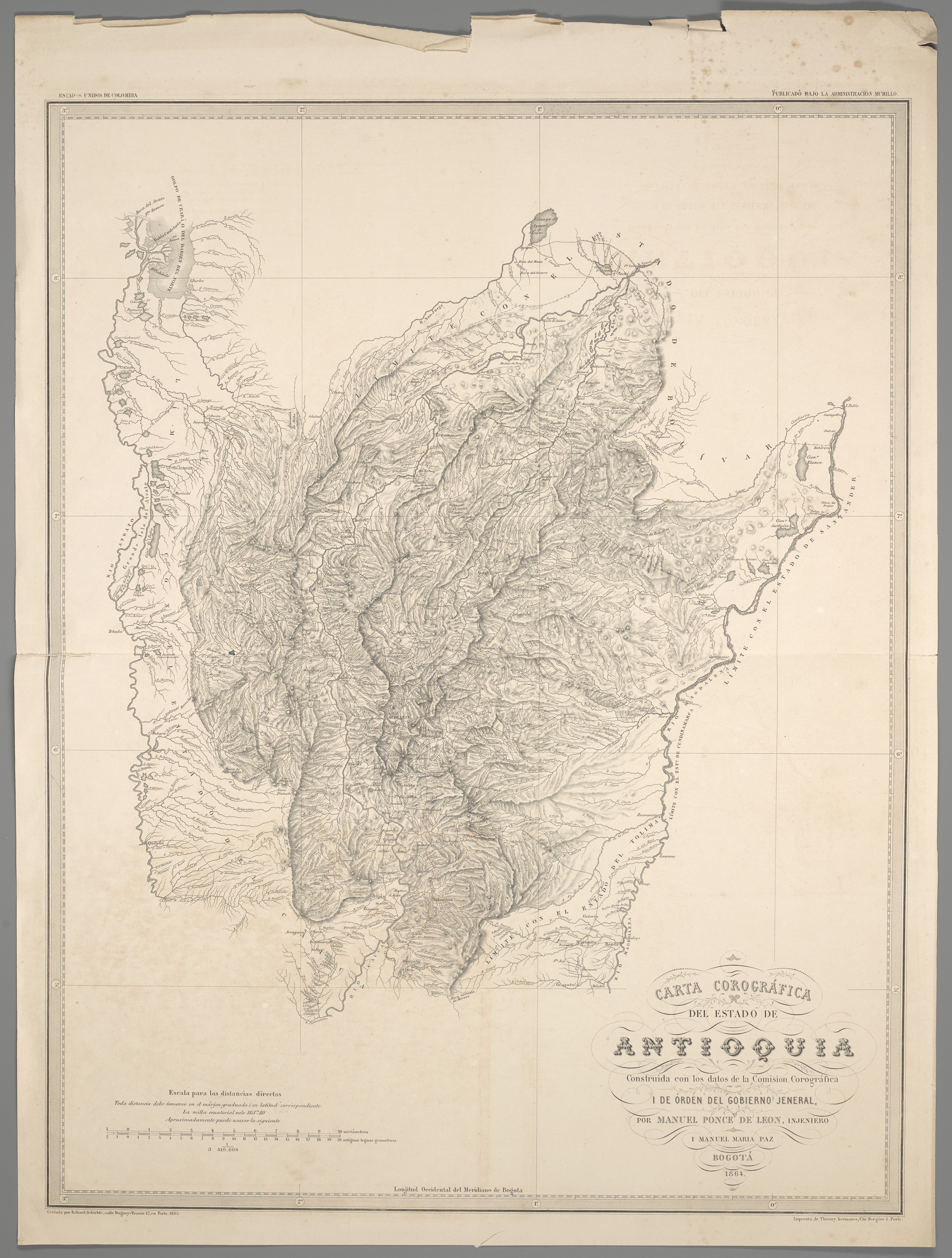
Sovereign State of Antioquia.

=== Provinces 1856 ===
Departments of Antioquia State, 1859.

Through the law of June 11, 1856, the State was composed of the same provinces that constituted:

- Antioquia Province (capital Santa Fe de Antioquia)
- Córdoba Province (capital Rionegro)
- Medellín Province (capital Medellín)

=== Departments ===
Departments of Antioquia State, 1865.

Later the State by Act of December 17, 1859, the territory was divided into six departments:

- Córdoba Department.
- Medellín Department.
- Remedios Department.
- Santa Rosa de Osos Department.
- Santa Fé de Antioquia Department.
- Sonsón Department.

During the government of Pedro Justo Berrio (1864) the State was divided into 7 departments:

- Medellín Department.
- Marinilla Department.
- Santa Rosa de Osos Department.
- Sopetrán Department.
- Sonsón Department.
- La Ceja Department.
- Valdivia Department.

This division was changed later that year, leaving only 5 departments:

- Centro Department.
- Norte Department.
- Occidente Department.
- Oriente Department.
- Sur Department.
