= Designate (Colombia) =

Person selected to act as President when the incumbent was dead

Under the Colombian Constitution of 1886 the Designate was a person—a member of the Senate or member of the Cabinet—selected to act as President when the incumbent was dead, ill or otherwise unable to discharge the duties of office.

The Designate was elected by the Senate at the beginning of each Legislature (in Colombian law, a "Legislature" is approximately equivalent to a session of the United States Congress: i.e. it is the one-year period that a Congress sits for, rather than the whole Congress itself). The Designate could be indefinitely reelected during only one Presidency.

The concept of the Designate survived until the Colombian Constitution of 1991, when the office of Vice President reappeared.
