= Mompox Province =

Coordinates: 9.2333°N 74.4167°W

Mompox Province was the name of different provinces of Colombia.

In 1855 it was a province of the Republic of New Granada.

Later it was a province of Bolívar State (Colombia).
