= Guamo =

Coordinates: 4°05′N 74°55′W

- Municipality and town
- Flag Coat of arms

- Location of the municipality and town of Guamo in the Tolima Department of Colombia.
- Country: Colombia
- Department: Tolima Department

Area
  - Total: 561 km^{2} (217 sq mi)
- Elevation: 321 m (1,053 ft)

Population (Census 2018)
  - Total: 30,516
- Time zone: UTC-5 (Colombia Standard Time)

Guamo is a town and municipality in the Tolima department of Colombia. The population of the municipality was 30,516 as of the 2018 census.

== Climate ==
Climate data for Guamo, elevation 360 m (1,180 ft), (1981–2010)
Month	Jan	Feb	Mar	Apr	May	Jun	Jul	Aug	Sep	Oct	Nov	Dec	Year
Mean daily maximum °C (°F)	33.4 (92.1)	33.6 (92.5)	33.1 (91.6)	32.1 (89.8)	32.0 (89.6)	32.7 (90.9)	33.9 (93.0)	35.0 (95.0)	34.2 (93.6)	32.4 (90.3)	31.6 (88.9)	32.0 (89.6)	33.0 (91.4)
Daily mean °C (°F)	27.9 (82.2)	28.3 (82.9)	28.1 (82.6)	27.4 (81.3)	27.4 (81.3)	27.6 (81.7)	28.3 (82.9)	29.3 (84.7)	28.7 (83.7)	27.7 (81.9)	27.1 (80.8)	27.2 (81.0)	27.9 (82.2)
Mean daily minimum °C (°F)	22.7 (72.9)	22.9 (73.2)	23.0 (73.4)	22.9 (73.2)	22.8 (73.0)	22.4 (72.3)	22.3 (72.1)	22.8 (73.0)	22.9 (73.2)	22.7 (72.9)	22.7 (72.9)	22.5 (72.5)	22.7 (72.9)
Average precipitation mm (inches)	83.4 (3.28)	89.1 (3.51)	111.3 (4.38)	203.9 (8.03)	186.1 (7.33)	80.9 (3.19)	52.5 (2.07)	47.8 (1.88)	112.5 (4.43)	169.8 (6.69)	155.6 (6.13)	119.4 (4.70)	1,386 (54.57)
Average precipitation days	7	9	10	15	14	9	7	6	10	14	13	9	119
Average relative humidity (%)	75	74	74	80	79	75	68	63	69	75	80	80	74
Mean monthly sunshine hours	198.4	160.9	142.6	141.0	158.1	162.0	182.9	182.9	162.0	170.5	165.0	173.6	1,999.9
Mean daily sunshine hours	6.4	5.7	4.6	4.7	5.1	5.4	5.9	5.9	5.4	5.5	5.5	5.6	5.5
Source: Instituto de Hidrologia Meteorologia y Estudios Ambientales
