= Tolima State =

Coordinates: 4.43333°N 75.2167°W

1863 Tolima State

Tolima State was one of the states of Colombia, which existed from 1861 until 1886.

On July 12, 1861, after raising in arms against the constitutional government of the president Mariano Ospina Rodríguez, the general Tomas Cipriano de Mosquera created the Tolima State, carved out of Cundinamarca State.

In 1863 it bordered:

- Cauca State in the South and the West.
- Antioquia State in the North.

== Subdivisions ==
In 1861, Mariquita Department and Neiva Department were separated from Cundinamarca State to form Tolima State.

In 1869, the state was divided into three departments, each further into districts:

- Centro Department (capital Guamo).
- Norte Department (capital Ibagué).
- Sur Department (capital Neiva).

== See also ==
- Colombian Civil War (1860-1862)
