= Bolívar State, Colombia =

State of Colombia

Coordinates: 10.4417°N 75.5133°W

1863 Bolívar State

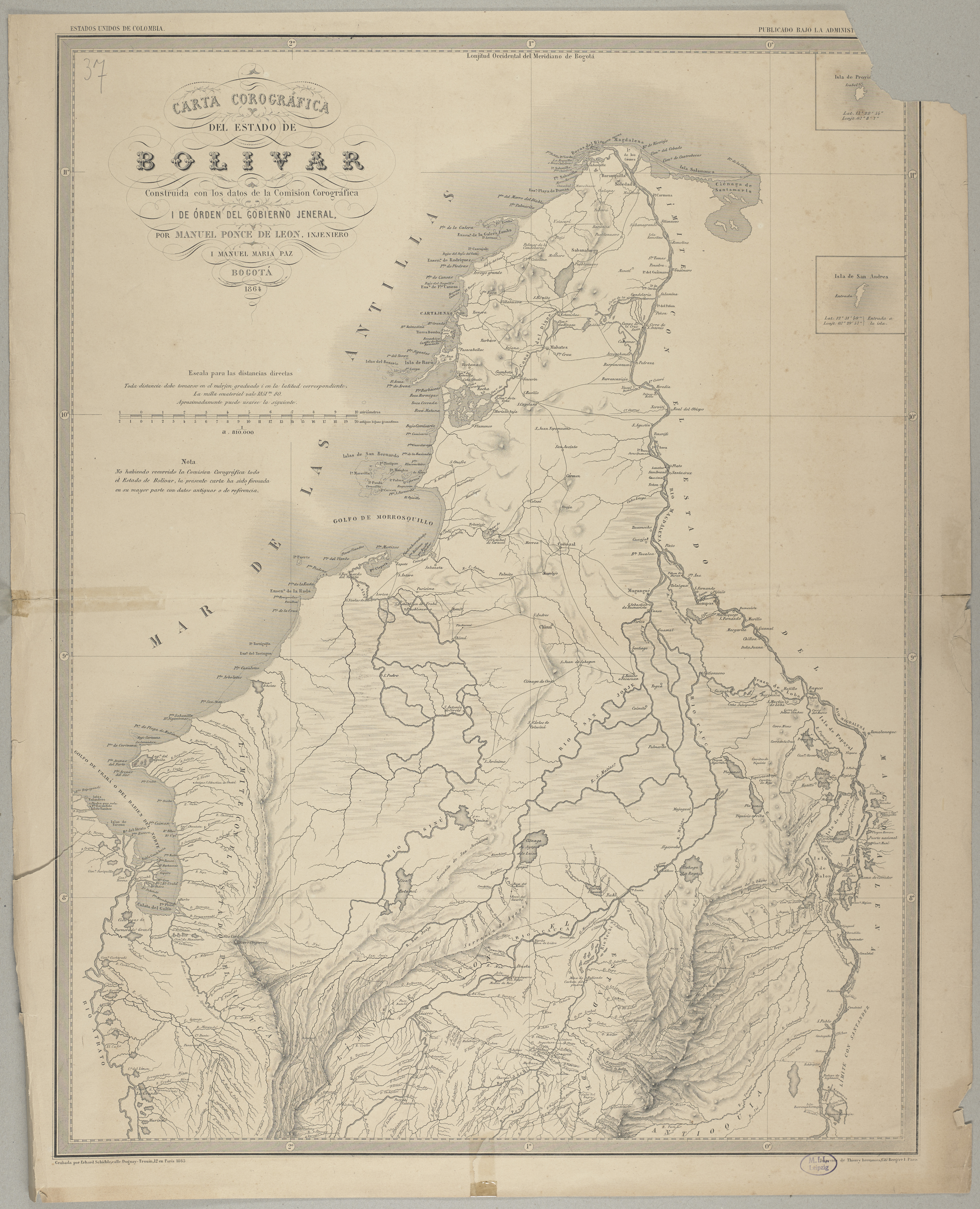
Sovereign State of Bolívar

Bolívar State was one of the states of Colombia, which existed from 1857 until 1886. Today the area of the former state makes up most of modern-day Bolívar Department, Sucre Department, Córdoba Department and Atlántico Department in northern Colombia.

== Limits ==
In 1863, it bordered:

- Antioquia State in the South.
- Cauca State in the West.
- Magdalena State in the East.
- Atlantic Ocean in the North.

== Naming ==
- June 15, 1857: created as Estado Federal de Bolívar (Federal State of Bolívar).
- 1858: recognized as Estado de la Federación in the 1858 constitution of the Granadine Confederation.
- 1863: Estado Soberano de Bolívar (Sovereign State of Bolívar) in the 1863 constitution of the United States of Colombia.

== Subdivisions ==
=== Departments of 1857 ===
On 1857-06-15, it was divided into 5 departments:

- Cartagena Department
- Corozal Department
- Mompox Department
- Sabanilla Department
- Sinú Department

=== Provinces of 1862 ===
By Article 1, Law 26 of December 26, 1862, the Sovereign State of Bolívar was divided into twelve provinces during the government of President of Colombia, Juan José Nieto:

- Barranquilla Province (village of Barranquilla as capital)
- Carmen Province (village of El Carmen de Bolívar as capital)
- Cartagena Province (village of Cartagena de Indias as capital)
- Corozal Province (village of Corozal as capital)
- Chinú Province (village of Chinú as capital)
- Lorica Province (village of Santa Cruz de Lorica as capital)
- Magangué Province (village of Magangué as capital)
- Mahates Province (village of Mahates as capital)
- Mompox Province (village of Santa Cruz de Mompox as capital)
- Nieto Province (village of Ciénaga de Oro as capital)
- Sabanalarga Province (village of Sabanalarga as capital)
- Sincelejo Province (village of Sincelejo as capital)
