= Caquetá Territory =

Coordinates: 1°8′N 76°38′W

The territory within the Republic of New Granada.

1865 map of the territory

The Caquetá Territory (Spanish: Territorio del Caquetá) was a national territory of the Republic of New Granada and the subsequent states of the Granadine Confederation and the United States of Colombia from 1845 to 1886. Its capital was Mocoa.

== History ==
The Caquetá Territory was created on May 2, 1845, as a national territory of the Republic of New Granada. Its territory was carved out of the Popayan Province.

In the 1863 constitution it was made a part of the Cauca State.

In 1886, the territory was disestablished and its lands transferred to Gran Cauca.

== See also ==
- Caquetá Department
