= Neiva Province =

Coordinates: 2°59′N 75°18′W

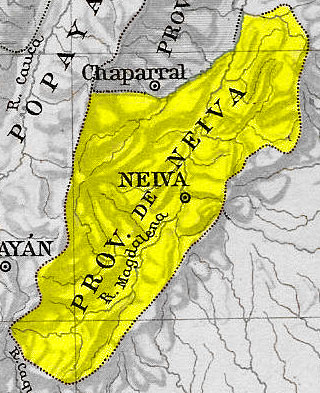

The Province of Neiva, also known as the Governorate of Neiva during the Spanish Empire, was an administrative and territorial entity in New Granada created on 1610 as a corregimiento within the Viceroyalty of Peru. A royal decree (real cédula), issued by king Philip V of Spain on 1717, created the Viceroyalty of New Granada and transferred the province to this new territory.

During the early stages of the Spanish American Wars of Independence (1810-1816), the Province of Neiva declared itself to be a Free State and joined the United Provinces of New Granada. During the period known as Gran Colombia, the province became part of the Department of Cundinamarca, which back then covered all the territory of modern-day Colombia and Panama.

After the dissolution of Gran Colombia, the province joined the Republic of New Granada, a centralist nation, until the federalist system was adopted by New Granada in 1858 and the region became one of the constituent provinces of the Sovereign State of Tolima.
