= Boyacá State =

Coordinates: 5°32′N 73°22′W

1863 Boyacá State

Boyacá State was one of the states of Colombia, which existed from 1857 until 1886.

== Naming ==
- 1857-06-15 created under the name Estado Federal de Boyacá (Federal State of Boyacá).
- 1858 recognized as Estado de la Federación in the 1858 constitution of the Granadine Confederation,
- 1863 Estado Soberano (Sovereign State of Boyacá) in 1863 constitution of the United States of Colombia.
