= Cartagena Province =

1533–1857 province of New Granada

Province of Cartagena Provincia de Cartagena
- Province
- Flag Coat of arms

- Location of Cartagena Province within Colombia
- Coordinates: 10°26′N 75°30′W
- Country: Colombia
- Provincia de Cartagena: February 16, 1533
- Founded by: Pedro de Heredia
- Named after: Cartagena, Spain
- Capital: Cartagena de Indias

Cartagena Province (Spanish: Provincia de Cartagena), also called Gobierno de Cartagena (Government of Cartagena) during the Spanish imperial era, was an administrative and territorial division of New Granada in the Viceroyalty of Peru. It was originally organized on February 16, 1533 as a captaincy general from the central portion of the Province of Tierra Firme. In 1717, King Philip V of Spain issued a royal decree creating the Viceroyalty of New Granada, by which the province was added to the latter.

During the Spanish American wars of independence (1810–33), Cartagena Province was declared a free state and joined to the United Provinces of New Granada, a federation which existed from 1811 to 1816, when it was reconquered by Spain. With the declaration of the former Viceroyalty of New Granada as the short-lived (1819–30) republic of Gran Colombia in 1819, Cartagena province became part of the Magdalena Department which encompassed all of what is now the Caribbean coast of Colombia.

Following the dissolution of Gran Colombia in 1830, the province belonged to the centralist Republic of New Granada until the federal system was introduced in New Granada in 1857; the province then became the Sovereign State of Bolívar.

== History ==
=== Antecedents ===
The region was originally inhabited by the Caribs, an indigenous people who had settled on much of the present-day Colombian Caribbean coast. In 1499, Rodrigo de Bastidas, accompanied by Juan de la Cosa and Vasco Núñez de Balboa, led an expedition to the New World. He mapped the northern coast of South America, discovered Panama, and founded the city of Santa Marta. Cruising off the Colombian coast in 1501, he discovered the mouth of a river he named the Río Magdalena, and landed in the Bay of Cispatá, which he gave the name "Golfo de Barú" (Gulf of Barú). Bastidas cultivated good relations with his Indian neighbors, unlike later Spanish explorers, who encountered fierce resistance from some of the natives. Among these was the conquistador Pedro de Heredia, who founded Cartagena on June 1, 1533, giving it the name "San Sebastian de Calamar".

By the Royal Decree of February 16, 1533, the Magdalena River was set as the eastern border of Cartagena province dividing it from Santa Marta province, while the Atrato River was designated the western border. The first was governed by Pedro Fernández de Lugo, who depended on the Royal Audiencia of Santo Domingo, and the second by Pedro de Heredia, which came under the jurisdiction of the Audiencia of Panama, established in 1533.

=== Spanish domain ===
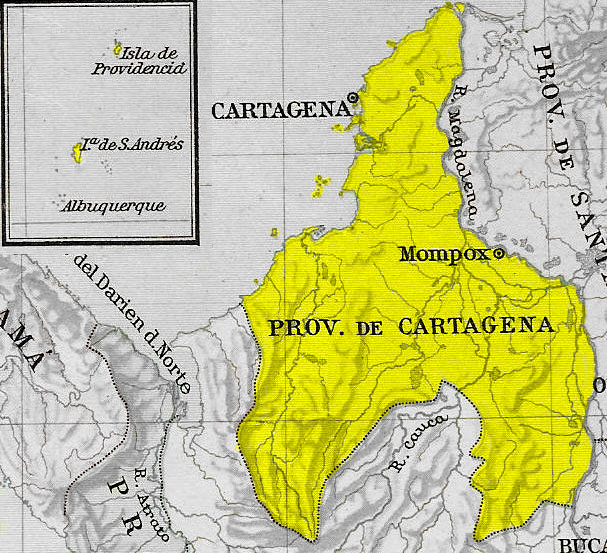

During the Spanish colonial period the city of Cartagena de Indias was one of the most important ports in America. Enormous wealth in the form of gold from the mines of Colombia was shipped out of Cartagena on established sea routes across the Atlantic to the Spanish ports of Cartagena, Cadiz and Seville. The quinto, or "royal fifth" collected by the Spanish Crown, was needed to finance the gigantic enterprise of conquest, as well as various wars fought by Spain in Europe. The city was also a major center of the trade in enslaved black persons brought from the African continent.

In 1536, construction began on the Castillo de San Lázaro, a massive fortress with a series of masonry walls up to 20 meters thick, the most formidable defensive complex of Spanish military architecture to this day. The port was growing in economic importance and strategic value, thanks to the Bay of Cartagena being protected by the Spanish military, as well as its proximity to Panama City, another important Spanish port. In 1538, the Crown authorized the encomienda in the colony; this was a social system that extracted forced labor and tribute from the Indians, whom it deemed "free vassals". The colony was thus converted into a colonial society based on dependency relations with the native peoples.

The Spanish Crown attempted to regulate interactions between the Spanish settlers and natives by issuing the Laws of the Indies (Leyes de Indias), while the Catholic Church established the Inquisition to ensure the primacy of the Catholic faith, given the propensity of slaves to follow non-Christian cults that included forms of witchcraft. In the following years, the founder of the colony, Pedro de Heredia, was jailed for crimes against the native people of the Río Sinú valley, including stripping their tombs of the gold objects buried with their dead. and later sentenced to death. Heredia managed to escape to Spain, but died when his ship was wrecked.

Cartagena de Indias was assaulted several times by pirates, as well as by French, Dutch, and English privateers, including Francis Drake in 1586. Consequently, King Philip II entrusted Marshal Luis de Tejada and the Italian engineer Bautista Antonelli with the task of building the walls and fortified bastion that defended the city in the 17th and 18th centuries (the fortifications of Castillo San Felipe de Barajas are the most completely preserved of those built by the Spaniards in South America). A guard system of zones divided the city into five districts: Santa Catalina, with the cathedral and many Andalusian-style palaces; Santo Toribio, inhabited by traders and the petty bourgeoisie; La Merced, where the headquarters of the fixed battalion was located; San Sebastián, a neighborhood of modest one-story houses, and finally, the suburb of Getsemani, a district of craftsmen and port workers.

In March 1741 the city was besieged by the troops of the British Admiral, Edward Vernon, who arrived with a fleet of 186 ships and 23,600 men (the largest fleet ever assembled up to that time and one that would not be surpassed in size until the Normandy landings in World War II). He launched an assault against the 6 ships and 3,000 men of the garrison, but was repelled by Commander General Blas de Lezo, and finally driven away by Carlos Suillars of Desnaux, a colonel in the Spanish Royal Engineers, and his men.

=== Emancipation ===
In 1810, the Viceroyalty of New Granada consisted of 15 provinces, including that of Cartagena. While Veraguas, Panamá and Riohacha provinces remained under Spanish rule, the junta (governing board) of Santa Marta had the most royalists. In Popayán the people were initially loyal to Spain, but then rallied to the independence movement, recently triumphant in Cali. In Girón, Santander, the influential Catholic priest, Eloy de Valenzuela, although a Criollo, remained royalist.

Cartagena, one of the principal cities in the New World Spanish Empire, was one of the first to rebel against the Spanish yoke. In the early 19th century, a few white Criollos, e.g., locally born people of Spanish ancestry, were given a classical education, some of them in Santa Fe, and a few even in Europe, and had begun to excel in literature and the arts, as well as professions such as medicine, law and the natural sciences. In the course of their studies, they had been exposed to liberal ideas of liberty and equality, and as they increasingly developed an identity as Hispanic Americans, they chafed at their secondary status in the Spanish colonial caste system to the Peninsulares, or Spanish-born Spaniards. Consequently, many of the Criollos began to think it was time to take the reins of government into their own hands, whatever the outcome of the war with Spain that was sure to result. They did not act immediately, however, as they awaited the right moment to strike. Meanwhile, the long-established colonial social order in Cartagena was being undermined by the ideas of the libertarians (meaning the patriotic defenders of liberty). The final blow to bring down the royalist government, the coup de grace dreamed of by the patriots, would not be accomplished easily, as the city was a formidable base of Spanish power, and had entrenched political, military, religious and administrative bureaucracies.

The administrative apparatus of Cartagena was complex and difficult to penetrate, but the Criollos continued to conspire and form their plans while waiting for the expected moment to act. In this they had the support and leadership of the two local mayors, Dr. José María García de Toledo and Miguel Diaz Granados. In early May 1810, Antonio Villavicencio, a Criollo aristocrat born in Quito and brought up in Bogotá, arrived at Cartagena de Indias.

Villavicencio, whom the Consejo Real (Royal Council) of Spain had commissioned to persuade the restless criollos of the New Kingdom of Granada to swear allegiance to King Ferdinand VII of Spain, was gradually won over to the cause of independence. He wrote a letter to the Viceroy of New Granada explaining that one of the chief grievances of the criollo elites was that they felt virtually excluded from service in the state bureaucracy by the practical difficulty of travelling to Spain to secure an appointment.

The people of Cartagena demanded that the Cabildo (council) decide the matter, and on May 22, 1810, it met and swore fidelity to the Regency Council, but at the same time it constituted a governing body for the province, a junta, to be chaired by Governor Francisco de Montes and two councillors. This session of the cabildo of Cartagena, an important milestone in Colombian history, marks the beginning of the struggle for independence.

The city's criollo merchants wanted the freedom to trade with other countries besides Spain, and in response the junta opened the port to the ships of all nations. On June 14, 1810, the most ardent of the nationalists in the cabildo launched a coup with the help of the black and mulatto militia from the Getsamani barrio (neighborhood). Governor Montes, whom they accused of being a Francophile (afrancesado), was deposed and deported to Havana, and replaced by Col. Blas de Soria.

Villavicencio had been sent as a representative of the Spanish Crown to New Granada, and the people of Santa Fe de Bogotá used his arrival as an excuse to start their own revolt, known as the Florero de Llorente, which culminated in a proclamation of independence from Spain. After this incident Villavicencio resigned his office and joined the cause of independence. He was later captured and became the first martyr executed during the reign of terror of the Spanish general Pablo Morillo.

A Supreme Governing Junta, chaired by the merchant José María García de Toledo, was established on August 13. On February 4, 1811, the royalists tried a counterattack in Cartagena but failed. By mid-1811, the patriots were already being undermined by internal divisions; they had formed two parties that argued furiously, and the general mood was contentious. Several major skirmishes between them, both military and political, delayed by several months the declaration of independence. At last a constitutional convention met to establish a sovereign state, and on November 11, 1811, declared the Estado Libre de Cartagena (the Free State of Cartagena).

=== Reconquest and independence ===
During 1812 the people of the Caribbean provinces in New Granada remained mostly royalist. Those in the Santa Marta region had built strongholds at Tenerife and Chiriguana on the Magdalena River, leading the revolutionaries of Cartagena to burn the towns. On August 14, 1813, insurgent forces from Cartagena attacked Santa Marta itself, but were repulsed by a flank of royalist defenders near the city. With the defeat of Napoleon in 1814 and the return of Ferdinand VII to the throne, the Spanish authorities, at the behest of the king, decided to send troops to the Americas to reclaim the territories that had proclaimed themselves independent. From the point of view of the criollos, the king was ignoring the loyalty the American provinces had shown when he was in exile in France, and now he was asserting his right to govern as an absolute ruler.

The capture of Gen. Antonio Nariño by royalist troops at Pasto in May 1814 inflamed the civil war in New Granada. Simón Bolívar returned from exile and took command of the army of the United Provinces. On December 11, he defeated the rebel Centralist troops of Cundinamarca, and then marched on royalist Santa Marta. The patriots of Cartagena were suspicious of Bolívar's motives and declined to send him reinforcements, so he attacked that city on March 29. 1815, and fought in several skirmishes against its anti-royalist defenders until May 8, when the Liberador suddenly resigned his commission and went into exile in Jamaica. Soon thereafter news arrived in Cartagena of the landing of Gen. Pablo Morillo in Venezuela on March 27 with a detachment of 10,500 Spanish soldiers, sent to restore the rule of the viceroyalty. Morillo advanced to Cartagena, and on August 15 began a siege of the city that continued for three months, inflicting hunger, disease and high mortality on the insurgents. The desperate rebels decided to fight the Spaniards to the death. As a result of this episode, the city would receive the title of "Heroic City". Morillo entered Cartagena on December 6, 1815, two days after the city swore allegiance to Ferdinand VII.

== Geography ==
=== Boundaries ===
The boundaries of the province were not stable over the period of Spanish rule in the region. Limited knowledge of the territory's geography and its incomplete exploration did not permit the certain demarcation of borders between the governorates, except in the case of identifiable natural topographical features, such as the Magdalena River, which defined the border with the province of Santa Marta. The colonial province of Cartagena included the territories of the present-day Colombian departments of Bolivar, Atlántico, Sucre and Córdoba, and after 1808, the island departments of San Andrés and Providencia, as well as the Mosquito Coast and the Mangrove Islands of present-day Nicaragua. With the proclamation of independence in 1811, Cartagena was surrounded by the following provinces (in clockwise order on the map): Santa Marta, Socorro and Antioquia. The boundaries between the provinces were not entirely clear, since they were never explicitly defined.

=== Topography ===
The Province of Cartagena occupied much of what is now the Caribbean coast of Colombia. The territory of the province was amorphous in shape, with borders that followed an undulating line edged by the foothills of the Andes Mountains to the south, consisting of the Abibe, San Lucas, Ayapel and San Jerónimo mountains, running west along the Serrania del Darien and east along the Magdalena River.

The land was crossed by a number of rivers, creeks and streams. These bodies of water supported various economic activities and were used for communication and trade with other regions, the Cauca and Magdalena rivers being of special significance, with much of the goods produced by the interior of New Granada transported to Cartagena on them.

=== Territorial divisions ===
The territory of Cartagena province had different administrative subdivisions over the course of its history. At first it was subdivided into partidos, which in the late colonial period were known as jurisdicciones (jurisdictions). In 1675 the province included the partidos of Cartagena, Mompós and Tolu, while in 1776 the province was divided into the five partidos of Cartagena de Indias, Tierradentro, Mahates, Barranca, Tolu and Mompós. With the advent of independence, the boundaries of the old jurisdictions were changed, with the new subdivisions being called cantones (cantons). Many of the inhabitants were not happy with these changes, and consequently, usage of some of the new iterations wes suppressed. In 1825 the province was divided into the cantons of Cartagena de Indias, Barranca nueva, Carmen, Mompós, Simití and Tolu, then in 1835 it was divided into the cantons of Cartagena, Barranquilla, Corozal, Chinú, Lorica, Mahates, Sabanalarga, San Andrés and Soledad. These were all subdivided into parishes and villages.

=== Demographics ===
Population of Cartagena Province (1778–1834)
Year	Population
1778	118,382
1779	118,685
1780	119,647
1808	170,000
1825	121,663
1834	157,075

The table shows the data used by Calderón indicating the approximate population of the province at the time of each census in the New Kingdom of Granada, taken successively when new taxes were levied by the Spanish crown.

According to data supplied by the viceregal secretary Francisco Silvestre in his book Descripción del Reino de Santafé de Bogotá (Description of the Kingdom of Santafé de Bogota), in 1789 the population of the province amounted to 119,647 inhabitants, and in 1835, the province had 130,324 inhabitants.

According to the census of 1851, the province had 151,950 inhabitants, of whom 73,706 were men and 78,244 were women.

The indigenous population in the territory of Cartagena Province at the time of the Spanish conquest was about 100,000, but due to continuous reduction of their numbers, mainly by introduced diseases and the harsh conditions of forced labor that many of them endured, from first contact with the Spaniards in 1502 to 1570 their number had been reduced to only about 22,500.
