= Cundinamarca State =

1857–1886 state of Colombia

Coordinates: 4°39′N 74°3′W

1863 Cundinamarca State

Cundinamarca State was one of the states of Colombia. It was created on 15 June 1857 as Estado Federal de Cundinamarca (Federal State of Cundinamarca). In 1858, it was recognized as Estado de la Federación, and in the constitution of 1863, it was renamed Estado Soberano (Sovereign State of Cundinamarca) of the United States of Colombia. It was abolished in 1886.

== Subdivisions ==
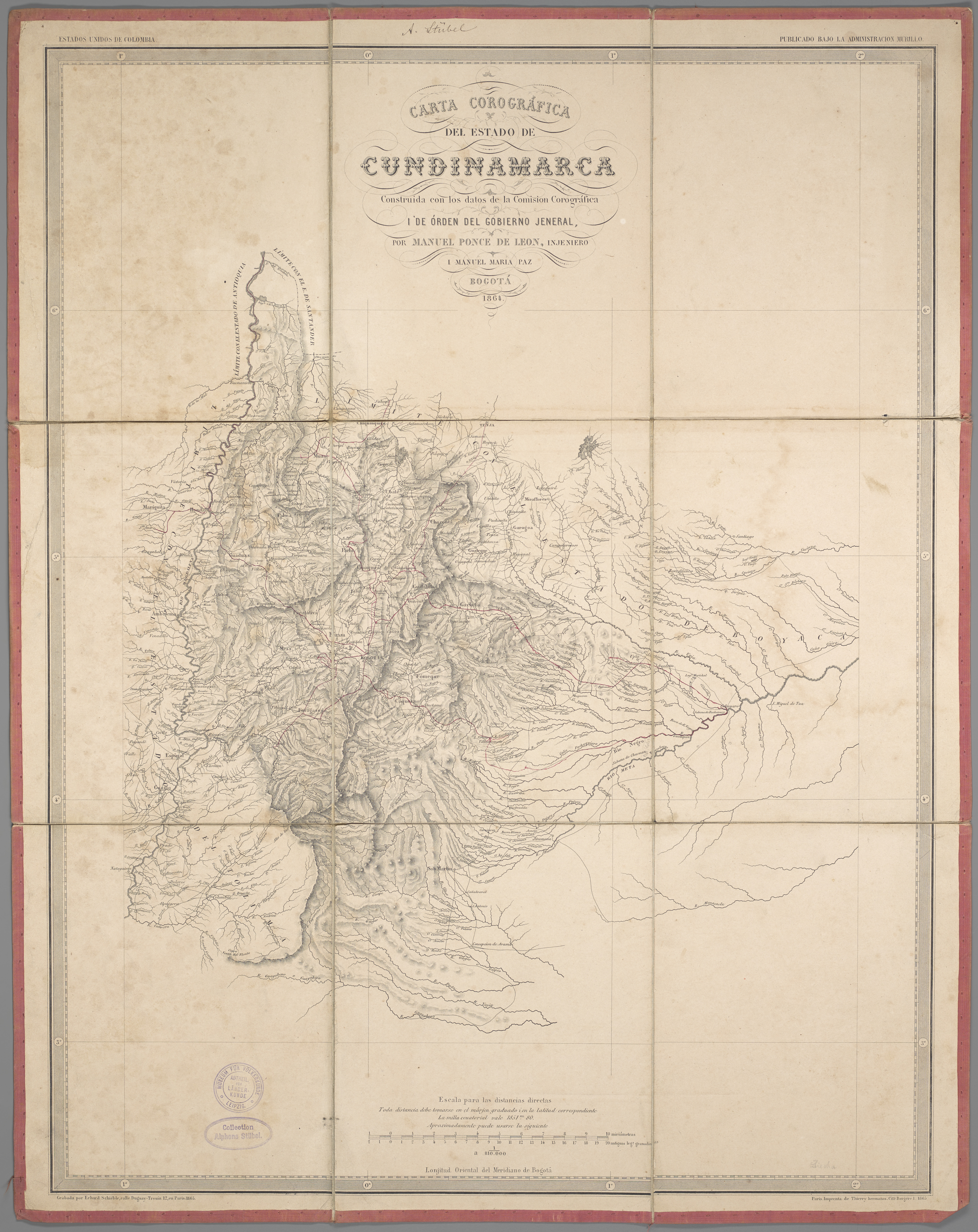
Sovereign State of Cundinamarca

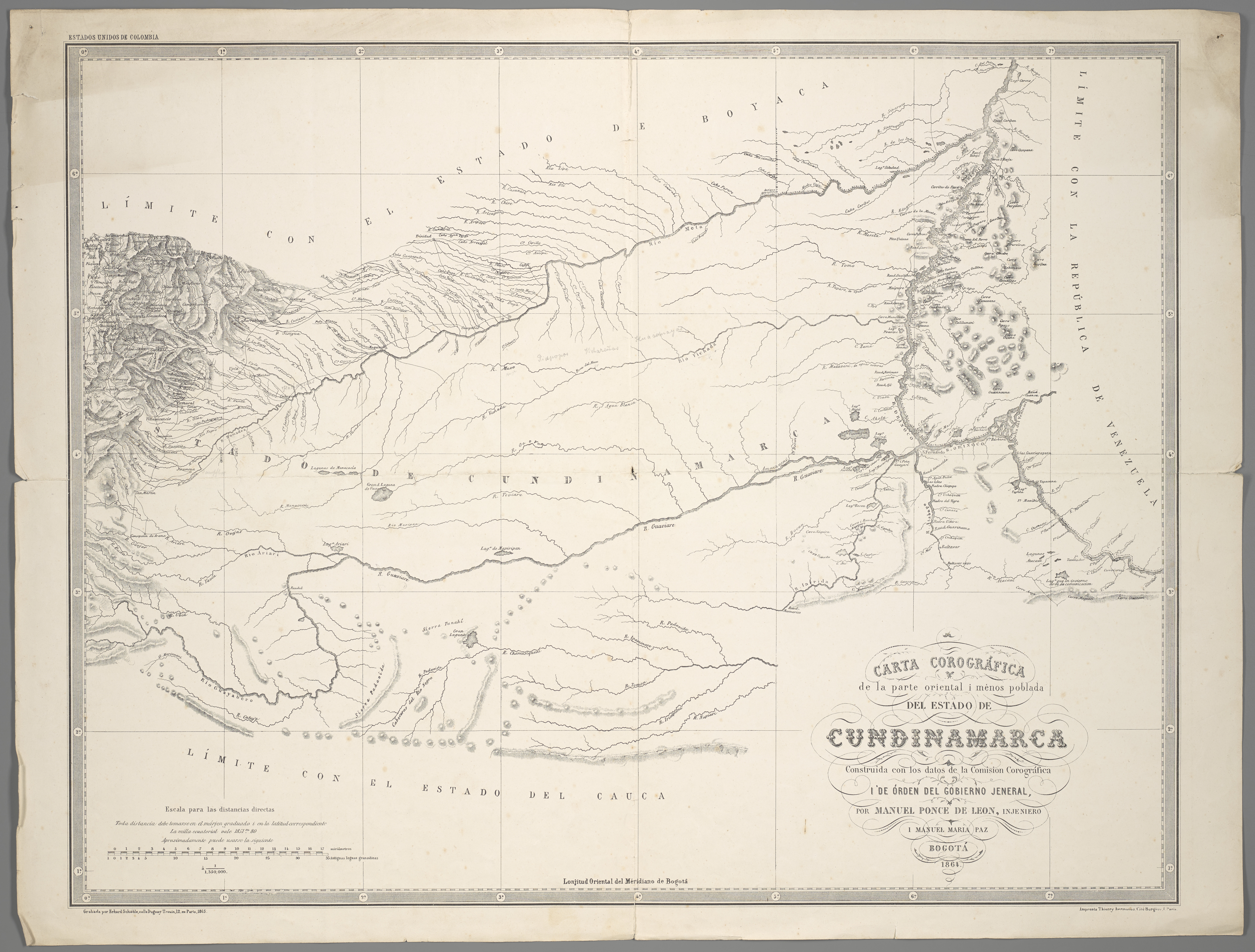
San Martín Territory

Under the law of 15 June 1857, the state was divided into 8 departments, but in 1858, most were abolished, leaving only Bogotá Department, Neiva Department, Mariquita Department, and San Martín Territory.

Later, in 1861, Mariquita Department and Neiva Department were separated to form Tolima State.

=== Departments of 1862 ===
By the law of 25 August 1862, the state was divided into 7 departamentos:

- Bogotá Department
- Cáqueza Department
- Chocontá Department
- Guatavita Department
- Guaduas Department
- Tequendama Department
- Zipaquirá Department

=== Departments of 1874 ===
For the year 1874, the number of departments remained the same, but some had been eliminated and others created:

- Bogotá Department (capital Bogotá)
- Cáqueza Department (capital Fómeque)
- Facatativá Department (capital Facatativá)
- La Palma Department (capital La Palma)
- Tequendama Department (capital La Mesa)
- Ubaté Department (capital Ubaté)
- Zipaquirá Department (capital Zipaquirá)

San Martín Territory, with its capital in Villavicencio, was part of Bogotá Department but under the administration of the national government.
