= Cauca State =

Former state of Colombia

Coordinates: 2.45°N 76.6167°W

1863 Cauca State

1865 Sovereign State of Cauca

Cauca State was one of the states of Colombia, which existed from 1857 until 1886.

Today the area of the former state makes up most of modern-day west and southern Colombia, with some portion of its vast territories acquired by present-day Peru, Brazil, Ecuador and Venezuela.

== Naming ==
- 15 June 1857 created as Estado Federal del Cauca (Federal State of Cauca).
- 1858 recognized as Estado de la Federación in the 1858 constitution of the Granadine Confederation,
- 1863 named Estado Soberano del Cauca (Sovereign State of Cauca) in the 1863 constitution of the United States of Colombia.

Known as "Gran Cauca", because it was the largest and richest of the Union.

== Subdivisions ==
On 15 June 1857 law, the state was divided into the following provinces

- Barbacoas Province (capital Barbacoas).
- Buenaventura Province (capital Cali).
- Chocó Province (capital Quibdó).
- Cauca Province (capital Buga).
- Pasto Province (capital San Juan de Pasto).
- Popayán Province (capital Popayán).
- Túquerres Province (capital Ipiales).
- Caquetá Territory (capital Mocoa).

In 1858, the setup was changed, Barbacoas and Túquerres were added to Pasto:

- Buenaventura Province (capital Cali).
- Chocó Province (capital Quibdó).
- Cauca Province (capital Buga).
- Pasto Province (capital San Juan de Pasto).
- Popayán Province (capital Popayán).
- Caquetá Territory (capital Mocoa).

In 1874, the provinces had been changed into municipalities and the number increased to 16:

- Atrato (capital Quibdó).
- Barbacoas (capital Barbacoas).
- Buenaventura (capital Buenaventura).
- Buga (capital Buga).
- Caldas (capital Almaguer).
- Cali (capital Cali).
- Obando (capital Ipiales).
- Palmira (capital Palmira).
- Pasto (capital San Juan de Pasto).
- Popayán (capital Popayán).
- Quindío (capital Cartago).
- Santander (capital Santander de Quilichao).
- San Juan (capital Nóvita).
- Toro (capital Toro).
- Tulúa (capital Tuluá).
- Túquerres (capital Túquerres).

== See also ==
- Colombian Civil War (1860-1862)
