= Magdalena State =

Coordinates: 11.253°N 70.2167°W

1863 Magdalena State

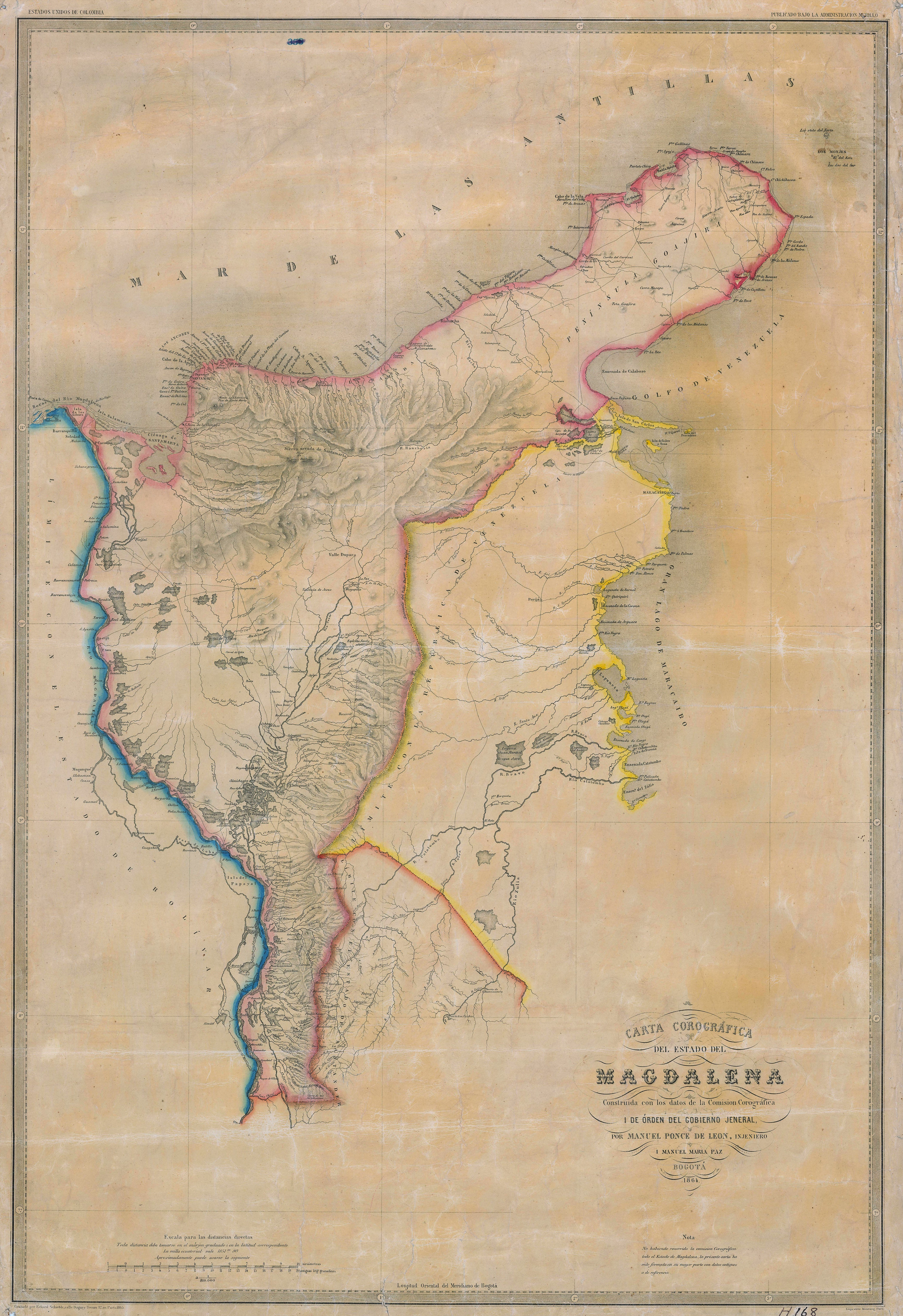
Sovereign State of Magdalena

The Magdalena State (Spanish: Estado del Magdalena) was one of the states of Colombia, which existed from 1863 until 1886. Today the area of the former state makes up most of modern-day areas of the departments of Magdalena, Cesar and La Guajira, northern Colombia.

== Provinces ==
- El Banco Province (capital Aguachica)
- Padilla Province (capital Riohacha)
- Santa Marta Province (capital Santa Marta)
- Tenerife Province (capital Tenerife)
- Valledupar Province (capital Valledupar)

== See also ==
- Colombian Civil War (1860–1862)
