= Provinces of Gran Colombia =

Provinces of Gran Colombia in 1824.

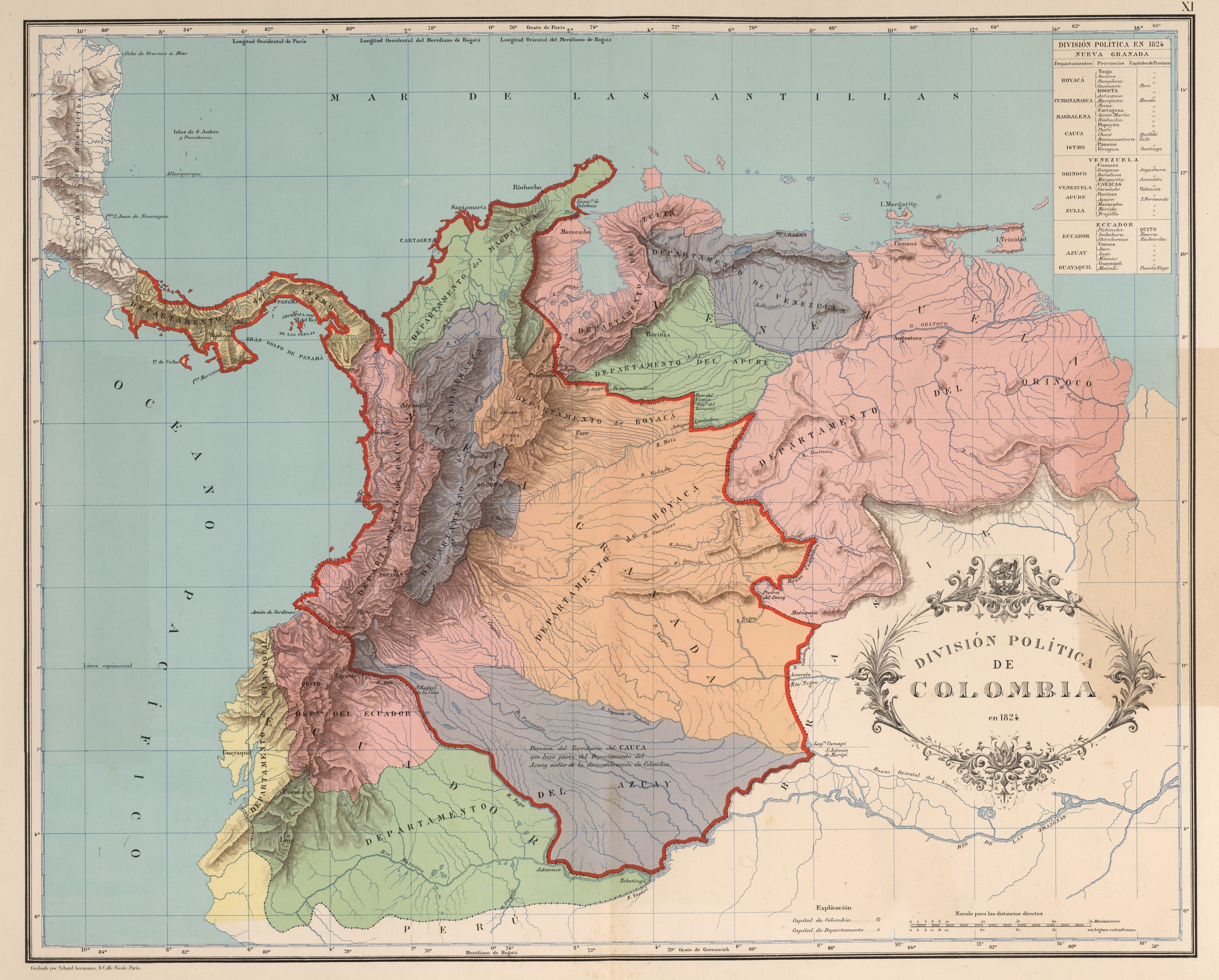
1824 map of 3 districts and 37 provinces.

The 37 provinces and their departments, in the Republic of Gran Colombia from 1824 to 1831.

Gran Colombia was a country in northern South America from 1819 to 1831. Its subdivisions were redrawn in 1824, from the original 3 departments into 3 districts with departments and provinces.

Province	Department	District
Barinas Province	Apure Department	Norte
Achaguas Province	Apure Department	Norte
Cumaná Province	Orinoco Department	Norte
Barcelona Province	Orinoco Department	Norte
Guayana Province	Orinoco Department	Norte
Margarita Province	Orinoco Department	Norte
Caracas Province	Venezuela Department	Norte
Carabobo Province	Venezuela Department	Norte
Maracaibo Province	Zulia Department	Norte
Coro Province	Zulia Department	Norte
Mérida Province	Zulia Department	Norte
Trujillo Province	Zulia Department	Norte
Tunja Province	Boyacá Department	Centro
Casanare Province	Boyacá Department	Centro
Pamplona Province	Boyacá Department	Centro
Socorro Province	Boyacá Department	Centro
Popayán Province	Cauca Department	Centro
Buenaventura Province	Cauca Department	Centro
Chocó Province	Cauca Department	Centro
Pasto Province	Cauca Department	Centro
Bogotá Province	Cundinamarca Department	Centro
Antioquia Province	Cundinamarca Department	Centro
Mariquita Province	Cundinamarca Department	Centro
Neiva Province	Cundinamarca Department	Centro
Istmo Province	Istmo Department	Centro
Veraguas Province	Istmo Department	Centro
Cartagena Province	Magdalena Department	Centro
Riohacha Province	Magdalena Department	Centro
Santa Marta Province	Magdalena Department	Centro
Cuenca Province	Azuay Department	Sur
Loja Province	Azuay Department	Sur
Jaén de Bracamoros y Maynas Province	Azuay Department	Sur
Guayaquil Province	Guayaquil Department	Sur
Manabí Province	Guayaquil Department	Sur
Pichincha Province	Ecuador Department	Sur
Chimborazo Province	Ecuador Department	Sur
Imbabura Province	Ecuador Department	Sur

== See also ==
- Subdivisions of Gran Colombia — districts, departments, & provinces.
