= Subdivisions of Gran Colombia =

The Republic of Gran Colombia was a former independent country in northern South America, a post-Spanish colonial country that existed from 1819 to 1831. Its initial subdivisions, created in 1820, were revised and expanded in 1824 to 12 departments.

== 1820 Departments ==
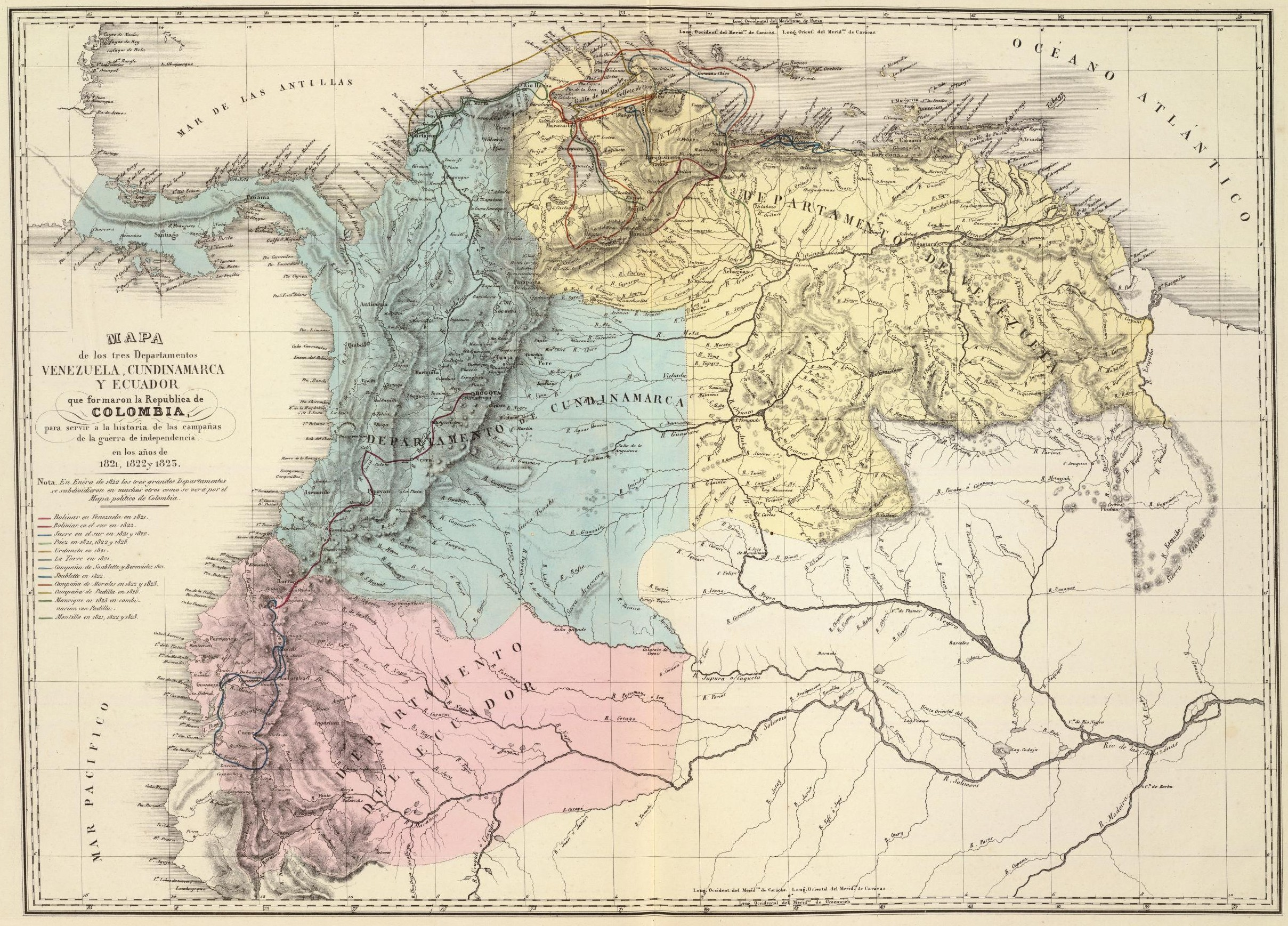
Gran Colombia departments in 1820 (not including disputed Mosquito Coast).

The initial country subdivision of Gran Colombia was into three departments, without larger districts or smaller provinces. They were:

- Cundinamarca Department
- Quito Department
- Venezuela Department

== 1824 districts, departments, and provinces ==
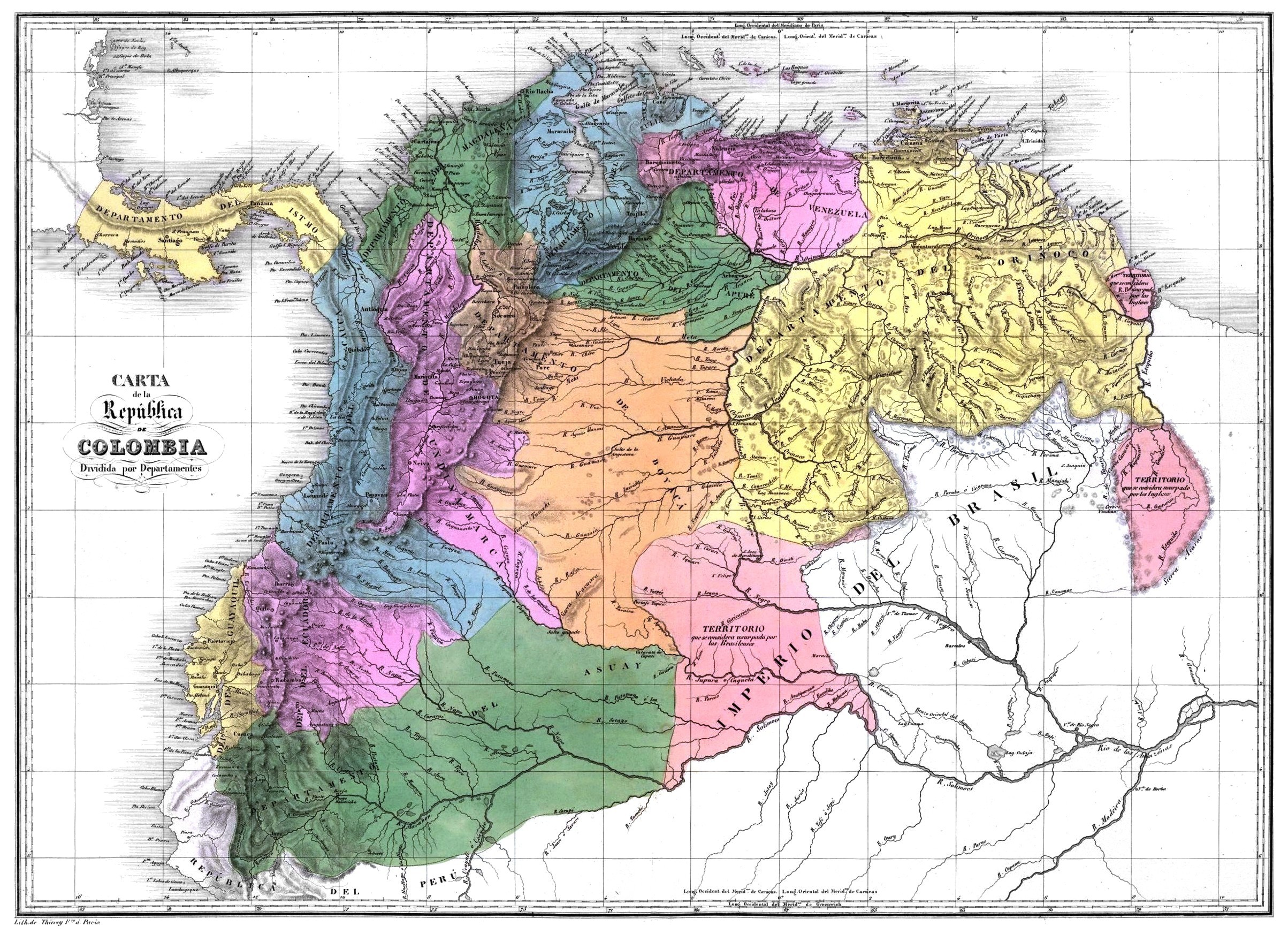
Gran Colombia departments in 1824 (not including disputed Mosquito Coast).

=== Northern District ===
The Northern District (Spanish: Distrito del Norte) was in present-day Venezuela and Brazil. Its departments and provinces were:

- Apure Department: 2 provinces — Barinas Province and Achaguas Province.
- Orinoco Department: 4 provinces — Cumaná Province, Barcelona Province, Guayana Province and Margarita Province.
- Venezuela Department: 2 provinces — Caracas Province and Carabobo Province.
- Zulia Department: 4 provinces — Maracaybo/Maracaibo, Coro Province, Mérida Province and Trujillo Province.

=== Central District ===
The Central District (Spanish: Distrito del Centro) was in present-day Colombia and Panama. Its departments and provinces were:

- Boyaca Department: 4 provinces — Tunja Province, Casanare Province, Pamplona Province, and Socorro Province.
- Cauca Department: 4 provinces — Popayán Province, Buenaventura Province, Chocó Province, Pasto Province.
- Cundinamarca Department: 4 provinces — Bogotá Province, Antioquia Province, Mariquita Province, Neiva Province.
- Isthmus Department (now Panama): 2 provinces — Isthmus Province and Veraguas Province.
- Magdalena Department: 3 provinces — Cartagena Province, Riohacha Province, Santa Marta Province.

Control of the south-eastern portion of the Mosquito Coast was disputed with the British and the Federal Republic of Central America.

=== Southern District ===
The Southern District (Spanish: Distrito del Sur) was in present-day Ecuador, and north of Marañón River in present-day Peru. Its departments and provinces were:

- Azuay Department: 3 provinces — Cuenca Province, Loja Province, Jaén de Bracamoros y Maynas Province.
- Guayaquil Department: 2 provinces — Guayaquil Province and Manabí Province.
- Ecuador Department: 3 provinces — Pichincha Province, Chimborazo Province and Imbabura Province.

== Maps of subdivisions ==
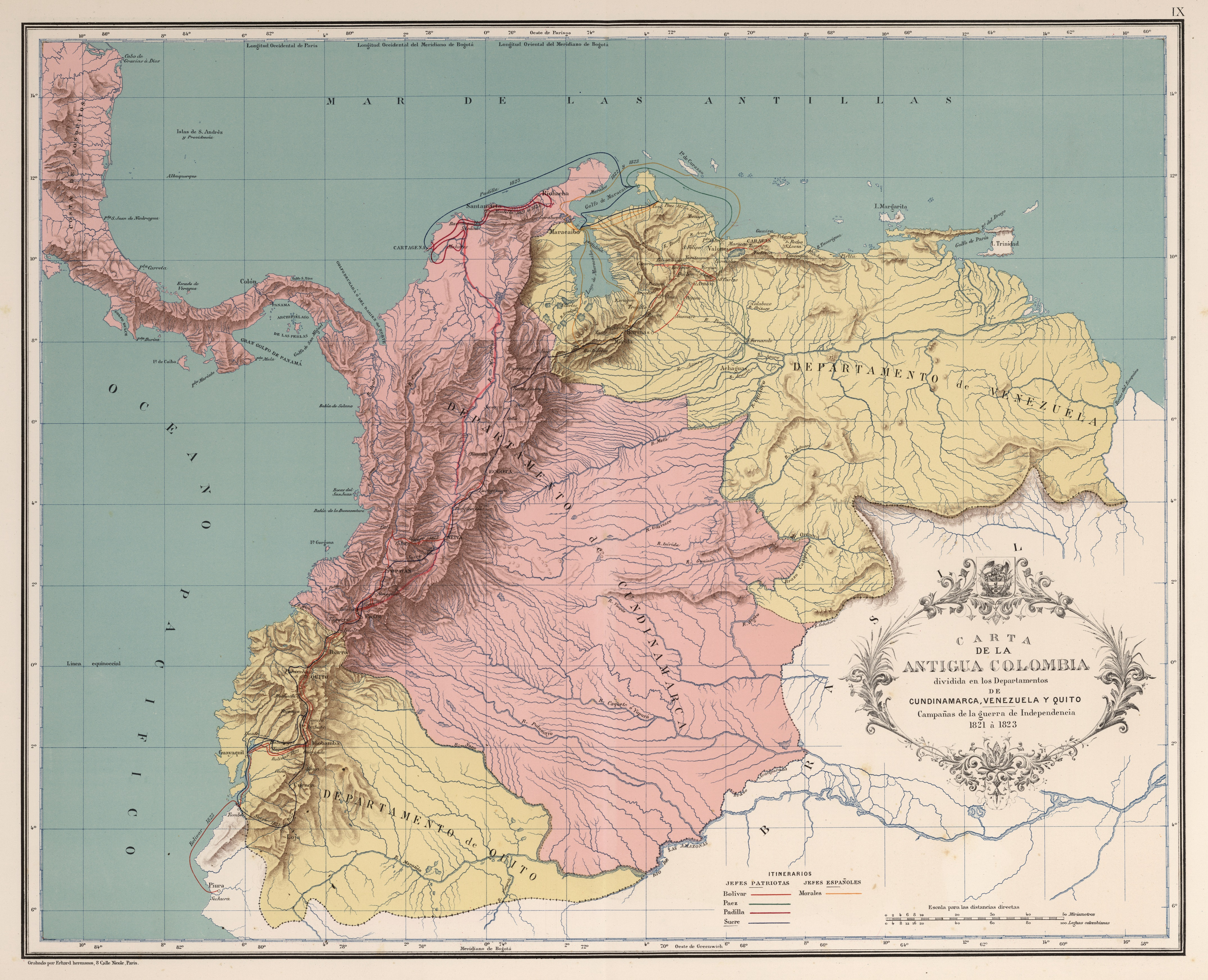
3 departments in 1820: Quito, Cundinamarca, Venezuela

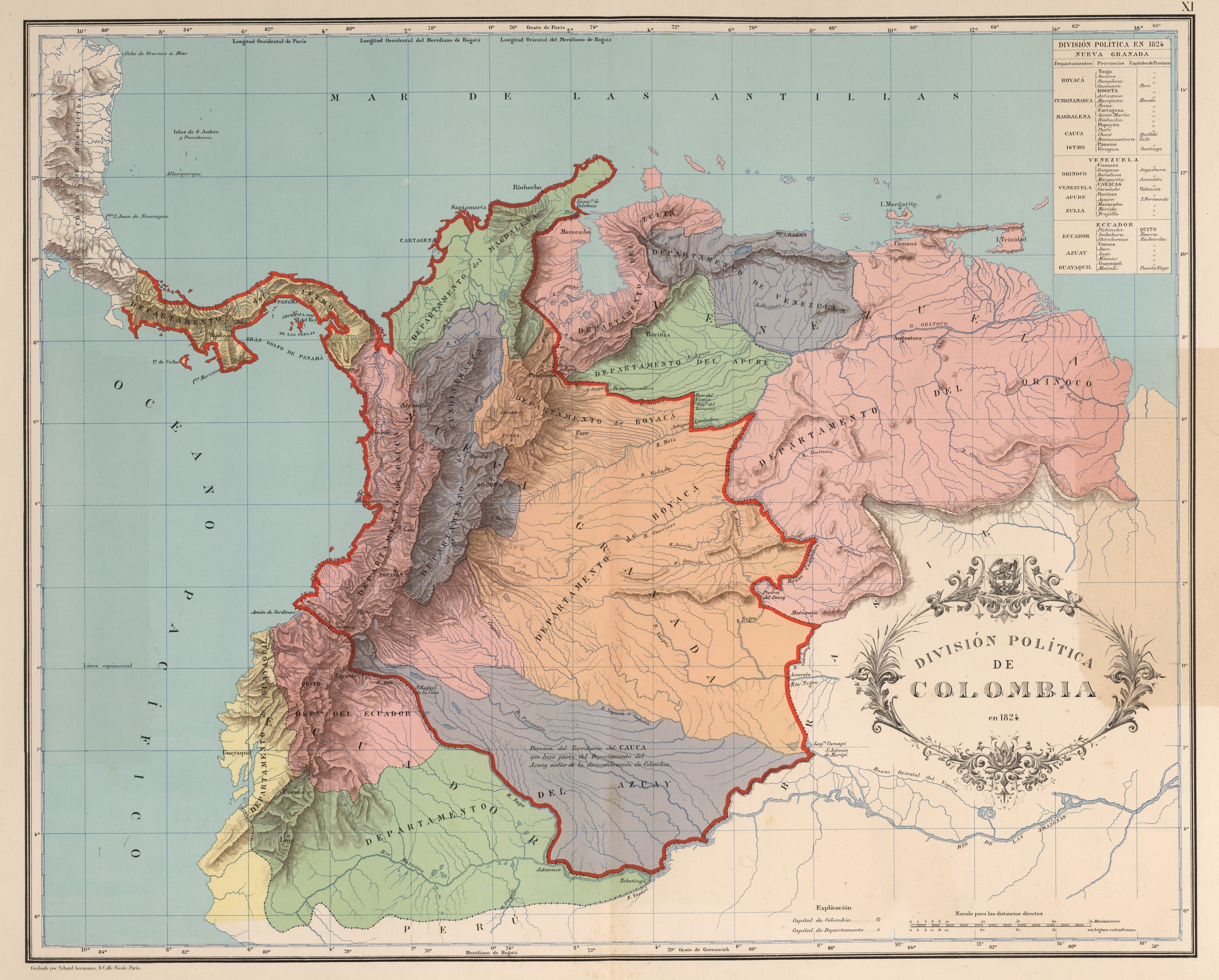
12 departments in 1824

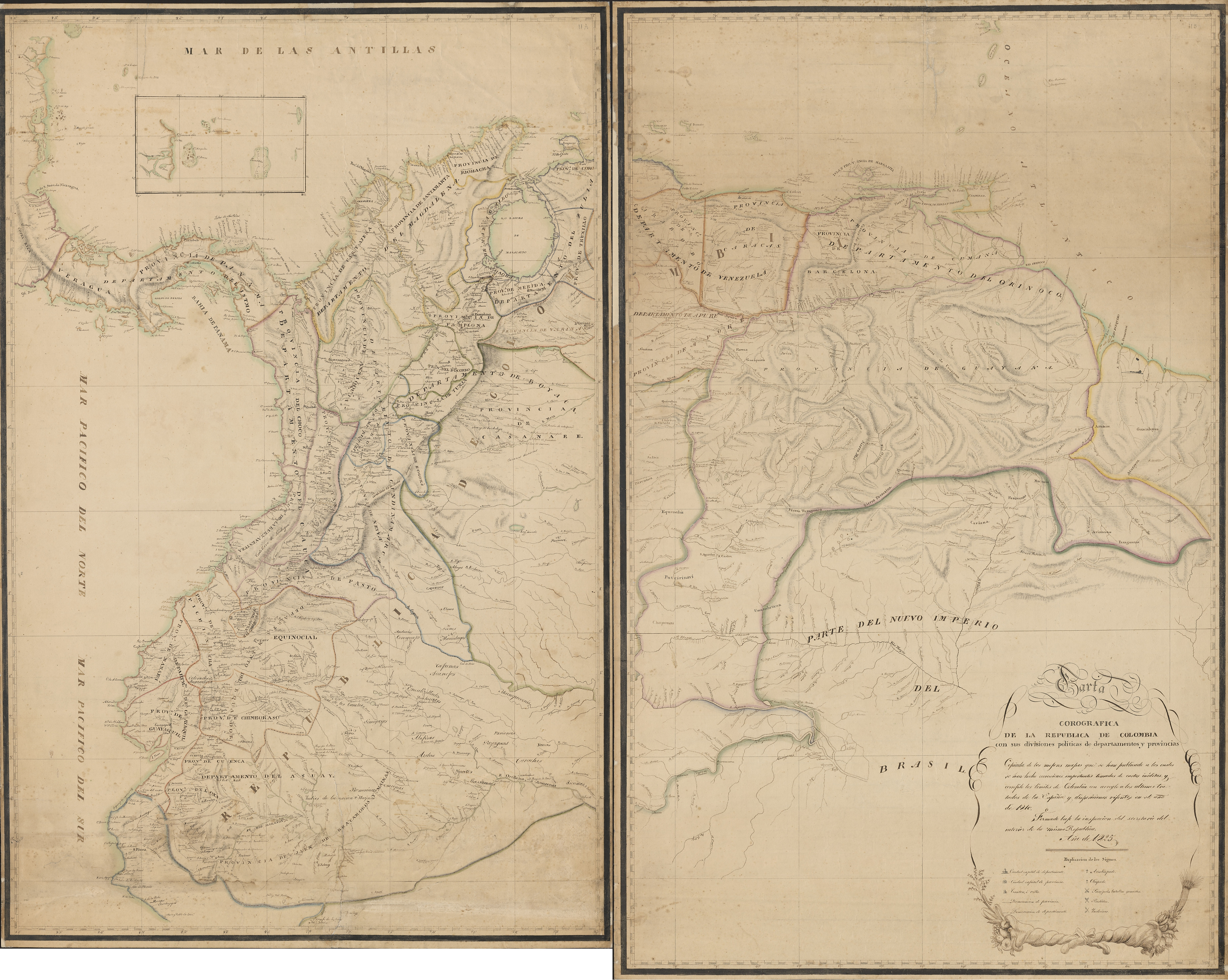
Gran Colombia in 1825

== See also ==
- Provinces of Gran Colombia
- Departments of Colombia — in present day country.
