= Provinces of the Republic of New Granada =

Political division of the Republic of New Granada in 1832

According to the constitution of 1832, the territory of the Republic of New Granada was divided into provinces. Each province was composed of one or more cantons, and each canton is several divided into districts parish.

The provinces in 1832 were the same that made the Granadine Convention the same year and ratifying the constitution gave the republic. These were:

| # | Province | Capital |
|---|---|---|
| 1 | Antioquia | Medellín |
| 2 | Barbacoas | Barbacoas |
| 3 | Cartagena | Cartagena |
| 4 | Casanare | Pore |
| 5 | Mariquita | Mariquita |
| 6 | Pamplona | Pamplona |
| 7 | Panamá | Panamá |
| 8 | Pasto | San Juan de Pasto |
| 9 | Popayán | Popayán |
| 10 | Rio Hacha | Riohacha |
| 11 | Santa Fe | Bogotá |
| 12 | Santa Marta | Santa Marta |
| 13 | Socorro | Socorro |
| 14 | Tunja | Tunja |
| 15 | Vélez | Vélez |
| 16 | Veragua | Santiago de Veraguas |

== Provinces 1851 ==
Political division of the Republic of New Granada in 1851

For the year 1851 the changes of government and political-economic ideologies of these, added to the existing strong regional trends, led to the division of the republic in 36 provinces, which were:

| # | Province | Capital |
|---|---|---|
| 1 | Antioquia | Antioquia |
| 2 | Azuero | Los Santos |
| 3 | Barbacoas | Barbacoas |
| 4 | Bogotá | Bogotá |
| 5 | Buenaventura | Cali |
| 6 | Casanare | Pore |
| 7 | Cartagena | Cartagena |
| 8 | Cauca | Buga |
| 9 | Chiriquí | David |
| 10 | Chocó | Quibdó |
| 11 | Córdoba | Rionegro |
| 12 | Cundinamarca | Gachetá |
| 13 | García Róvira | Málaga |
| 14 | Mariquita | Mariquita |
| 15 | Medellín | Medellín |
| 16 | Mompóx | Mompóx |
| 17 | Neiva | Neiva |
| 18 | Ocaña | Ocaña |
| 19 | Pamplona | Pamplona |
| 20 | Panamá | Panamá |
| 21 | Pasto | San Juan de Pasto |
| 22 | Popayán | Popayán |
| 23 | Rio Hacha | Riohacha |
| 24 | Sabanilla | Barranquilla |
| 25 | Santa Marta | Santa Marta |
| 26 | Santander | Cúcuta |
| 27 | Socorro | Socorro |
| 28 | Soto | Piedecuesta |
| 29 | Tequendama | Fusagasugá |
| 30 | Tunja | Tunja |
| 31 | Tundama | Santa Rosa |
| 32 | Túquerres | Ipiales |
| 33 | Valle de Upar | Valledupar |
| 34 | Vélez | Vélez |
| 35 | Veragua | Santiago de Veraguas |
| 36 | Zipaquirá | Zipaquirá |

== Territories ==
Likewise, the Republic cover some territories in the peripheries of the country:

- Caquetá Territory, capital in Mocoa
- San Martín Territory, capital in San Martín, between Meta River y Guaviare River.
- Mosquito Coast: While through the Royal Decree of 20 November 1803 it became part of New Granada, it never had an effective control over it as being under British rule. Legally dependent on the Cartagena Province. Still, in 1841 the government arrested and expelled an expedition of British settlers to Nueva Segovia (River Bluefields) that had arrived in 1841 on Little Catherine, having been granted title to land by the King of the Muskitos.
- San Andrés and Providencia, also became part of New Granada by the same royal decree that transferred the Mosquito Coast of the Captaincy General of Guatemala to the Viceroyalty of New Granada. Depended on the Cartagena Province.

== Creation of states ==
Seven states of Colombia were created out of the provinces from 1855 to 1857, with another created in 1858 after New Granada became the Granadine Confederation.
