= Second Republic of Venezuela =

Reestablished Venezuelan Republic declared by Simón Bolívar

Coordinates: 10°05′N 67°32′W

Republic of Venezuela República de Venezuela (Spanish)
- 1813–1814
- Flag Coat of arms

- Yellow - pro-independence patriots Red - pro-monarchy royalists
- Status: Unrecognized state
- Capital: Caracas
- Common languages: Spanish
- Government: Unitary presidential republic
- President
  - 1813–1814: Simón Bolívar
- Historical era: Spanish American wars of independence
  - Admirable Campaign: 7 August 1813
  - Loss of Caracas: 16 July 1814
- ISO 3166 code: VE
Preceded by	Succeeded by
Captaincy General of Venezuela; First Republic of Venezuela	Captaincy General of Venezuela; Third Republic of Venezuela

The Second Republic of Venezuela (Spanish: Segunda República de Venezuela) is the name used to refer to the reestablished Venezuelan Republic declared by Simón Bolívar on 7 August 1813. This declaration followed the defeat of Domingo Monteverde by Bolívar during the Admirable Campaign in the west and Santiago Mariño in his campaign in the east.

The Republic came to an end in the following year, when Caracas was reoccupied by the Royalists on 16 July 1814, after a series of defeats at the hands of José Tomás Boves.

== Antecedents: Cartagena Manifesto ==
After the fall of the first Venezuelan Republic, colonel Simon Bolivar went into exile and headed for Curaçao. Soon after, he set sail for the United Provinces of New Granada, which had just recently declared its independence from the Spanish Empire.

In Cartagena, Bolivar penned a letter, the Cartagena Manifesto, in which he described the reasons that led to the fall of the First Republic, the current situation of Hispanic America, and his perspective on the future of the region.

Bolivar asked the New Granadian congress for his incorporation into the army, and was quickly promoted to the rank of Brigadier and assigned to a garrison. He then organized a flash campaign between Tunja and Pamplona, managing the expulsion of the royalist troops from this region. With the royalists in retreat, Bolivar once again addressed the New Granadian congress for authorization to intervene in Venezuela with an army of volunteers. In view of the actions Bolivar had executed in favor of the New Granadians, the congress granted his request and Bolivar marched into Venezuela.

== Use of the term in Venezuelan history ==
It is during this period that the term "Republic of Venezuela" was officially used by Simón Bolívar's government. During the First Republic, upon which Bolívar based the legitimacy of his actions, the government referred to the Venezuelan state as either the "American Confederation of Venezuela" or the "United Provinces of Venezuela" in the Declaration of Independence (both terms are used interchangeably), or as the "United States of Venezuela" (a term used interchangeably with "the Confederation") in the Constitution of 1811.

== Third Republic of Venezuela ==
Historians use the name Third Republic of Venezuela to refer to the period from about 1817 to 1819, when a rump government organized by Bolívar began functioning in the Venezuelan Llanos. The year before, various Venezuelan guerrilla forces managed to permanently establish themselves in the Llanos and captured the city of Angostura, which became their headquarters. This period culminated with the formation of the Congress of Angostura in 1819, which wrote a new constitution for Venezuela, replacing the one from 1811, which in theory, was still valid, although suspended since the collapse of the First Republic in 1812. The congress decreed the union of Venezuela with New Granada in a new republic, known as Gran Colombia, bringing an end to the Third Republic.

From 1820 to 1830, the territory of Venezuela was the Department of Venezuela within Gran Colombia. After the dissolution of Gran Colombia, Venezuela became once again the Republic of Venezuela, and, although undergoing various changes in constitutions and forms of government, it permanently maintained its independence from that moment on. This period is seen as a stable Fourth Republic of Venezuela.

== Administrative divisions ==
1. Mérida Province
2. Trujillo Province
3. Caracas Province
4. Barinas Province
5. Barcelona Province
6. Cumaná Province
7. Margarita Province

== See also ==
- Captaincy General of Venezuela
- Venezuelan War of Independence
- First Republic of Venezuela
- Third Republic of Venezuela
- Gran Colombia
- Venezuela
