= Venezuela Department (1819) =

Department In Gran Columbia

Venezuela Department was one of the three departments of Gran Colombia established in 1819.

In the West it bordered Cundinamarca Department (1820).

In 1824 the subdivisions of Gran Colombia changed, and the territory was split into 4 departments:

- Apure Department: 2 provinces - Barinas Province and Achaguas Province.
- Orinoco Department: 4 provinces - Cumaná Province, Barcelona Province, Guayana Province, Margarita Province.
- Venezuela Department: 2 provinces - Caracas Province, Carabobo Province.
- Zulia Department: 4 provinces - Maracaibo Province, Coro Province, Mérida Province, Trujillo Province.
