= Independence Day (Venezuela) =

National holiday in Venezuela

Independence Day (Spanish: Día de la Independencia), also known as the Fifth of July (Cinco de Julio) is the national independence holiday of Venezuela, marked every year on July 5 which celebrates the anniversary since the enactment of the 1811 Venezuelan Declaration of Independence, making the country the first Spanish colony in South America to declare independence. In recent years, it is also marked as National Armed Forces Day (Día de la Fuerza Armada Nacional) to honor the faithful service of all the serving men and women and veterans of the National Bolivarian Armed Forces of Venezuela.

The Caracas Independence Day parade, or Joint Civil-Military Parade of the 5th of July (Spanish: Desfile civico-militar conjunto del 5 de julio) is one of the largest in the Americas.

The other independence holiday is on 19 April, honoring the declaration of a local junta in Caracas on 19 April 1810, launching the road towards the First Republic of Venezuela and the start of the independence struggle.

== History ==
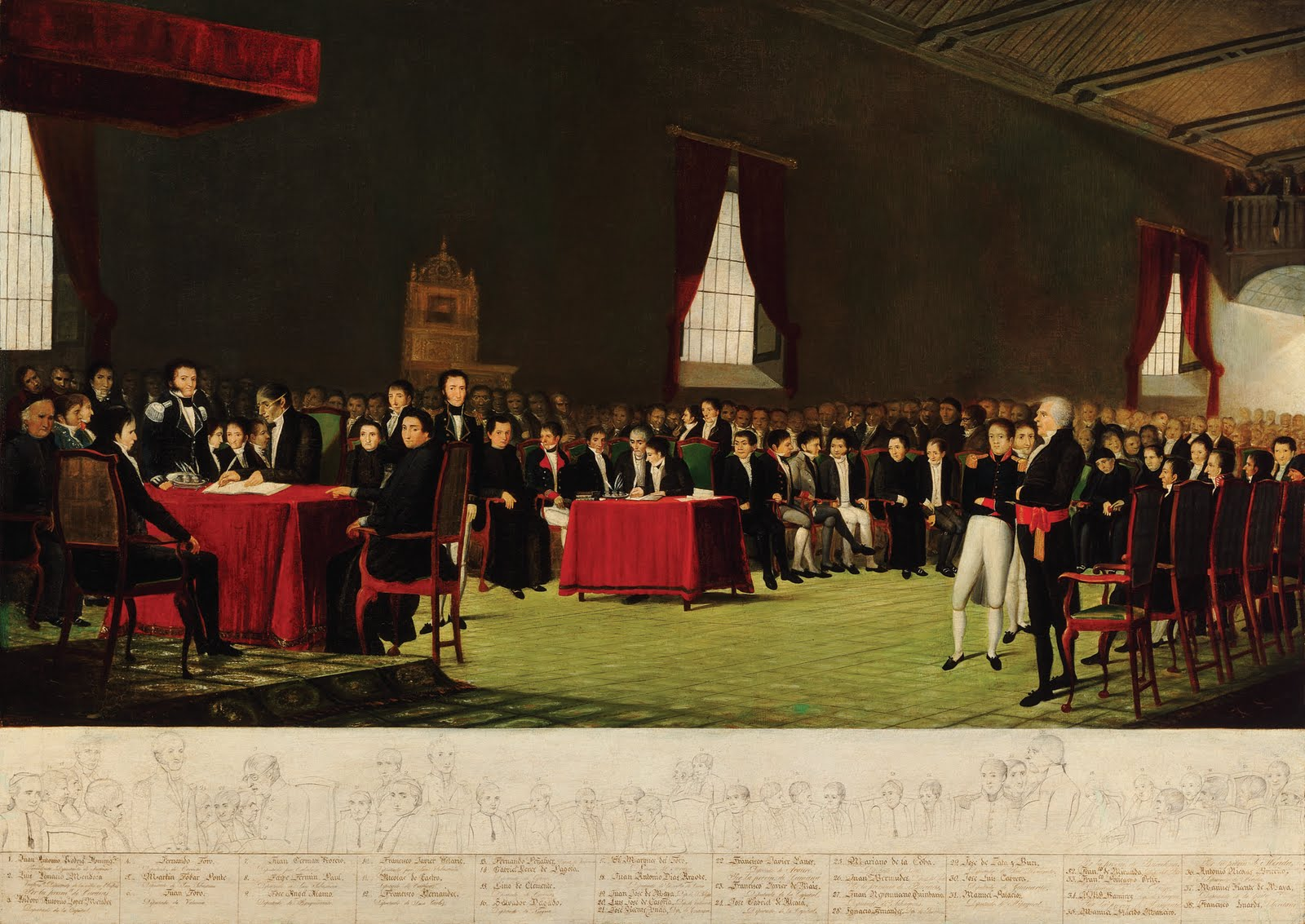
The National Constituent Congress on July 5, 1811.

The holiday marks the anniversary since the events of July 5, 1811 when delegates from the first National Constituent Congress which convened earlier on March 2 composed of many patriotic individuals from majority of the provinces of the Captaincy General of Venezuela which were elected by the populace of 7 of the 10 provinces (the remainder, Maracaibo Province, Coro Province and Guayana Province, remained loyal to Spanish rule and did not hold elections for their provincial representatives) officially resolved the issue of independence when it finished 2 days of discussions beginning on July 3 that year on that manner. The manner was put into vote in the Congressional session of July 5 and out of the 44 representatives, 40 voted for independence and 4 did not, a decision confirmed by the president of the Congress, Juan Antonio Rodríguez.

That same afternoon, representatives Cristóbal Mendoza and Juan Germán Roscio presented to Congress the declaration of national independence with the approval of the secretary general, Francisco Isnardi. In the document, representatives from seven of the ten provinces belonging to the Captaincy General (Caracas Province, Cumaná Province, Barinas Province, Margarita Province, Barcelona Province, Mérida Province and Trujillo Province) declared their independence and explained their reasons for this action, among them, that it was baneful that a small European nation ruled the great expanses of the Americas (the New World), that Spanish America recovered its right to self-government after the abdications of Charles IV and Ferdinand VII at Bayonne, and that the political instability in Spain dictated that Venezuelans rule themselves, despite the brotherhood they shared with Spain and the Spanish people at large. The declaration proclaimed a new nation called the American Confederacy of Venezuela, as an independent state under the republican form of government on the basis of the 7 provinces belonging to the former Captaincy General. The declaration was passed by Congress on July 7, with 43 votes for and one vote against, and was granted the full force of law in a decree published on July 8 by the president of the Executive Triumviate, Cristóbal Mendoza. It was later presented to the public in Caracas and read out in what is now the Plaza Bolivar on July 14, 1811.

=== Introduction of the parade ===
The Caracas Independence day parade was introduced in 1953 by then–Minister of Defense and President Major General Marcos Pérez Jiménez, as the finale of Fatherland Week (Semana de la Patria), which marked Independence Day and included a whole week of public parades, military drills, and patriotic and sporting events that celebrated the anniversary of national independence, as well as expressing national pride. The parade was also aimed at revitalizing the old practice of military parades that were held in the capital on Independence Day in years past (since 1886 parades had been held every June 24 in the Carabobo Field in Valencia, Carabobo, to celebrate Army Day and the anniversary of the patriotic victory in the Battle of Carabobo in 1821), while also becoming a showcase for the armed forces to extoll its martial virtues and the great strides made in modernization of the military and the nation at large. The modern parade is thus one of his more positive legacies to the cultural and military traditions of the republic.

Through the decades the parade evolved into the nation's primary military celebration of the anniversary of national independence, while at the same time honoring the service of the men and women of what is now the National Bolivarian Armed Forces and their efforts in strengthening national defense, maintaining territorial integrity, contributing to overall economic and social development, and in paving the way towards national prosperity, as well as in providing the nation a preview of the ability of the various branches of the armed forces to defend the country against aggression and in providing support to civil authorities in times of peace (such as natural disasters).

== Holiday customs ==
The day is spent with family bonding with friends and relatives and in either outdoor and indoor activities. All government offices and schools are closed as are some private enterprises save for commercial establishments. In the morning, the National Assembly holds a televised special session to honor the holiday wherein the declaration is publicly read, in remembrance of the work of the deputies of the Constituent Congress of 1811 who made the declaration possible.

Holiday celebrations and parades are also held in many state capital cities with the state governor as the principal guest.

== Caracas parade ==
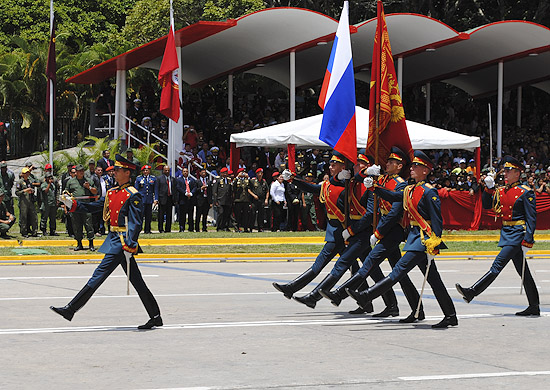
A Russian honor guard during the Independence Day parade in 2011

The highlight of Independence Day celebrations is the annual national Caracas Independence Day parade along the iconic Heroes Avenue in Fort Tiuna district, Caracas, where the general headquarters of the National Bolivarian Armed Forces, the Ministry of Defense and the Military University are located. The parade's guest of honor is the President in his constitutional duty as Commander in Chief of the National Bolivarian Armed Forces of Venezuela, and many state officials attend the event which is broadcast live on the state channel Venezolana de Televisión and simulcast on all private and public television stations (with VTV serving as the producer). The National Bolivarian Armed Forces and the Venezuelan National Police take part in the national parade together with civil contingents from the government, public sector firms and middle and high school marching bands.

=== Parade phases ===
==== Arrival ====
Preliminaries begin in the afternoon or midday when the president and the first lady, with military aides-de-camp from the Presidential Honour Guard Brigade, arrive at the Fort Tiuna campus of the Bolivarian Military University of Venezuela to receive the salute of an 11,000 to 21,500–strong military, police, and fire contingent, together with an 11,000-strong civil column of marchers representing the government, the Great Patriotic Pole, state companies, cooperatives, social organisations, and the country's indigenous peoples, all assembled at the Ceremonial Grounds of the Military University, which hosts the Army and National Guard academies. At the Generalissimo Francisco de Miranda Air Base the Venezuelan Air Force—together with the Venezuelan Army Aviation Command, Venezuelan Naval Aviation Command, and the National Guard Air Operations Command—prepares for the flypast segment of around 90 aircraft with an estimated combined total of 1,400 aircrew.

The parade commander—a general officer of the armed forces with the rank of major general or rear admiral, upper half—and his staff of around 5 officers, drawn from all the service branches of the National Armed Forces (Army, Navy, Air Force, National Guard, and National Militia), together with the Parade Chief of Staff and his or her adjutants, then orders the parade to render a salute to the president in his constitutional role as Commander in Chief of the National Armed Forces. As the salute is rendered, the colours are dipped while the Massed Corps of Drums of the Military University sound the Marcha Regular. As the music ends, at a signal by the senior drum major, the parade is then commanded to slope arms as the president departs and proceeds to an open-top vehicle to proceed to the presidential grandstand on National Heroes Avenue, the broad street where the parade will be held. As the president departs, the parade prepares to march off the grounds.

As the massed central military bands of the armed forces and their academies, formed into the 170-strong National Armed Forces Composite Ceremonial Band, play the Hymn to Bolivar, the current presidential march, on cue, the presidential motorcade drives along the wide avenue, escorted by agents of the Presidential Honour Guard Brigade and the Bolivarian Intelligence Service, together with the PHGB's Presidential Mounted Escort Troop, who wear uniforms inspired by those worn by Simon Bolivar's Hussar Troop during the early stages of the Latin American wars of independence. As the thousands of assembled Venezuelans and tourists gathered in the viewing stands watch, the president reviews the active and reserve servicemen and women of the Armed Forces, officers of the National Police, veterans of the armed forces, government employees and workers of state firms and enterprises. The motorcade then circles the National Heroes Monument, and the south end of National Heroes Park, and halts at the presidential grandstand so that the president can disembark from his vehicle to be welcomed by the following officials:

- Chief of the Presidential General Staff
- Minister of Defence
- Minister of the Interior, Justice, and Peace
- Commander of the Armed Forces Strategic Operational Command
- Chairman of the Armed Forces Joint Chiefs of Staff
- Vice Chairman of the Joint Chiefs
- Commanding Generals of the Army, Navy, Air Force, National Guard, and National Militia
- Bishop of the Military Ordinariate
- Commanding Officer, Presidential Honour Guard Brigade

The president then proceeds to the grandstand to greet members of the cabinet, the president and vice presidents of the National Assembly, the justices and chief justice of the Supreme Tribunal of Justice, the Commissioner General of the National Police, other state officials, and members of the diplomatic corps, including foreign military attaches.

In front of the president is an assembled 900-strong composite guard-of-honour battalion made up of cadets of the military academies, the Caracas Honour Guard Battalion, and the Presidential Honour Guard Brigade, formed into companies to render the arrival honours, the guard of honour unit commander being a field officer of the armed forces with the army rank of major or lieutenant colonel or navy rank of lieutenant commander or commander.

Following a reading of quotes from Simon Bolivar, Ezequel Zamora, and Hugo Chávez, the arrival honours are rendered to the president by order of the guard of honour commander, who orders the parade to present arms. As the salute is rendered, the composite band plays the national anthem Gloria al Bravo Pueblo.

The arrival honours rendered, and the guard of honour executing slope arms and order arms, the Bishop of the Military Ordinariate then says a prayer, at the conclusion of which the guard of honour executes slope arms, a right turn, and marches away from the presidential grandstand, to make way for the arrival of the parade commander and his staff. A moment of silence then follows, to honour all armed forces personnel killed in active duty.

==== Opening report of the parade commander ====
The parade commander and his staff, aboard an armored vehicle of either the army or the marine corps, then proceed to the presidential grandstand where the opening report is delivered. After the vehicles stop in front of the presidential grandstand and the military personnel dismount, the parade commander requests the president's permission to order the parade to commence, which is followed by the president's opening remarks and his giving his approval for the parade to start. The approval granted and the military personnel ordered to embark on the vehicles, the vehicles return to their starting position at the west end of National Heroes Avenue, following the national colour guard unit provided by the Caracas Honor Guard Battalion of the Ministry of Defence.

==== Parade proper ====
Following a trumpet call by the massed bands' trumpeters, the parade begins, as the national colour guard squad marches in the avenue to music by the bands, carrying the Flag of Venezuela and the Colour of the Ministry of Defence, as 3 air force helicopters carrying the national colours and the colours of the branches of the armed forces fly past. The colour guard of the Caracas Battalion, upon approaching the presidential grandstand, marches past in quick time as the ministry colour is dipped. Following are the scarlet Honorary Colours of the Supreme Commander and of the Liberator of the Nation, and the replica of the Sword of Peru received by Bolivar in 1825, all carried by men mounted on horses (the former two colours also can be carried on tanks), followed by a motorised or dismounted colour guard of the service branches' colours, and then by the parade commander's vehicle and that of his staff, leading the more than 22,000-strong parade ground column. A joint service colour guard follows.

Recent parades have included a civil column preceding the main military portion of the parade, involving thousands of marchers representing government ministries, state firms, the Great Patriotic Pole, people's farming and industrial cooperatives, state economic enterprises, and athletes, in addition to cultural contingents showcasing the diverse cultures of Venezuela and her indigenous communities, and high school marching bands. Numbering around 12,000 civilians from all walks of life, the marchers walk past the president and guests in the grandstand. Float displays also feature prominently in the civil parade, where floats are designed to promote government and party campaigns, or highlight the works of various public companies, farm cooperatives, ministries, and state economic firms.

==== Military and police parade segment ====
Following the civil parade is the much awaited military parade segment. Given the impact of the strong government backing of the armed forces, the military parade has always featured military units from branches of the armed forces, the militia and the National Police, made up of servicemen and women of these organizations. All of these march past to music of the bands. First to march past is the historical contingent made up of personnel of the armed forces in historical uniforms commemorating the country's military history.

These are followed by the march past in slow time of the Corps of Cadets of the Military University as the bands play El Indio y El Conquistador, with the senior classes first carrying sabres and the junior classes carrying rifles.

After the march of the cadets, the parade proper continues with the march of battalions of personnel on foot from the Armed Forces, National Militia and National Police.

The double past of special forces units, introduced in the 1960s in imitation of the march past of the Italian army Bersaglieri, is a demonstration of the combat capabilities and readiness of the serving men and women of the special forces and engineering units of the National Armed Forces, Militia and the National Police in the defence of the country and protecting public security. Their march begins as the massed bands play the Carabobo Reveille, and the music stops as the troops, in double-time, march past at their jogging pace while in trail-arms position and eyes right or left past the grandstand, as well as family members of the servicemen watching their sons and daughters march on the double.

The mobile column is one of the parade's more anticipated segments, wherein the National Armed Forces and National Police present their latest equipment and vehicles to the general public and the country at large. It has been also one of the biggest segments, with over 1,100 vehicles and 9,000 service personnel, and is one of the more awaited. Simultaneous with that is the flypast of combat, combat support, and transport aircraft of the service branches of the armed forces.

=== Full order of the military parade contingents ===
- Colour guard of Caracas Battalion
- Colour guard of service branches
- Colour guard of service units and commands
- Caracas Battalion
- Historical contingent
  - Presidential Honour Guard Brigade
  - Women's company wearing uniforms inspired by the life of Manuela Saenz
  - Militiamen
  - Company of international fighters during the Latin American wars of independence
  - Women's company of soldiers during the Latin American wars of independence in Venezuela
  - Battle of Carabobo contingent (2021 parade)
    - Infantry
    - Dismounted cavalry
  - Navy
  - Air Force
  - National Guard
