= Viceroyalty of New Granada =

Viceroyalty of the Spanish Empire (1717–1822)

Coordinates: 4°39′N 74°03′W

Viceroyalty of New Granada Virreinato de la Nueva Granada
- 1717–1723; 1739–1810; 1816–1822
- Flag Coat of arms
- Motto: Utraque Unum "Out of two (worlds) one"
- Anthem: Marcha Real "Royal March" (1775–1810, 1816–1822)
- Viceroyalty of New Granada at its largest extent, 1739–1777
- Status: Viceroyalty of the Spanish Empire
- Capital: Santa Fe de Bogotá
- Common languages: Spanish (official, administrative); Indigenous languages (Arawakan languages, Barbacoan languages, Chibchan languages, Guajiboan languages, Páez, Ticuna)
- Religion: Roman Catholicism
- Government: Monarchy
- Kings
  - 1717–1724 (first): Philip V
  - 1813–1822 (last): Ferdinand VII
- Viceroy
  - 1718–1719 (first): Antonio Ignacio de la Pedrosa y Guerrero
  - 1819–1822 (last): Juan de la Cruz Mourgeón
- Historical era: Spanish colonization of the Americas
  - Established: 27 May 1717–1723; 1739–1810; 1816
  - Suppressed: 5 November 1723
  - Reestablished: 20 August 1739
  - Separation of Venezuela: 8 September 1777
  - Independence declared: 20 July 1810
  - Reconquest: 3 September 1816
  - Battle of Pichincha: 24 May 1822

Area
- 1778: 2,300,000 km^{2} (890,000 sq mi)

Population
  - 1778: 1,280,000
  - 1810: 2,150,000
- Currency: Spanish real
Preceded by
New Spain
New Kingdom of Granada
Venezuela Province
Viceroyalty of Peru
Succeeded by
Venezuela Province
Captaincy General of Venezuela
Trinidad and Tobago
Free and Independent State of Cundinamarca
United Provinces of New Granada
Gran Colombia

The Viceroyalty of the New Kingdom of Granada (Spanish: Virreinato del Nuevo Reino de Granada [birejˈnato ðel ˈnweβo ˈrejno ðe ɣɾaˈnaða]), also called Viceroyalty of New Granada (Virreinato de la Nueva Granada) or Viceroyalty of Santa Fe, was the name given on 27 May 1717 to the jurisdiction of the Spanish Empire in northern South America, corresponding to modern Colombia, Ecuador, Panama and Venezuela.

Created in 1717 by King Felipe V, as part of a new territorial control policy, it was suspended in 1723 for financial problems. It was restored in 1739 until the independence movement suspended it again in 1810. The territory corresponding to Panama was incorporated in 1739. The provinces of Venezuela were separated from the Viceroyalty and assigned to the Captaincy General of Venezuela in 1777.

In addition to those core areas, the territory of the Viceroyalty of New Granada included Guyana, Trinidad and Tobago, southwestern Suriname, parts of northwestern Brazil, and northern Peru. A strip along the Atlantic Ocean in Mosquito Coast was added by the Royal Decree of 20 November 1803, but the British battled for administrative control.

== Colonial history ==
The Spanish and Portuguese empires, 1790.

Two centuries after the establishment of the New Kingdom of Granada in the 16th century, whose governor was dependent upon the Viceroy of Peru at Lima, and an audiencia at Santa Fe de Bogotá, today capital of the republic of Colombia, in 1717 the slowness of communications between the two capitals led to the creation of an independent Viceroyalty of New Granada. It was reestablished in 1739 after a short interruption.

Other provinces corresponding to modern Ecuador, the eastern and southern parts of today's Venezuela, and Panama came together in a political unit under the jurisdiction of Bogotá, confirming that city as one of the principal administrative centers of the Spanish possessions in the New World, along with Lima and Mexico City. Sporadic attempts at reform were directed at increasing efficiency and centralizing authority, but control from Spain was never very effective.

The rough and diverse geography of northern South America and the limited range of proper roads made travel and communications within the viceroyalty difficult. The establishment of an autonomous Captaincy General in Caracas in 1777 and the preservation of the older Audiencia of Quito, nominally subject to the Viceroy but for most purposes independent, was a response to the necessities of effectively governing the peripheral regions. Some analysts also consider that these measures reflected a degree of local traditions that eventually contributed to the differing political and national differences among these territories once they became independent in the nineteenth century and which the unifying efforts of Simón Bolívar could not overcome.

=== Guajira rebellion ===
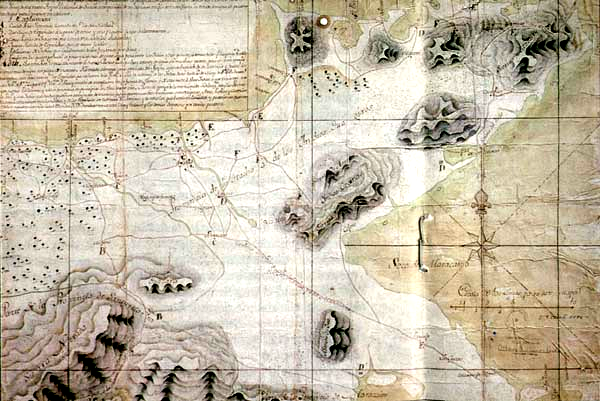
Map of La Guajira in 1769

The Spanish had never subjugated the Wayuu, but the two groups were more or less in a permanent state of war. There had been rebellions in 1701 (when they destroyed a Capuchin mission), 1727 (when more than 2,000 Wayuus attacked the Spanish), 1741, 1757, 1761 and 1768. In 1718, Governor Soto de Herrera called them "barbarians, horse thieves, worthy of death, without God, without law, and without a king." Of all the Indians in the territory of Colombia, the Wayuu were unique in having learned the use of firearms and horses.

In 1769 the Spanish took 22 Wayuus captive, in order to put them to work building the fortifications of Cartagena. The reaction of the Wayuus was unexpected. On 2 May 1769, at El Rincón, near Riohacha, they set their village afire, burning the church and two Spaniards who had taken refuge in it. They also captured the priest. The Spanish immediately dispatched an expedition from El Rincón to capture the Wayuus. At the head of this force was José Antonio de Sierra, a mestizo who had also headed the party that had taken the 22 Guajiro captives. The Guajiros recognized him and forced his party to take refuge in the house of the curate, which they then set afire. Sierra and eight of his men were killed.

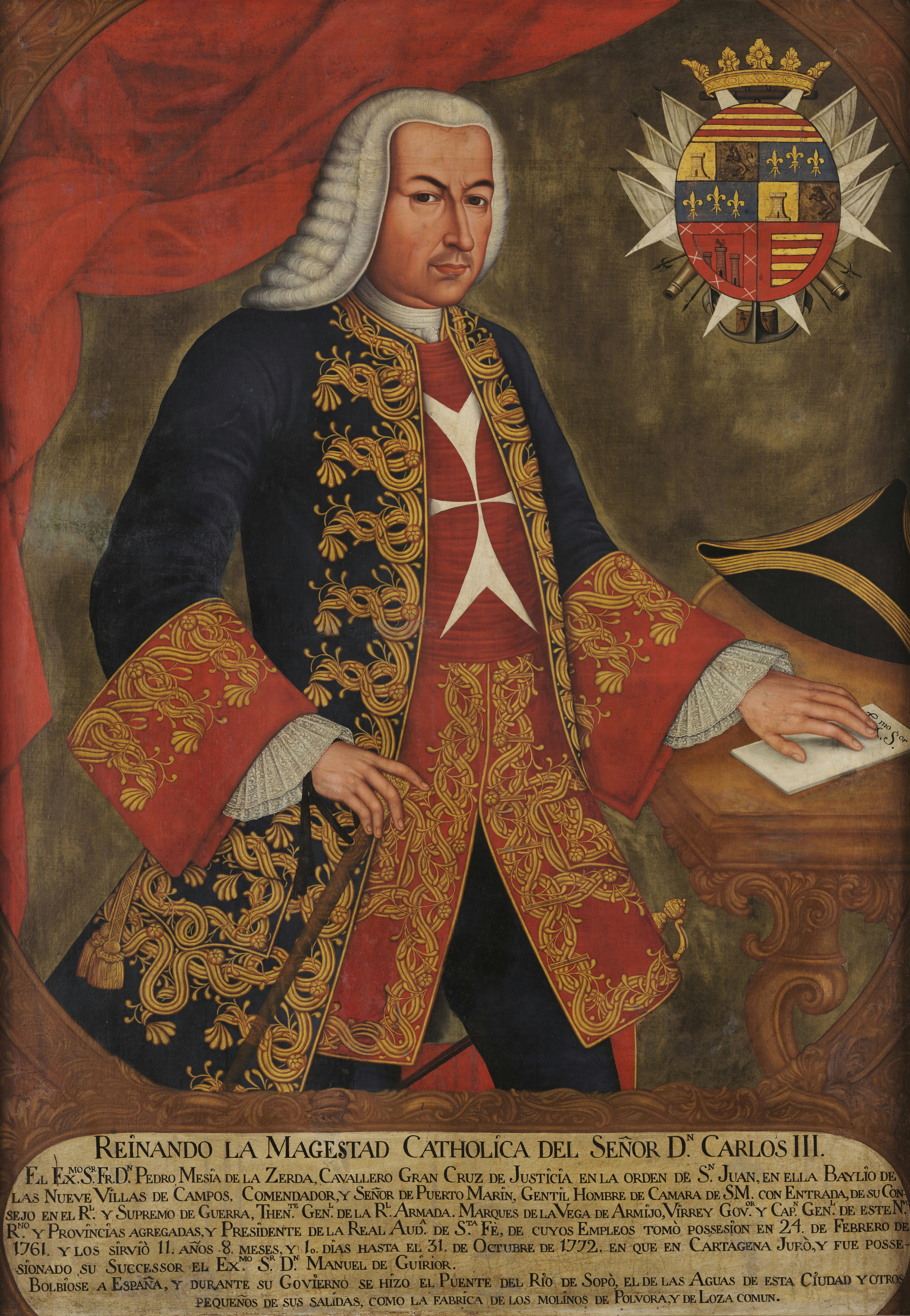
Pedro Messía de la Cerda, Viceroy of New Granada

This success was soon known in other Guajiro areas, and more men joined the revolt. According to Messía, at the peak, there were 20,000 Wayuus under arms. Many had firearms acquired from English and Dutch smugglers, sometimes even from the Spanish. This enabled the rebels to take nearly all the settlements of the region, which they burned. According to the authorities, more than 100 Spaniards were killed and many others were taken prisoner. Many cattle were also taken by the rebels.

The Spaniards took refuge in Riohacha and sent urgent messages to Maracaibo, Valledupar, Santa Marta and Cartagena, the latter responding by sending 100 troops. The rebels themselves were not unified. Sierra's relatives among the Indians took up arms against the rebels to avenge his death. A battle between the two groups of Wayuus was fought at La Soledad. That and the arrival of the Spanish reinforcements caused the rebellion to fade away, but not before the Guajiro had regained much territory.

== Independent history ==
The retribution stoked renewed rebellion, which, combined with a weakened Spain, made possible a successful independence struggle led mainly by Simón Bolívar and Francisco de Paula Santander in neighboring Venezuela. Bolívar returned to New Granada only in 1819 after establishing himself as leader of the pro-independence forces in the Venezuelan llanos. From there Bolivar led an army over the Andes and captured New Granada after a quick campaign that ended at the Battle of Boyacá, on 7 August 1819, finally proclaimed independence in 1821. The pro-Spanish resistance was defeated in 1822 in the present territory of Colombia and in 1823 in Venezuela.

The territories of the viceroyalty gained full de facto independence from Spain between 1819 and 1822 after a series of military and political struggles, uniting in a republic now known as Gran Colombia.

With the dissolution of Gran Colombia, the states of Ecuador, Venezuela, and the Republic of New Granada were created. The Republic of New Granada, with its capital at Bogotá, lasted from 1831 to 1858, when the constitution of 22 May 1858 replaced it with the Granadine Confederation. The name "Colombia" reappeared in the "United States of Colombia"; the new name for the country having been introduced by a liberal government after a civil war. The use of the term "New Granada" survived in conservative circles, such as among ecclesiastics.

== Administrative divisions ==
=== New Kingdom of Granada (Real Audiencia of Santa Fe de Bogotá) ===
The Real Audiencia of Santa Fe de Bogotá was established in 1549, but became part of the Viceroyalty of New Granada in 1717. It was re-incorporated into the Viceroyalty of Peru from 1723 to 1739. It met in the city of Santa Fe de Bogotá until it was disestablished in 1810. It was briefly re-established between 1816 and 1819. It had the following provinces under its authority:

- Province of Santa Fe (1717 to 1723, 1739 to 1810 and 1816 to 1819) (seat of the Real Audiencia)
- Province of Antioquia (1717 to 1723, 1739 to 1810 and 1816 to 1819)
- Province of Cartagena de Indias (1717 to 1723, 1739 to 1810 and 1816 to 1819)
- Province of Casanare (1717 to 1723, 1739 to 1810 and 1816 to 1819)
- Province of Mariquita (1717 to 1723, 1739 to 1810 and 1816 to 1819)
- Province of Neiva (1717 to 1723, 1739 to 1810 and 1816 to 1819)
- Province of New Pamplona (1717 to 1723, 1739 to 1810 and 1816 to 1819)
- Province of Santa Marta (1717 to 1723 and 1739 to 1821)
- Province of Tunja (1717 to 1723, 1739 to 1810 and 1816 to 1819)
- Province of Chocó (1726 to 1810 and 1816 to 1819)
- Province of Trinidad (1739 to 1777)
- Province of Darién (1751 to 1821)
- Province of Panama (1751 to 1821)
- Province of Portobelo (1751 to 1821)
- Province of Veraguas (1751 to 1821)
- Province of Socorro (from 1795 to 1810 and from 1816 to 1819)

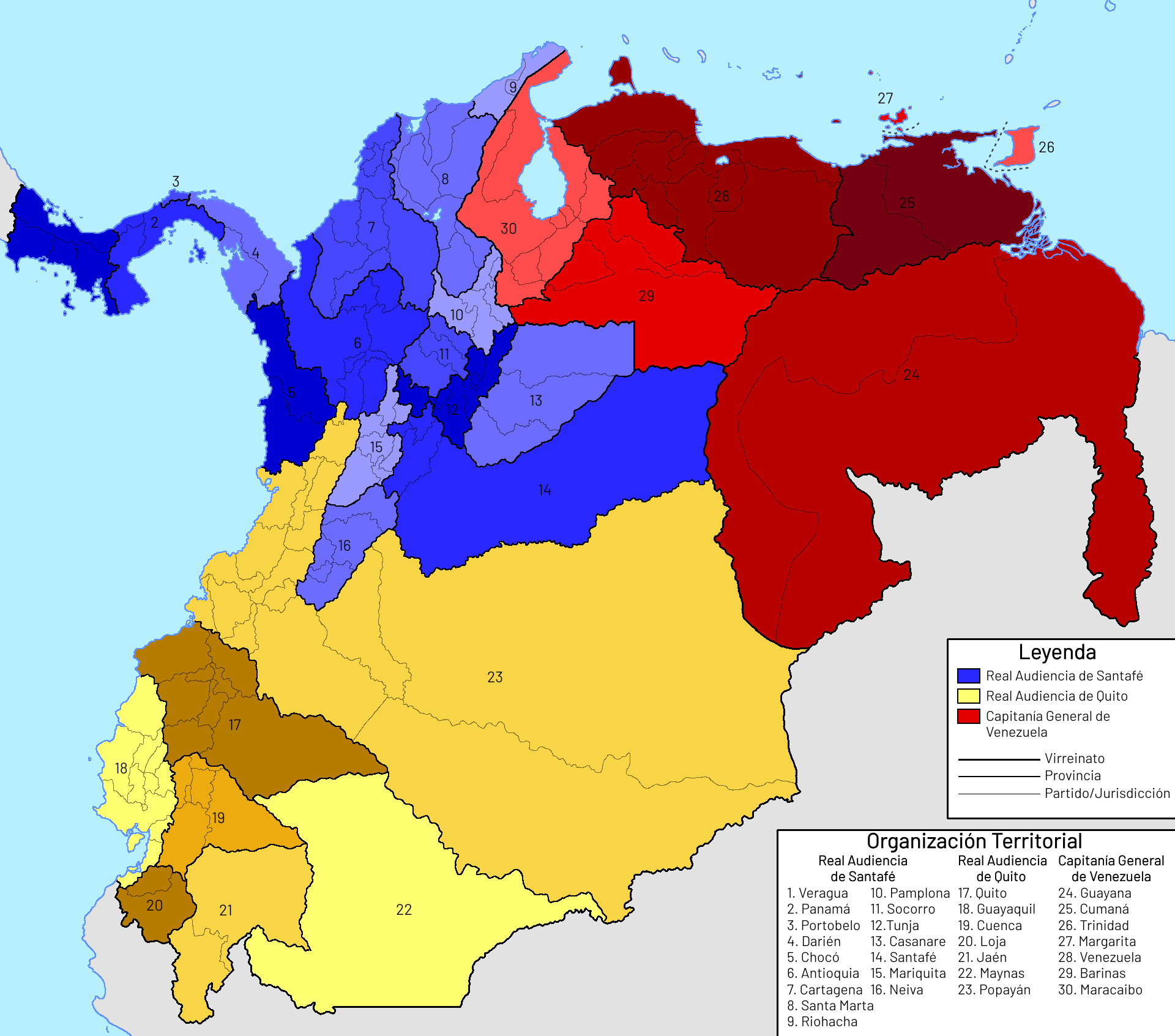
Political division of the Viceroyalty of New Granada, in red the Kingdom and Captaincy General of Venezuela, in blue the New Kingdom of Granada and in yellow the Kingdom of Quito.

=== Kingdom of Quito (Real Audiencia of Quito) ===
- Province of Quito (1717 to 1723 and 1739 to 1822)
- Province of Jaén de Bracamoros (1717 to 1723 and 1739 to 1821)
- Province of Macas (1717 to 1723 and 1739 to 1821)
- Province of Maynas (1717 to 1723 and 1739 to 1802)
- Province of Popayán (1717 to 1723 and 1739 to 1821)
- Province of Quijos (1717 to 1723 and 1739 to 1802)
- Province of Cuenca (1763 to 1822)
- Province of Guayaquil (1763 to 1803)

=== Kingdom of Tierra Firme (Real Audiencia of Panama) ===
- Province of Panama (1739 to 1751)
- Province of Darién (1739 to 1751)
- Province of Portobelo (1739 to 1751)
- Province of Veraguas (1739 to 1751)

=== Kingdom and Captaincy General of Venezuela (Real Audiencia of Caracas) ===
- Province of Caracas (1786 to 1810)
- Province of Barinas (1786 to 1810)
- Province of Guayana (1786 to 1810)
- Province of New Andalusia (1786 to 1810)
- Province of Maracaibo (1786 to 1810)
- Province of Margarita (1786 to 1810)
- Province of Trinidad (1786 to 1802)

== Demographics ==
In the 1778 census, New Granada had a population of around 1,280,000. Around 40% of the population were Indians, with around 500,000 people. The next largest group were free Mestizos and Africans, at around 400,000. Whites had close to 300,000. The smallest group, at around 70,000 people, were slaves. In the current territory of Colombia, it was estimated that the population was 826,550. In 1810, New Granada was estimated to have 2,150,000 inhabitants.

== See also ==
- History of the Americas
- History of Colombia
- History of Ecuador
- History of Venezuela
- List of Viceroys of New Granada
- Spanish Empire
- Criollo people
