= Boyacá Department (Gran Colombia) =

Department of defunct state Gran Colombia, Colombia

Boyaca Department Departamento del Boyaca
- Department
- Coordinates: 5°32′N 7°22′W
- Country: Colombia
- State: Gran Colombia
- Established: 1824
- Dissolved: 1830
- Capital: Tunja

Population (1820)
  - Total: 444,000

Boyacá Department was one of the departments of Gran Colombia.

== Borders ==
It had borders to

- Magdalena Department, Zulia Department, Apure Department in the North,
- Orinoco Department in the East,
- Azuay Department in the South,
- Cauca Department, Cundinamarca Department in the West.

== Subdivisions ==
4 provinces and 29 cantons:

- Tunja Province. Capital: Tunja. Cantones: Tunja, Chiquinquirá, Garagoa, Leyva, Moniquirá, Muzo, Santa Rosa, Sogamoso, Suata y Turmeque.
- Casanare Province. Capital: Pore. Cantones: Pore, Arauca, Chire, Macuco, Nunchía y Tame.
- Pamplona Province. Capital: Pamplona. Cantones: Pamplona, Bucaramanga, Girón, Piedecuesta, Salazar, San José de Cúcuta y Villa del Rosario.
- Socorro Province. Capital: Socorro. Cantones: Socorro, Barichara, Charalá, San Gil, Vélez y Zapatoca.
