= Provinces of Venezuela =

Administrative divisions, 1830–1864

The Provinces of Venezuela were administrative divisions used from Venezuela's independence from Gran Colombia in 1830 to 1864, when the States of Venezuela were created. There were initially 11 provinces, with 4 created later, until in 1856 the Law of Territorial Division divided Venezuela into 21 provinces.

Some of the provinces at independence had previously existed in a similar form during the Spanish Empire, in some cases having been abolished during the Gran Colombia period. With the conclusion of the Federal War in 1863, a new constitution transformed the provinces into the States of Venezuela.

== Before the declaration of independence ==
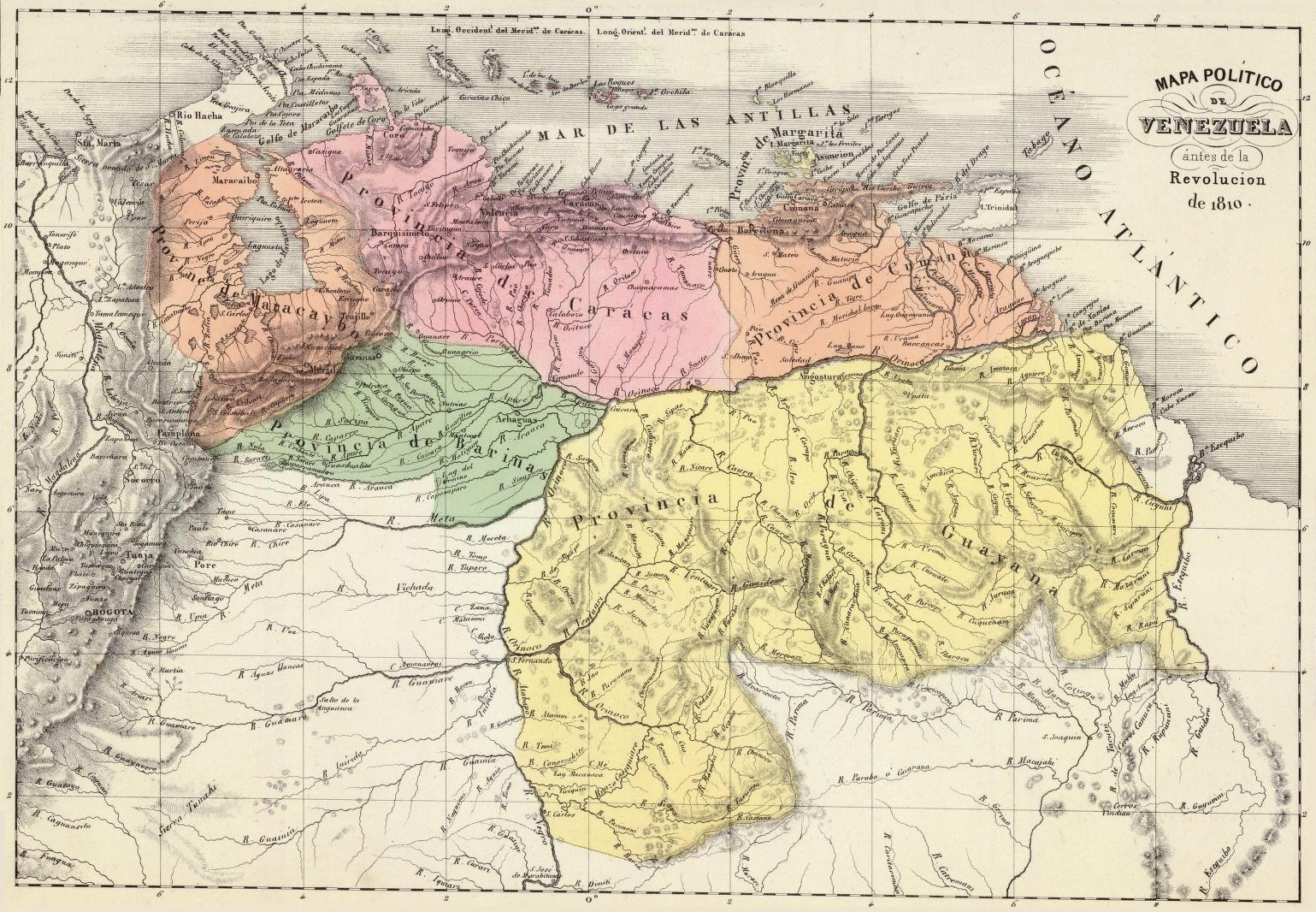
Map of Venezuela in 1810, by Agostino Codazzi.

As of 1810 Venezuela's provinces within the Captaincy General of Venezuela were

- Barinas Province (1786)
- Guayana Province (1585)
- Maracaibo Province (1676)
- Margarita Province (1525)
- New Andalusia Province (Also known as Cumaná Province, 1537)
- Venezuela Province (Also known as Caracas Province, created 1527)

The Venezuelan Declaration of Independence (1811) was signed by Caracas Province, Cumaná Province, Barinas Province, Margarita Province, plus the newly created Barcelona Province, Mérida Province and Trujillo Province. The three remaining provinces (Maracaibo Province, Guayana Province, and the newly created Coro Province) opted to stay under Spanish rule. Following the Venezuelan War of Independence, all were incorporated into Gran Colombia.

== At independence, 1830 ==
- Apure Province (created 1823, splitting from Barinas Province)
- Barcelona Province (1811, from New Andalusia Province)
- Barinas Province
- Carabobo Province (1824, split from Caracas Province)
- Caracas Province (during Spanish Empire also known as Venezuela Province)
- Coro Province (1811, split from Caracas Province)
- Cumaná Province (during Spanish Empire also known as New Andalusia Province)
- Guayana Province
- Maracaibo Province (1830; Maracaibo Province originally created 1676; see also Maracaibo Province (Gran Colombia))
- Margarita Province
- Mérida Province (1811; see also Mérida Province (1622 - 1676))

== Later ==
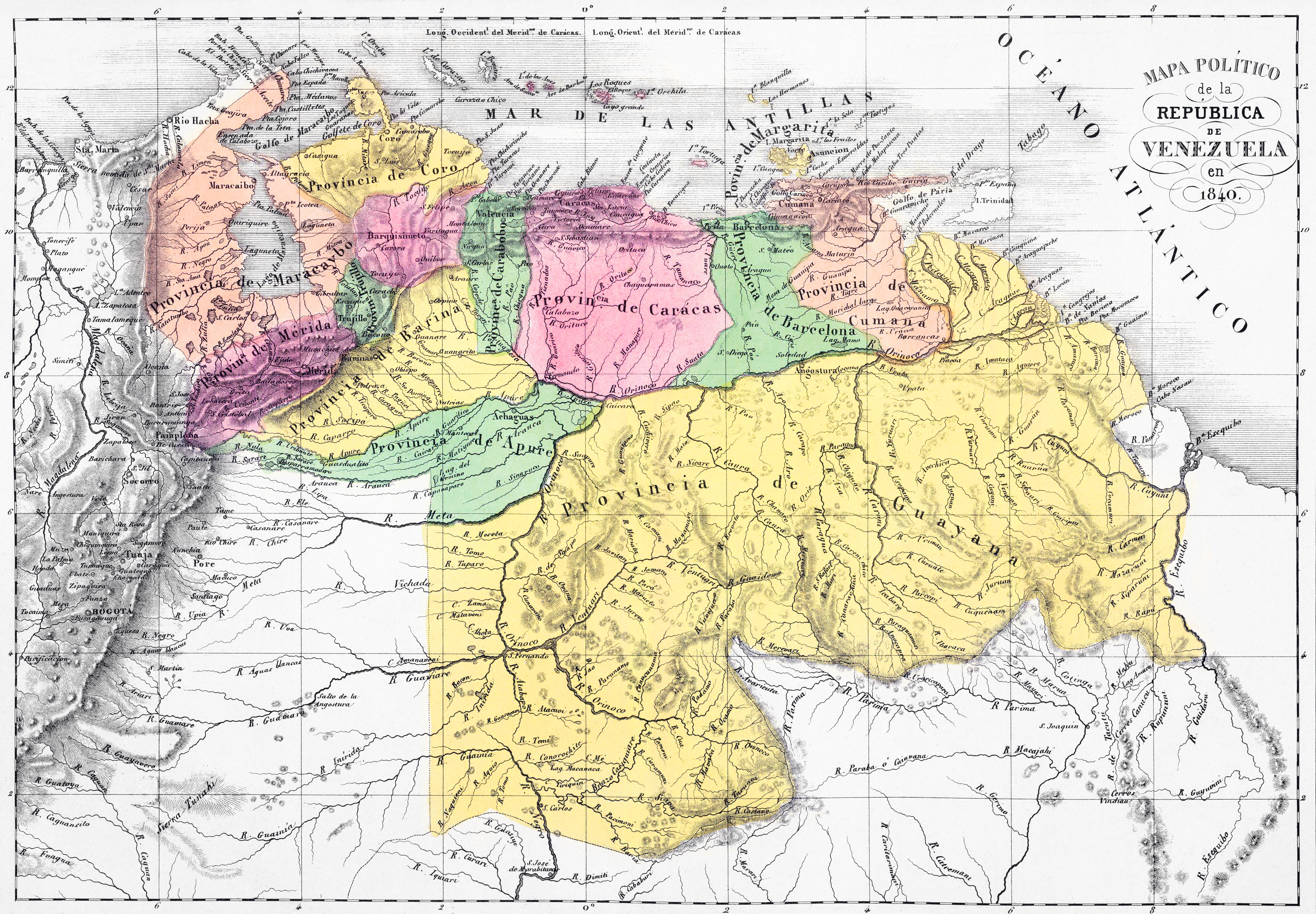
The 13 provinces of Venezuela existing in 1840. Map by Agostino Codazzi.

- Barquisimeto Province (1832, splitting from Carabobo Province)
- Trujillo Province (1831, splitting from Maracaibo Province)
- Aragua Province and Guárico Province (1848, splitting from Caracas Province)
- 1856 - Law of Territorial Division divides Venezuela into 21 provinces, with the new provinces being
  - Amazonas Province,
  - Cojedes Province,
  - Maturin Province,
  - Portuguesa Province,
  - Táchira Province
  - Yaracuy Province.
- 1860 - Amazonas Province merged into Guayana Province
- Zamora Province (1862, from a merger of Apure and Barinas provinces; the merger was reversed in 1864)
