= Venezuela Department =

Venezuela Department may refer to two different entities:

- Venezuela Department (1820)
- Venezuela Department (1824)
1820

1824
