= Luis Antonio Robles =

Colombian lawyer & politician (1849–1899)

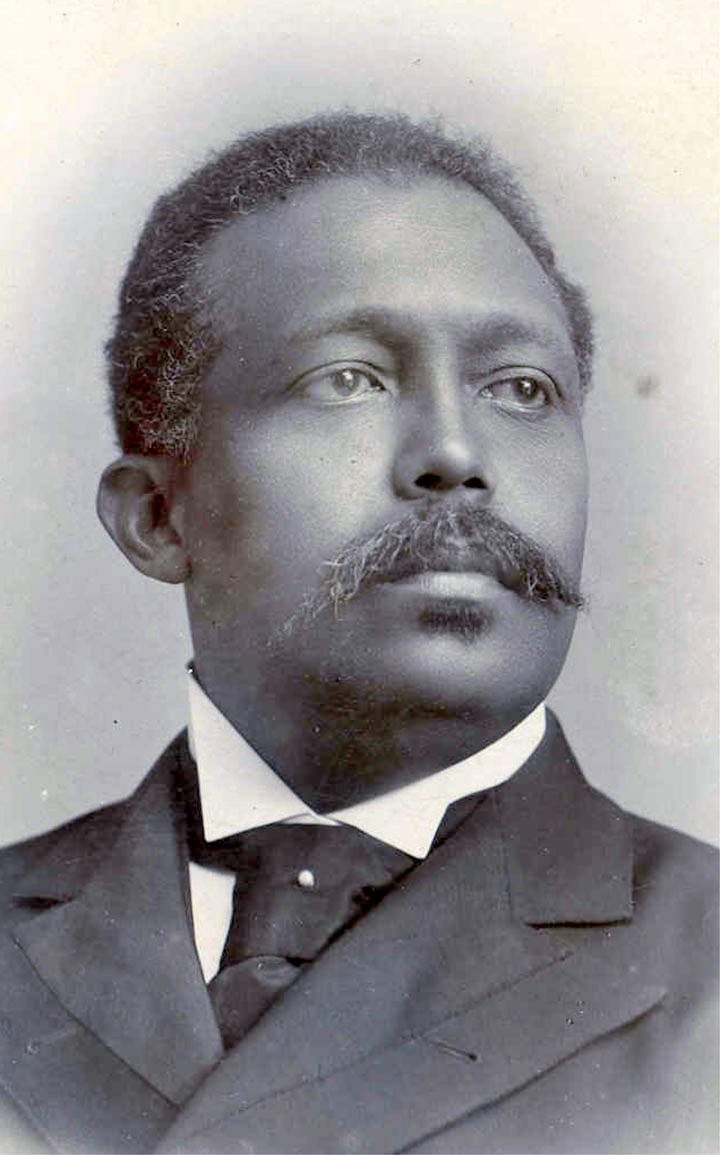
- Oil painting by Epifanio Julián Garay y Caicedo.

Member of the Chamber of Representatives of Colombia
- In office 1 April 1892 – 1 April 1896
- Constituency: Antioquia State
- In office 1 March 1876 – 1 April 1876
- Constituency: Magdalena State

16th President of the Sovereign State of Magdalena
- In office 1 April 1878 – 25 June 1879
- Preceded by: Manuel Davila García
- Succeeded by: José María Campo Serrano

Colombian Secretary of the Treasury and Public Credit
- In office 1 April 1876 – 1 April 1877
- President: Aquileo Parra Gómez
- Preceded by: José María Villamizar Gallardo
- Succeeded by: José María Quijano Wallis

Personal details
- Born: Luis Antonio Robles Suárez; 24 October 1849 Riohacha, Riohacha, Magdalena, New Granada
- Died: 22 September 1899 (aged 49) Bogotá, Cundinamarca, Colombia
- Party: Liberal
- Education: Our Lady of the Rosary University (JD)
- Profession: Lawyer

Luis Antonio Robles Suárez (24 October 1849 – 22 September 1899) also known as "El Negro Robles", was a Colombian lawyer and politician. He was the first Afro-Colombian to hold a cabinet-level ministry in Colombia serving as Secretary of the Treasury and Public Credit during the administration of President Aquileo Parra Gómez, as well as being the first Afro-Colombian Congressperson as Member of the Chamber of Representatives for Magdalena, and the first Afro-Colombian Governor of a Department, as the 16th President of the Sovereign State of Magdalena. He graduated a lawyer from Our Lady of the Rosary University in 1872, thus also becoming the first Afro-Colombian to ever serve as a lawyer in Colombia.

== Career ==
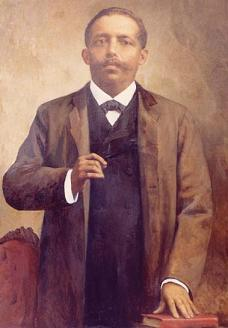
Oil on canvas painting of Luis Antonio Robles by Epifanio Julián Garay y Caicedo.

It is not my fault that I am Black: Night has imprinted her mantle over my epidermis. But the bones of my ancestors in the vaults of Cartagena still whiten, for giving freedom to many Whites of black consciences such as yours.

— Luis Antonio Robles,

I won't be silenced! I have the right to speak as a representative of the people. Yes, I belong the Black race, redeemed by the Republic, and my duty is to serve those who shattered its yoke.

— Luis Antonio Robles,

== Personal life ==
Born on 24 October 1849 in the hamlet of Camarones in the Municipality of Riohacha, then part of the Riohacha Province, in the Department of Magdalena, New Granada; his parents were Luis Antonio Robles and Manuela Súarez, both black freedpersons of moderate means.

He died on 22 September 1899 of cystitis infection in his longtime residence le Maison Doré in Bogotá at the age of 49, not having married and with no descendants still recovering from the death of his mother earlier that year. His childhood home in Camarones was designated a national monument, and his remains, which had been interred at the Central Cemetery of Bogotá, were transported to be interred at his childhood home which operates as a Cultural House, Library and Training Center.

== See also ==
- Paula Marcela Moreno Zapata
