= Trujillo Province =

Trujillo Province may refer to:

- Trujillo Province, Peru

In the area of present-day Venezuela:

- Trujillo Province (Gran Colombia), from 1824 to 1830
- Trujillo Province (Venezuela), from 1831, as a split from Maracaibo
