= Barcelona Province =

Barcelona Province may refer to:

- Barcelona Province, Spain
- Barcelona Province (Venezuela), 1520–1864
