= Venezuelan Declaration of Independence =

1811 joint resolution by colonial Venezuelan provinces declaring independence from Spain

Act of the Declaration of Independence of Venezuela
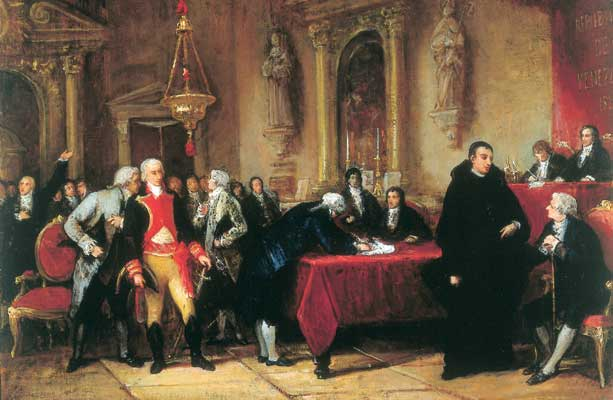
- 1876 study by Martín Tovar y Tovar depicting the signing of the declaration
- Created: July 5, 1811
- Ratified: July 20, 1811
- Location: Federal Legislative Palace (since 1908)
- Author(s): Juan Germán Roscio and Francisco Isnardi
- Signatories: 40 deputies of the First National Congress of Venezuela
- Purpose: To declare the absolute independence of Venezuela from the Spanish Crown

The Venezuelan Declaration of Independence (Spanish: Acta de la Declaración de Independencia de Venezuela) is a document drafted and adopted by Venezuela on July 5, 1811, through which Venezuelans made the decision to separate from the Spanish Crown in order to establish a new nation based on the premises of equality of individuals, abolition of censorship and dedication to freedom of expression. These principles were enshrined as a constitutional principle for the new nation and were radically opposed to the political, cultural, and social practices that had existed during three hundred years of colonization.

== Content ==
Seven of the ten provinces belonging to the Captaincy General of Venezuela declared their independence and explained their reasons for this action, among them, that it was baneful that a small European nation ruled the great expanses of the New World, that Spanish America recovered its right to self-government after the abdications of Charles IV and Ferdinand VII at Bayonne, and that the political instability in Spain dictated that Venezuelans rule themselves, despite the brotherhood they shared with Spaniards. The seven provinces were Caracas Province, Cumaná Province, Barinas Province, Margarita Province, Barcelona Province, Mérida Province and Trujillo Province.

The three remaining provinces (Maracaibo Province, Coro Province and Guayana Province) did not take part in the Venezuelan congress and opted to stay under Spanish rule.

The declaration proclaimed a new nation named the American Confederacy of Venezuela and was mainly written by Cristóbal Mendoza and Juan Germán Roscio.

With this declaration, Venezuela became the first independent republic of Spanish America, and the fire of that declaration, fueled by external conflict, would spread the ideals of independence throughout all of the lands of Latin America.

== Resolution ==
On July 3, 1811, delegates from the first National Constituent Congress convened at the Santa Rosa de Lima Chapel in Caracas regarding the matter of independence. Two days later, the matter was resolved when Congress voted to officially declare independence 40–4. Then, with the permission of the secretary general, Francisco Isnardi, Mendoza and Roscio presented the document to Congress for discussion. Roscio and Isnardi then spoke following the reading of the declaration.

It was ratified by Congress on July 7, 1811, with 43 votes for and one vote against, and recorded in the Congress's Book of Minutes on August 17, 1811, in Caracas.

The anniversary of this declaration is celebrated as Independence Day. The original Book of Minutes of the first Congress of Venezuela is in the Federal Legislative Palace in Caracas.

The document is kept at the Casa de Las Primeras Letras. The signature of president Hugo Chávez was added to an exhibited copy of the document on May 31, 2013, by the Maduro administration, as an homage to the former president. This resulted in outrage among various sectors opposing said administration.

== See also ==
- Venezuelan Independence
- First Republic of Venezuela
- Solemn Act of the Declaration of Independence of Northern America
- Argentine Declaration of Independence
