= Magdalena Department (Gran Colombia) =

Department of Gran Colombia

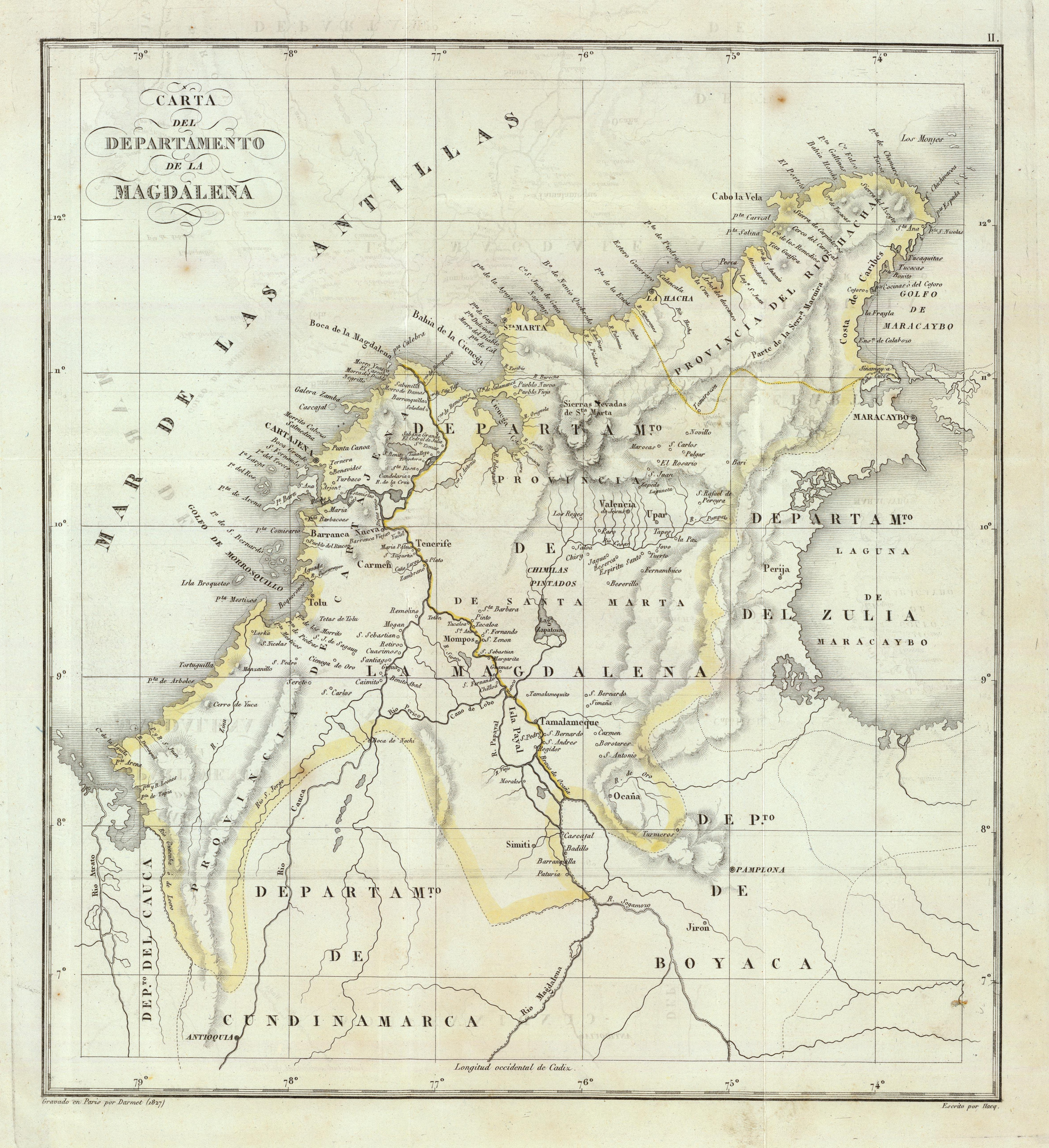

Magdalena Department was one of the departments of Gran Colombia In the east it bordered Zulia Department, in the south Boyaca Department, Cundinamarca Department, Cauca Department.

== Provinces ==
- Cartagena Province
- Riohacha Province
- Santa Marta Province
