= Venezuela Department (1824) =

Venezuela Department was one of the departments of Gran Colombia from 1824 to 1830 (the previous department was substantially larger).

It had borders to

- Atlantic Ocean in the North.
- Orinoco Department in the East.
- Apure Department in the South.
- Zulia Department in the West.

== Subdivisions ==
2 provinces and several cantons.

- Caracas Province. Capital: Caracas. Cantones: Caracas, Calabozo, Caucagua, Chaguaramas, La Guaira, La Victoria, Villa de Cura, Ocumare y San Sebastián.
- Carabobo Province. Capital: Valencia. Cantones: Valencia, Barquisimeto, Nirgua, Puerto Cabello, San Felipe y Tocuyo.
