= Cuenca Province (Gran Colombia) =

Cuenca Province was a province of Gran Colombia. With the 1824 reform of the subdivisions of Gran Colombia, it became part of the Azuay Department.
