= Socorro Province =

Coordinates: 6°32′N 73°12′W

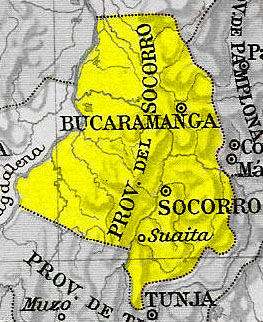
1810

The Province of Socorro, also known as the Governorate of Socorro during the Spanish Empire, was an administrative and territorial entity in New Granada created on November 27, 1795 as a corregimiento within the Viceroyalty of New Granada. The province was created out of the northern territories of the Province of Tunja and the western territories of the Province of Pamplona.

During the early stages of the Spanish American Wars of Independence (1810-1816), the Province of Socorro joined the United Provinces of New Granada. During the period known as Gran Colombia, the province became part of the Department of Boyacá, which back then covered the eastern sections of the territory of modern-day Colombia.

After the dissolution of Gran Colombia, the province joined the Republic of New Granada, a centralist nation, until the federalist system was adopted by New Granada in 1858 and the region became one of the constituent provinces of the Sovereign State of Santander.

== See also ==
- Revolt of the Comuneros (New Granada)
