= Santa Marta Province =

Santa Marta Province Santa Marta
- Province
- 1533–1857
- Santa Marta Province in New Granada c. 1810

- Santa Marta Province in New Granada c. 1855
- Capital: Santa Marta
- Demonym: Samari(a/o), Neogranadin(a/o)
- Area
  - Coordinates: 11°15′11″N 70°13′00″W
- Population
  - 1789 est.: 39,942
  - 1835 est.: 46,587
  - 1843 est.: 45,677
  - Type: Governorate
- Historical era: Spanish colonization of the Americas; Colombian War of Independence
  - Established: February 16 1533
  - Dissolved: June 15 1857
Preceded by
Province of Tierra Firme
Succeeded by
Riohacha Province
Magdalena Department (Gran Colombia)
Mompox Province
[[Provincia de Ocaña]]

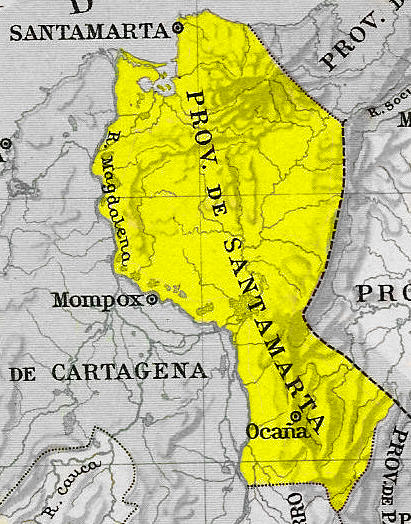
Map

Santa Marta Province was a province of New Granada.
