= Orinoco Department =

Orinoco Department Departamento del Orinoco
- Coordinates: 8°5′N 63°31′W
- Created: 1824
- Dissolved: 1830
- capital: Cumaná

Population
  - Total: 175,000

Orinoco Department was one of the departments of Gran Colombia created in 1824. Its territory was split from the Venezuela Department.

It had borders to

- Apure Department in the West.
- Boyacá Department in the West.

== Provinces ==
- Cumaná Province. Capital: Cumaná. Cantons: Cumaná, Carupano, Cumanacoa, Maturín, Cariaco, Aragua Cumanés and Río Caribes.
- Guayana Province. Capital: Angostura. Cantons: Angostura, Barceloneta, Alto Orinoco (capital Caicara), Caroni, Guayana Vieja, Caura (capital cabecera Moitaco), La Pastora and Upata.
- Barcelona Province. Capital: Barcelona. Cantons: Barcelona, Aragua, Pilar, Piritu, San Diego and Villa del Pao.
- Margarita Province. Capital: Asunción. Cantons: Asunción and Norte (capital Santa Ana del Norte).
