= Carabobo Province =

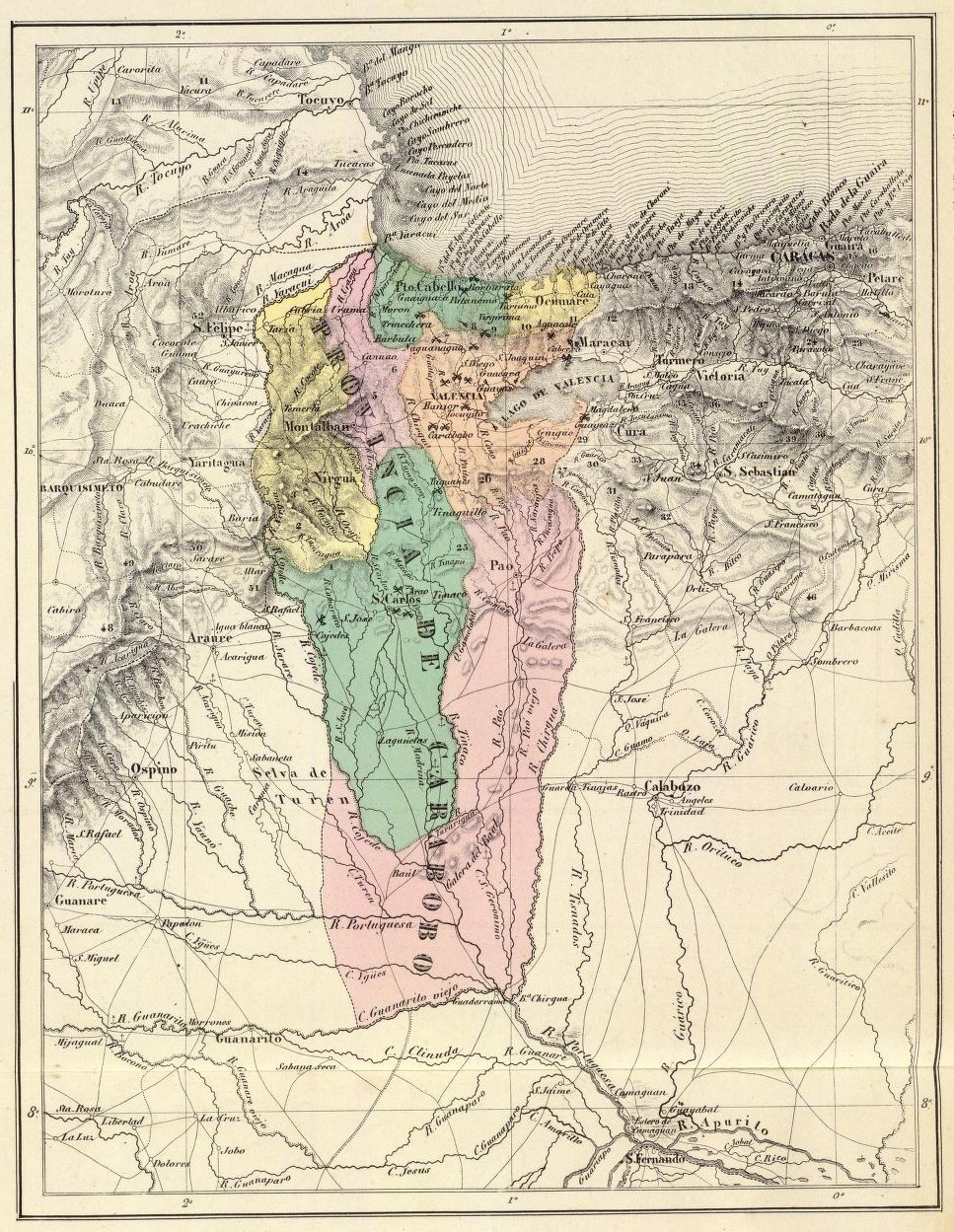
Carabobo Province in 1840. Map by Agostino Codazzi.

Carabobo Province (1824–1864) was one of the provinces of Gran Colombia, and later one of the provinces of Venezuela, after Venezuelan independence in 1830. It was split from Caracas Province. In Gran Colombia it belonged to the Venezuela Department which was created in 1824.

In 1832 the Province of Barquisimeto was split from Carabobo. In 1855 Nirgua was split to become the Yaracuy Province and San Carlos to become Cojedes Province.

It became the state of Carabobo with the creation of the States of Venezuela in 1864.

== Cantons ==
- 1824-1832: Valencia, Puerto Cabello, Ocumare, San Carlos, Pao, Nirgua, San Felipe, Tocuyo, Quíbor, Barquisimeto, Yaritagua and Carora.
- 1832-1855: Valencia, Puerto Cabello, Montalbán and Ocumare, Nirgua, San Carlos
- 1855-1864: Valencia, Puerto Cabello, Montalbán and Ocumare
