= Casanare Province =

Province of Gran Colombia

Coordinates: 5°12′N 74°53′W

Casanare Province was one of the provinces of Gran Colombia.

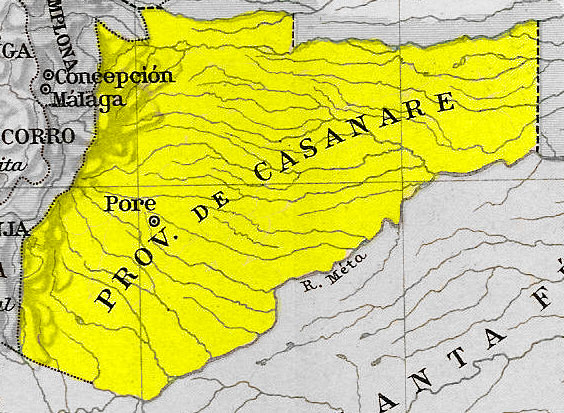
Map, 1810

== History ==
It belonged to the Boyacá Department, which was created in 1824.

The capital was Moreno, now called Paz de Ariporo.

Watercolors painted in 1856 by Manuel María Paz provide early depictions of the Guahibo and Saliba people in Casanare Province.

== See also ==
- Casanare Department
- Casanare River
