= Cauca Department (Gran Colombia) =

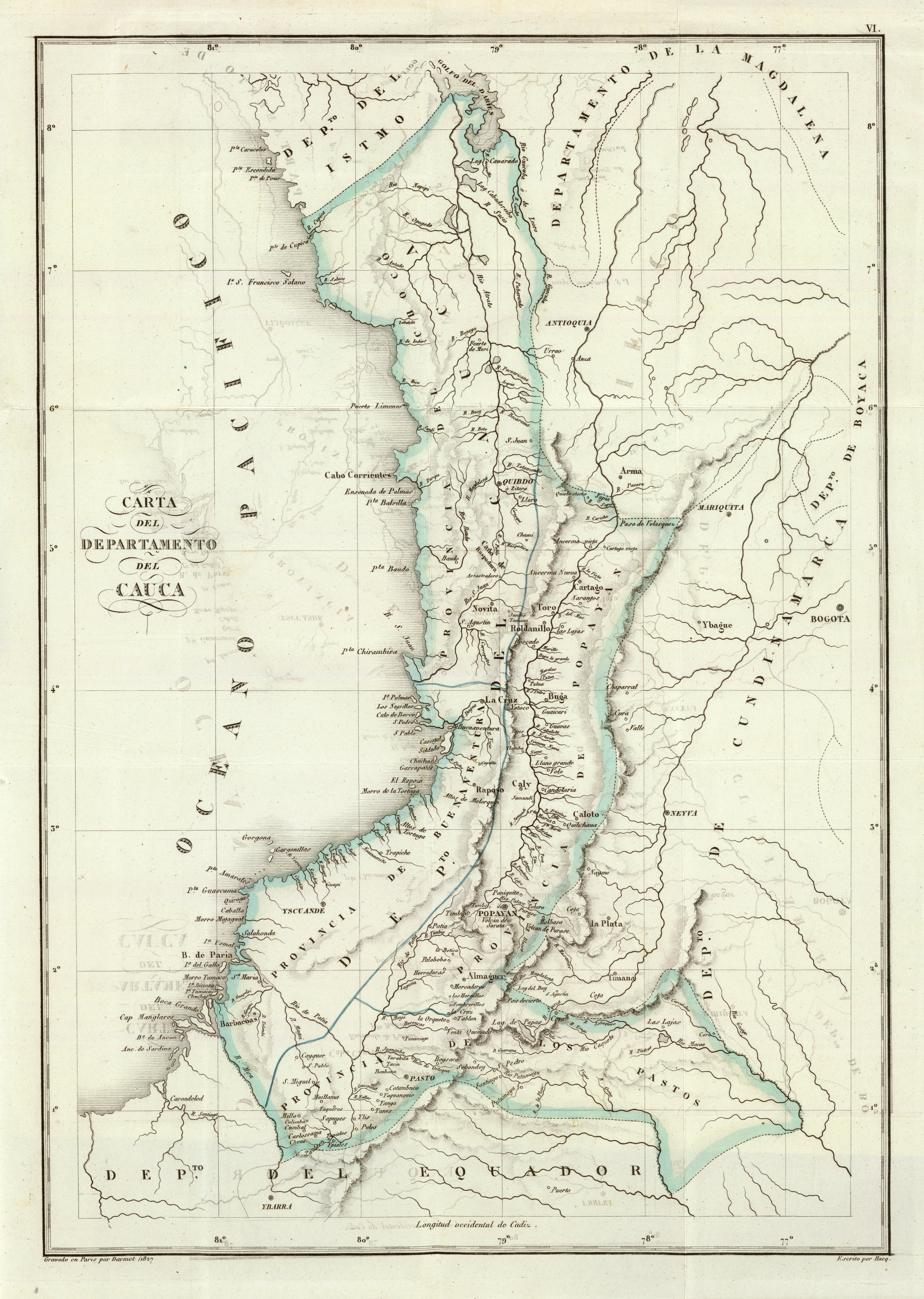

Cauca Department was one of the departments of Gran Colombia.

It was divided into 4 provinces:

- Popayán Province
- Buenaventura Province
- Chocó Province
- Pasto Province
