= Trujillo Province (Gran Colombia) =

Trujillo Province was a province in the Zulia Department of Gran Colombia.

== Cantons ==
- Trujillo Canton - Trujillo
- Boconó Canton - Boconó
- Escuque Canton - Escuque
- Carache Canton - Carache
