= Zulia Department =

Zulia Department Departamento del Zulia
- Coordinates: 10°34′N 71°44′W
- Country: Gran Colombia
- Created: 1824
- Dissolved: 1830
- Capital: Maracaibo

Population
  - Total: 162,000

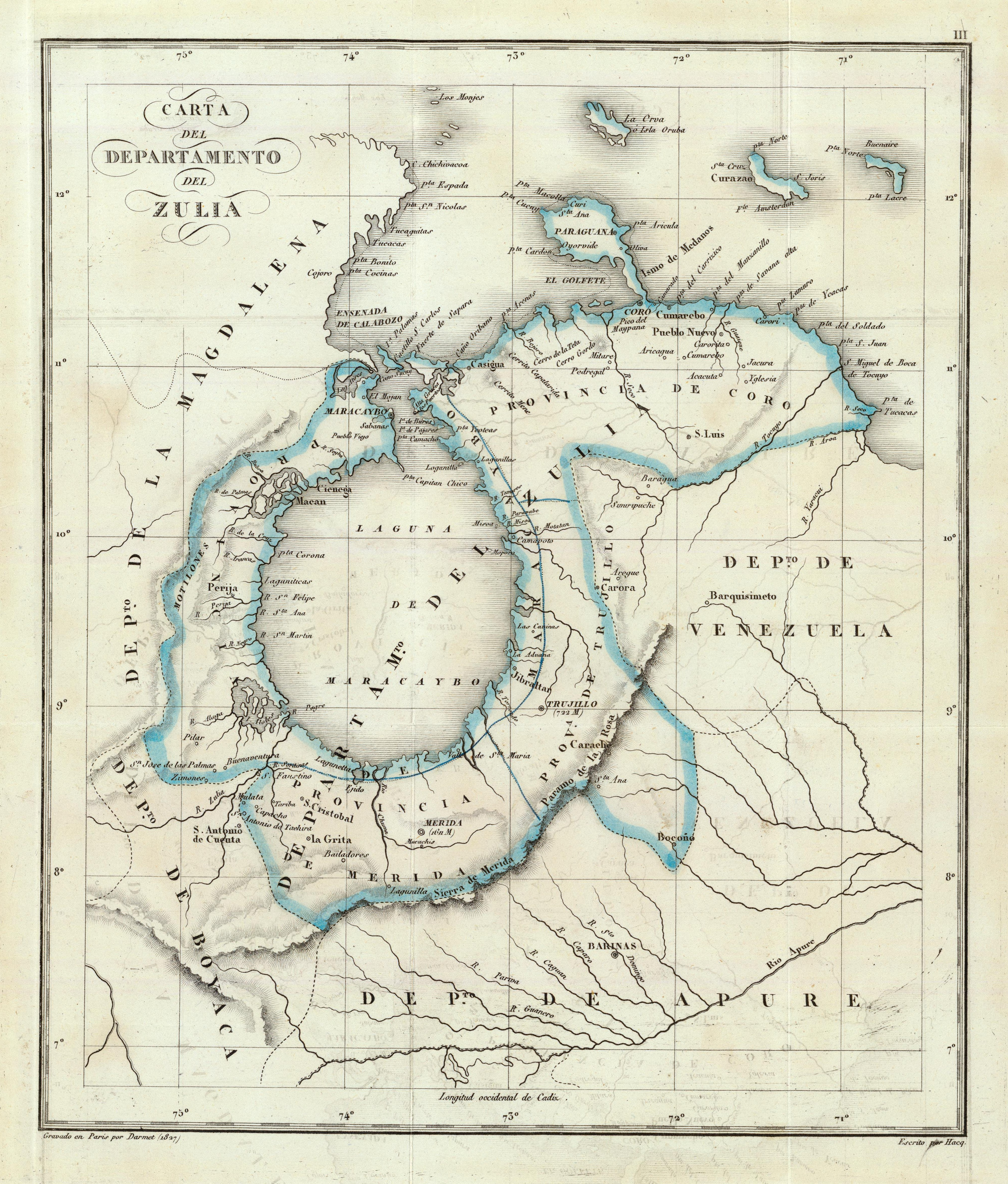

Zulia Department from 1824 to 1830 was one of the departments of Gran Colombia. It was split from the Venezuela Department.

It encompassed 4 provinces: Maracaybo/Maracaibo, Coro Province, Mérida Province and Trujillo Province.
