= Tunja Province =

Province of Gran Colombia

Coordinates: 5°32′N 73°22′W

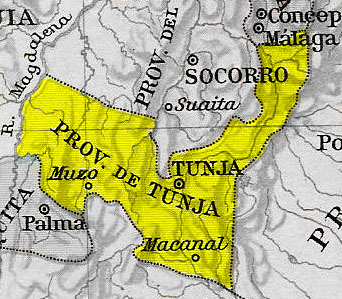
1810

The Province of Tunja, also known as the Governorate of Tunja during the Spanish Empire, was an administrative and territorial entity in New Granada created on August 7, 1539 as a corregimiento within the Viceroyalty of Peru. A royal decree (real cédula), issued by king Philip V of Spain on 1717, created the Viceroyalty of New Granada and transferred the province to this new territory.

During the early stages of the Spanish American Wars of Independence (1810-1816), Tunja joined the United Provinces of New Granada and served as its capital. During the period known as Gran Colombia, the province became part of the Department of Boyacá, which back then covered the eastern sections of the territory of modern-day Colombia.

After the dissolution of Gran Colombia, the province joined the Republic of New Granada, a centralist nation, until the federalist system was adopted by New Granada in 1858 and the region became one of the constituent provinces of the Sovereign State of Boyacá.

== Subdivisions ==
=== New Kingdom of Granada ===
==== Jurisdictions around 1701 ====
Jurisdiction	Capital	Full Spanish name	Subdivisions		Church jurisdiction
Jurisdiction	Capital	Full Spanish name	Partidos	Full Spanish name	Archdiocese and diocese
Leyva	Leyva	Jurisdicción de Leyva	Leyva	Jurisdicción de Leyva	Santa Fe
Leyva	Leyva	Jurisdicción de Leyva	Sáchica	Corregimiento de Sáchica	Santa Fe
Muzo	Muzo	Jurisdicción de Muzo	Muzo	Jurisdicción de Muzo	Santa Fe
Pamplona	Pamplona	Jurisdicción de Pamplona	Pamplona	Jurisdicción de Pamplona	Santa Fe
Salazar	Salazar	Alcaldía Mayor de Salazar	Salazar	Alcaldía Mayor de Salazar	Santa Fe
Socorro	Socorro	Tenencia de Corregimiento de Socorro	Socorro	Tenencia de Corregimiento de Socorro	Santa Fe
Socorro	Socorro	Tenencia de Corregimiento de Socorro	San Gil	Jurisdicción de San Gil	Santa Fe
Tunja	Tunja	Jurisdicción de Tunja	Chita	Corregimiento de Chita	Santa Fe
Tunja	Tunja	Jurisdicción de Tunja	Chivatá	Corregimiento de Chivatá	Santa Fe
Tunja	Tunja	Jurisdicción de Tunja	Duitama	Corregimiento de Duitama	Santa Fe
Tunja	Tunja	Jurisdicción de Tunja	Gámeza	Corregimiento de Gámeza	Santa Fe
Tunja	Tunja	Jurisdicción de Tunja	Paipa	Corregimiento de Paipa	Santa Fe
Tunja	Tunja	Jurisdicción de Tunja	Sogamoso	Corregimiento de Sogamoso	Santa Fe
Tunja	Tunja	Jurisdicción de Tunja	Tenza	Corregimiento de Tenza	Santa Fe
Tunja	Tunja	Jurisdicción de Tunja	Tunja	Jurisdicción de Tunja	Santa Fe
Tunja	Tunja	Jurisdicción de Tunja	Turmequé	Corregimiento de Turmequé	Santa Fe
Vélez	Vélez	Jurisdicción de Vélez	Vélez	Jurisdicción de Vélez	Santa Fe
