= Pamplona Province =

Coordinates: 7°22′N 72°39′W

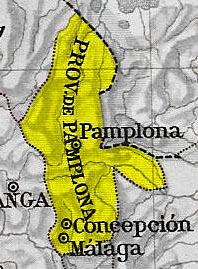
1810

The Province of Pamplona, also known as the Governorate of Pamplona during the Spanish Empire, was an administrative and territorial entity in New Granada created on August 3, 1555 as a corregimiento within the Viceroyalty of Peru. A royal decree (real cédula), issued by king Philip V of Spain on 1717, created the Viceroyalty of New Granada and transferred the province to this new territory.

During the early stages of the Spanish American Wars of Independence (1810-1816), the Province of Pamplona joined the United Provinces of New Granada. During the period known as Gran Colombia, the province became part of the Department of Boyacá, which back then covered the eastern sections of the territory of modern-day Colombia.

After the dissolution of Gran Colombia, the province joined the Republic of New Granada, a centralist nation, until the federalist system was adopted by New Granada in 1858 and the region became one of the constituent provinces of the Sovereign State of Santander.
