= Popayán Province =

Coordinates: 2°27′N 76°37′W

Popayán Province was first a Spanish jurisdiction under the Royal Audience of Quito and the Royal Audience of Santafé, and after independence, was one of the provinces of the Cauca Department (Gran Colombia), later becoming the Republic of New Granada.

Watercolors of Popayán Province painted in 1853 by Manuel María Paz show indigenous peoples wearing the ruana in the village of Pancitará (or Pansitará), and women called Llapangas known for "embroidery, dressmaking, or shop work," who wore embroidered cotton blouses, flannel skirts, and "neat, well-groomed bare feet."

== Maps ==

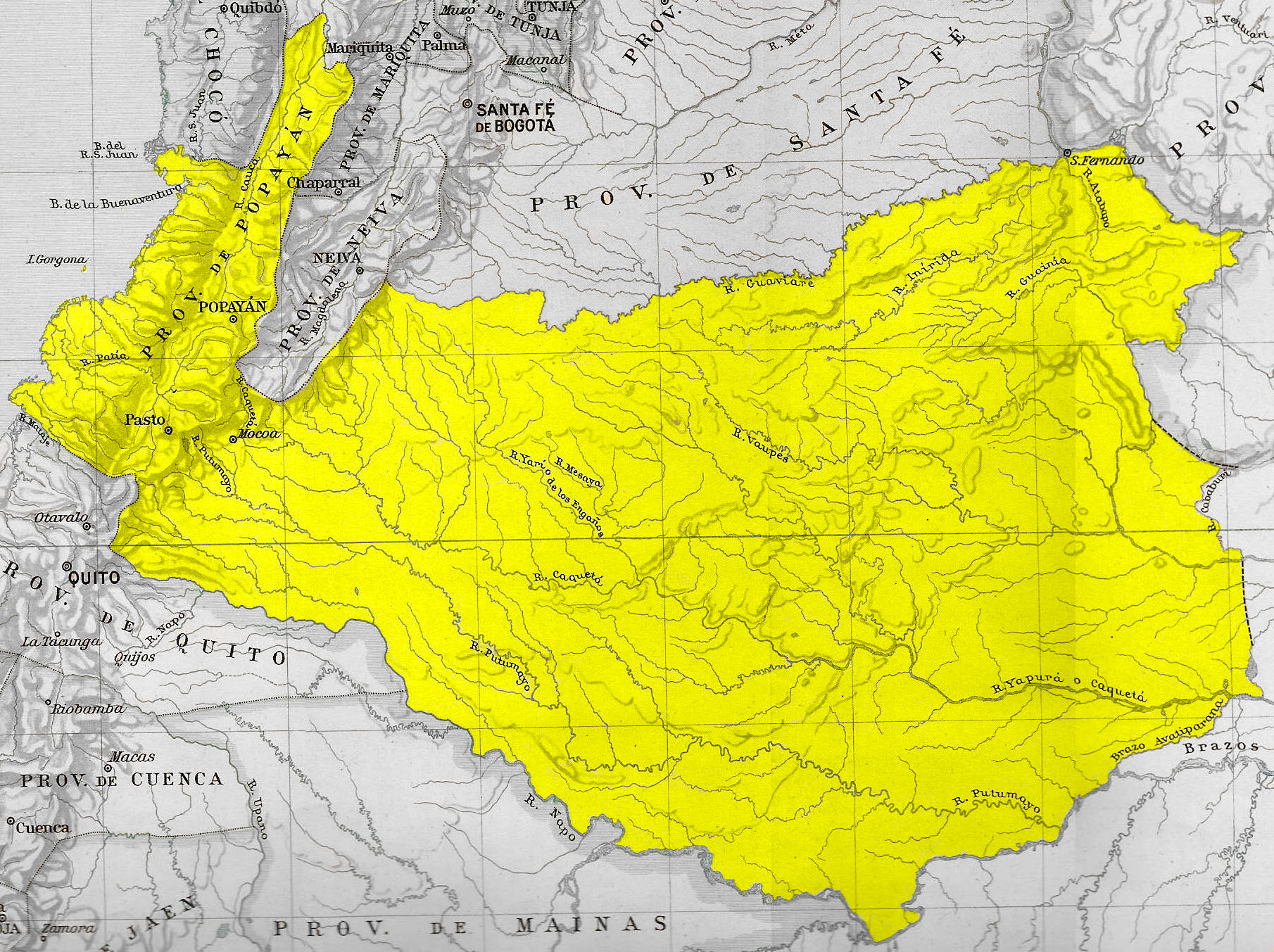
