= Riohacha Province =

Coordinates: 11°33′N 72°53′W

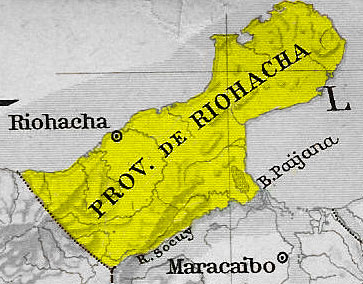

Riohacha Province was a province of Gran Colombia. With the 1824 changes in the subdivisions of Gran Colombia, it became part of Magdalena Department. Riohacha[a] (Spanish pronunciation: [rjoˈa.tʃa]; Wayuu: Süchiimma[b]), is a city in the Riohacha Municipality in the northern Caribbean Region of Colombia by the mouth of the Ranchería River and the Caribbean Sea. Riohacha is the capital city of La Guajira Department.
