= Barcelona Province (Venezuela) =

Former province in Venezuela

Coordinates: 10°04′N 64°43′W

Modern Anzoátegui State, similar in size and location to the former Barcelona Province

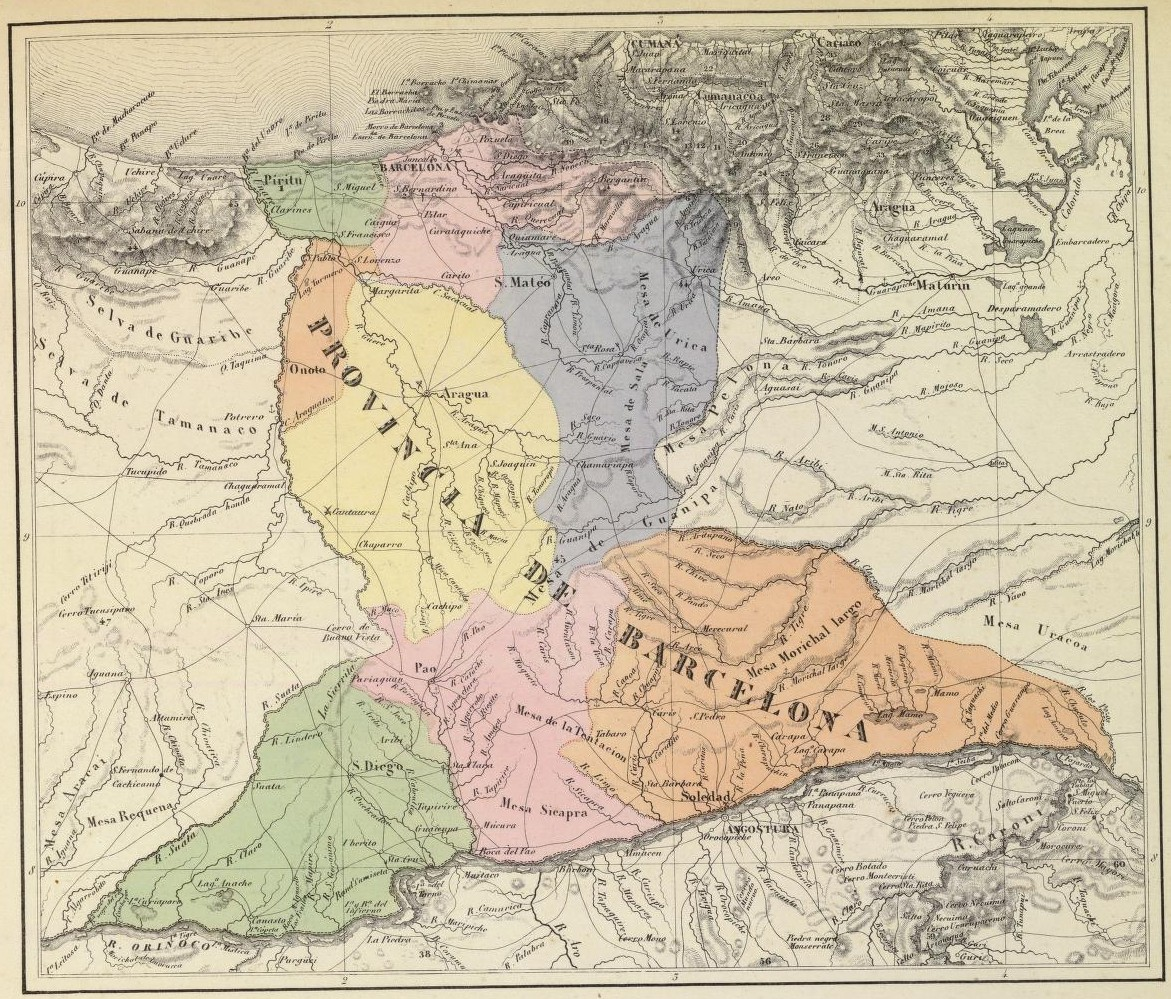
1840 map of the province by Agostino Codazzi

Barcelona Province (1811–1864) was one of the provinces of Venezuela which signed the 1811 Venezuelan Declaration of Independence from the Spanish Empire. It became one of the provinces of Gran Colombia after Venezuela's independence from Gran Colombia in 1830. During the times of Gran Colombia, it was part of the Orinoco Department.

It corresponded roughly to the current Venezuelan state of Anzoátegui, and it shared similarities with the short-lived New Catalonia Province (1633–1654), founded by Joan Orpí. Like Orpí's province, its capital city was New Barcelona, founded by Orpí.

Following the Federal War it became Barcelona State in 1864. In 1909, it was renamed to Anzoátegui, in honor of José Antonio Anzoátegui.
