= Mérida Province (Venezuela) =

Province of Gran Colombia (1811-30); province of Venezuela (1830-64)

Coordinates: 8°36′N 71°08′W

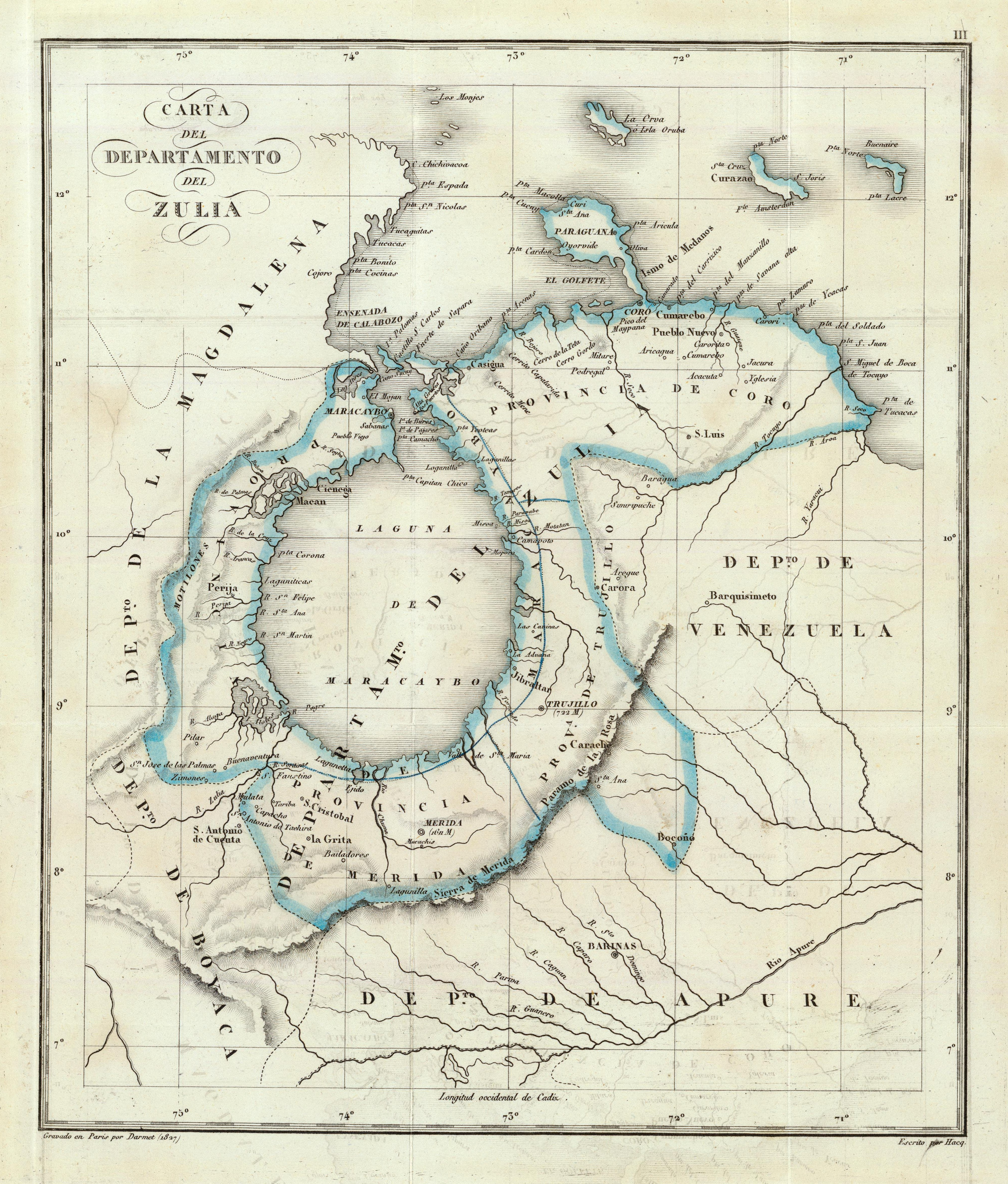
Zulia Department in 1827, Mérida was in the south

Mérida Province (1811 - 1864) was one of the provinces of Gran Colombia, until the independence of Venezuela in 1830, when it became one of the Provinces of Venezuela. In Gran Colombia it belonged to the Zulia Department which was created in 1824.

Following the Federal War the States of Venezuela were created in 1864, and the Province was replaced by the state of Mérida.
