= Coro Province =

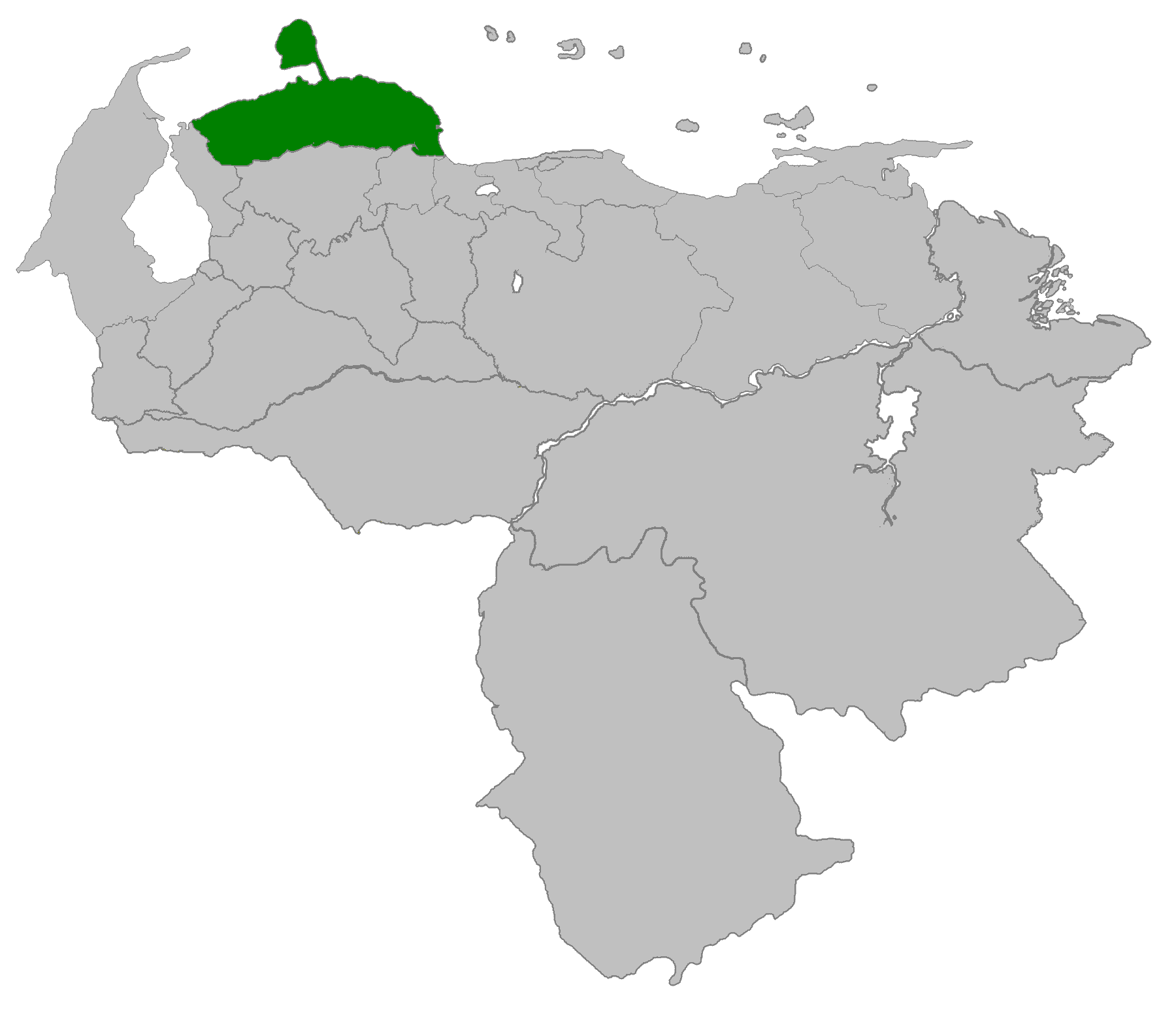
Coro Province

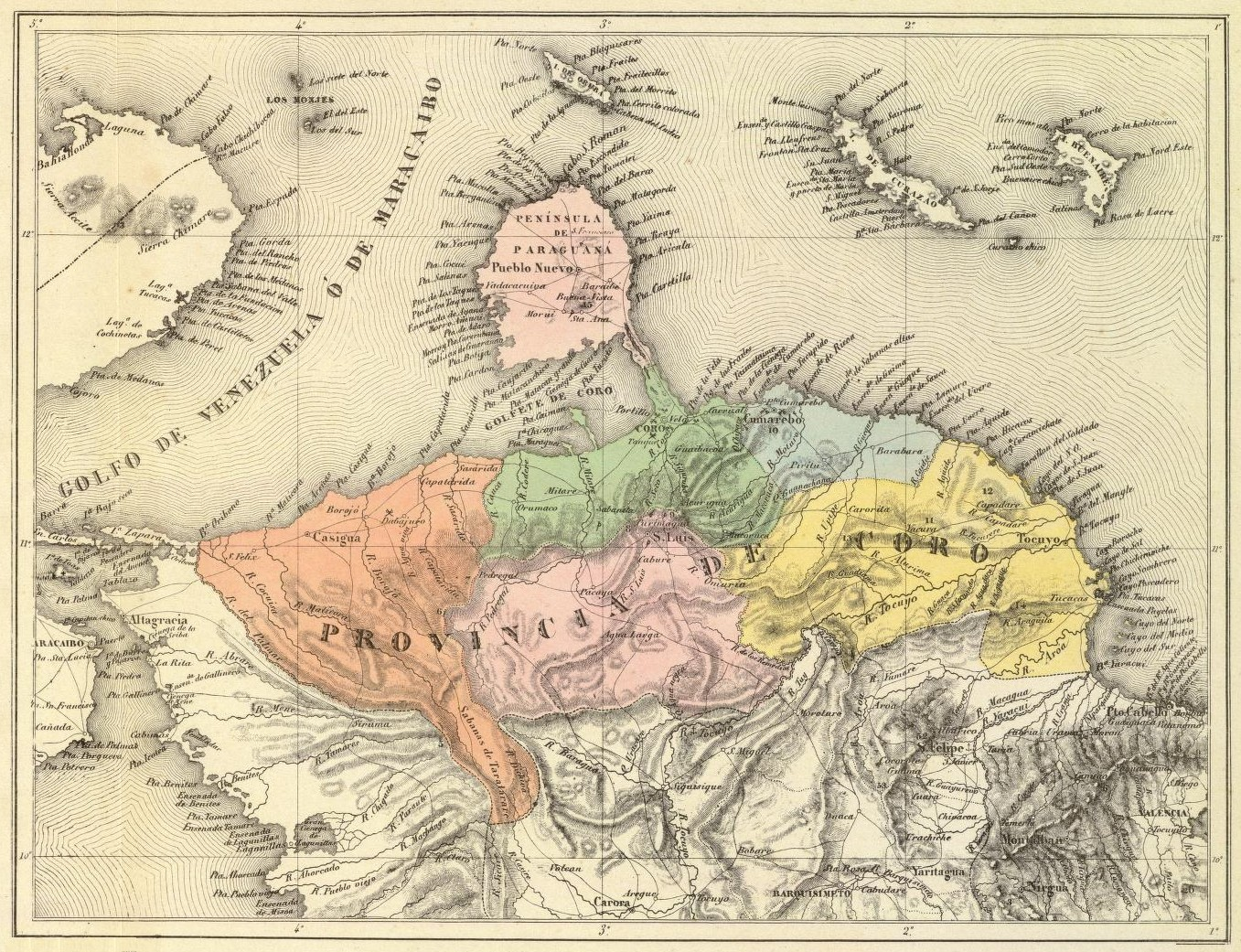
Coro Province in 1840. Map by Agostino Codazzi.

Coro Province (1811 - 1864) was a province in the Zulia Department of Gran Colombia, and later one of the provinces of Venezuela, after Venezuelan independence in 1830. In 1864 it became one of the States of Venezuela, as Coro State, and was renamed Falcón State in 1874.

The Province was created in 1811 in royalist opposition to the Venezuelan War of Independence, and recognised by royal decree in 1815. In 1821, with the defeat of royalist forces, it was incorporated into Gran Colombia.

== Cantons ==
- Coro Canton
- Casigua Canton
- Cumarebo Canton
- Paraguaná Canton cabecera Pueblo Nuevo
- San Luis Canton
