= New Andalusia Province =

Province of Spanish colonial Colombia, Venezuela and Guyana

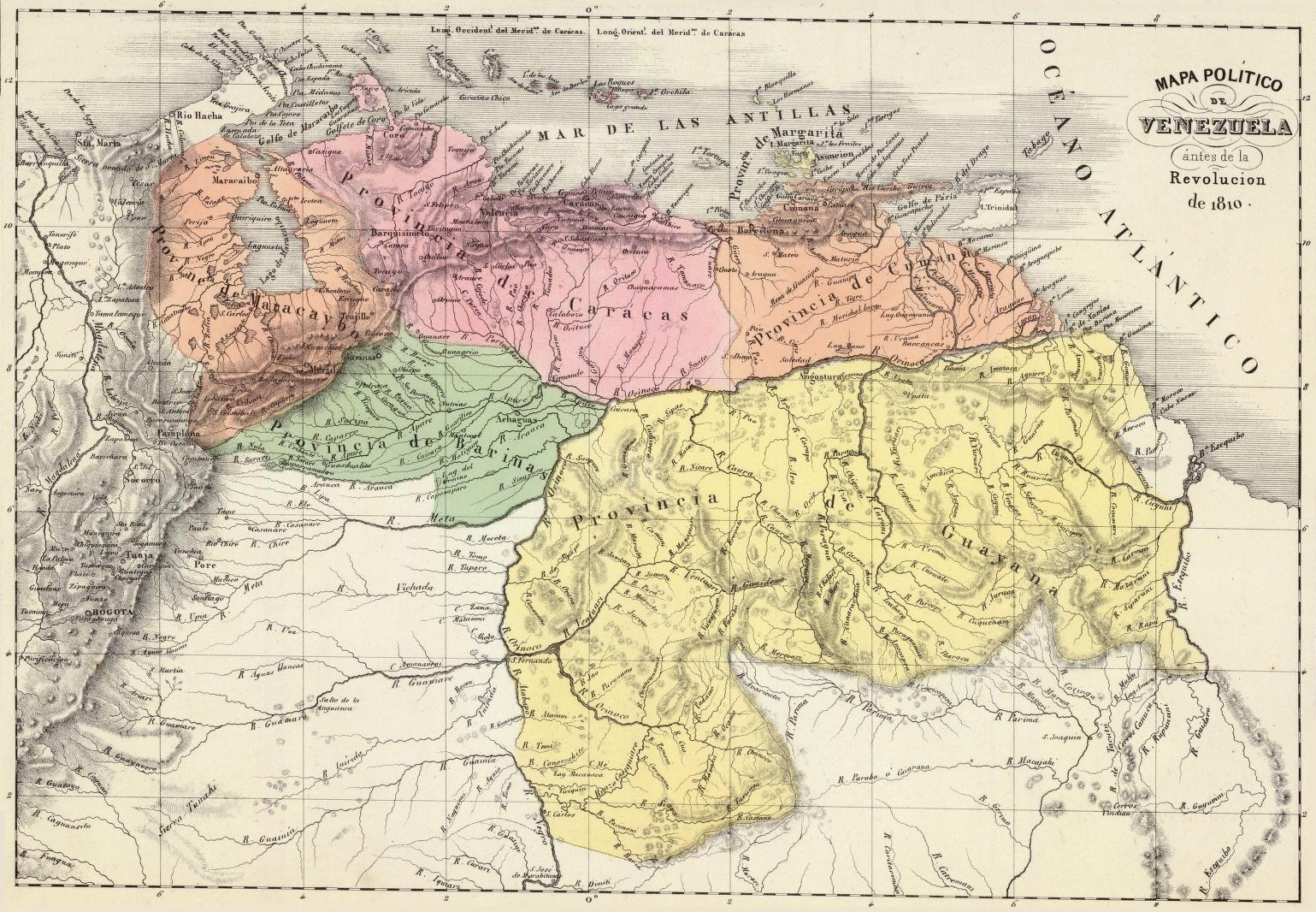
Map of Venezuela in 1810, by Agostino Codazzi; Cumaná Province is in orange at the top right.

New Andalusia Province or Province of Cumaná (1537–1864) was a province of the Spanish Empire, and later of Gran Colombia and Venezuela. It included the territory of present-day Venezuelan states Sucre, Anzoátegui and Monagas. Its most important cities were the Capital City Cumaná and New Barcelona.

== Spanish Empire ==
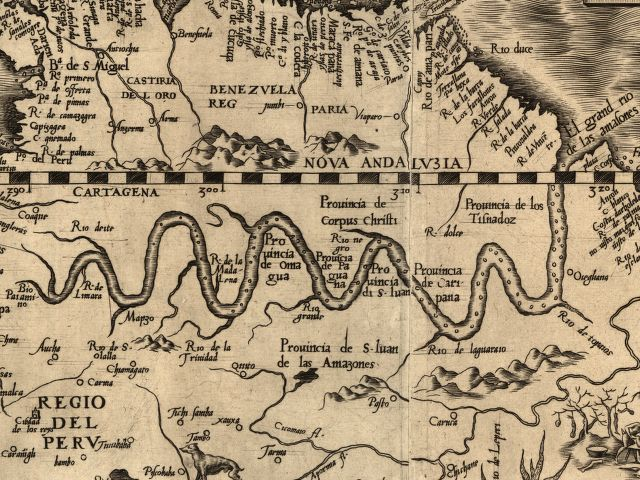
New Andalusia and Paria on a Spanish map of 1562.

Its provincial capital, Cumaná, was refounded in 1569 by explorer Diego Hernández de Serpa. The Province originally comprised what is now eastern Venezuela, western Guyana, and far northern Brazil. In the following centuries, its jurisdiction was reduced to Cumaná and Barcelona and was synonymous with Cumaná Province.

Early in its history, the conquistador Joan Orpí founded a new Province, of Nueva Cataluña (New Catalonia), also known as New Barcelona after its capital, Barcelona, partly from territory belonging to New Andalusia. This lasted from 1637 to 1654, when it was incorporated into New Andalusia. Guayana Province (created 1585) provided a southern boundary, while Venezuela Province provided a western one.

For most of its existence, the Royal Audience of Santo Domingo oversaw its administrative and judicial matters. In the late 18th century, it was incorporated into the newly created Captaincy General of Venezuela.

== Gran Colombia ==
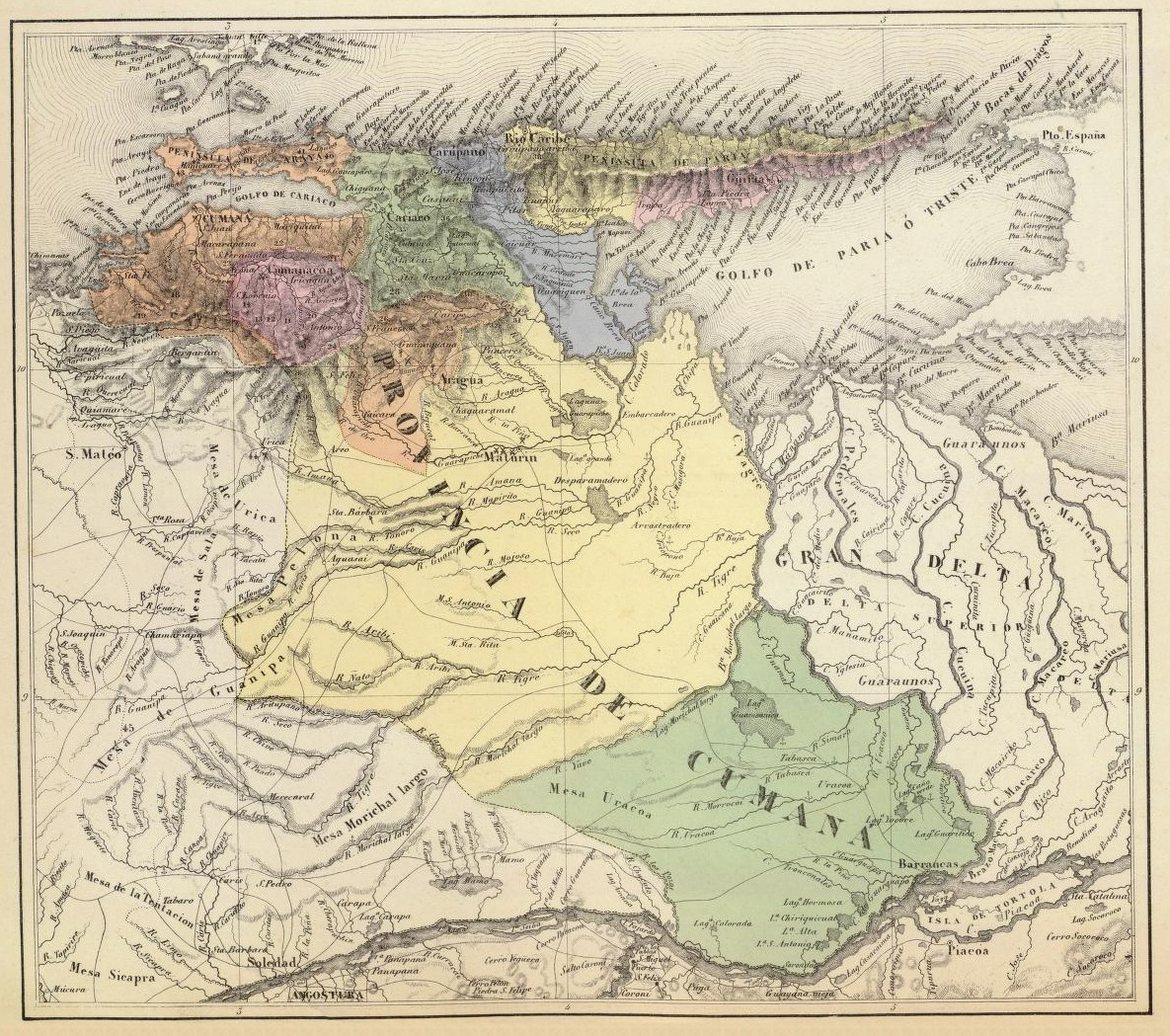
1840 map of the Province by Agostino Codazzi.

Following the Venezuelan Declaration of Independence (1811), the Province became one of the Provinces of Gran Colombia (after 1824, within the Orinoco Department).

Capital: Cumaná.

Cantones:

- Cumaná,
- Carupano,
- Cumanacoa,
- Maturín,
- Cariaco,
- Aragua Cumanés
- Río Caribes.

Following Venezuelan independence in 1830, it became a Province of Venezuela, until the creation of the States of Venezuela in 1864. Between 1810 and 1840 it lost the Canton Piacoa (covering the Orinoco River delta) to Guayana Province; this later became the state of Delta Amacuro.
