= Colombian Civil War of 1854 =

- Part of the Colombian Civil Wars
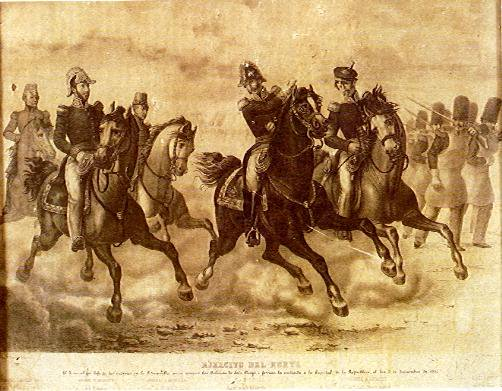
- Generals Herrera, Cipriano de Mosquera and Codazzi during the Civil War
Date	17 April – 4 December 1854
Location	Colombia
Result	Victory for the Constitutionalist coalition

Belligerents
Constitutionalist coalition Golgota Liberals; Conservative Party	Regeneration Army; Draconian Liberals; Democratic Societies

Commanders and leaders
José de Obaldía; Cipriano de Mosquera; Joaquín París Ricaurte; Pedro Alcántara Herrán; José Hilario López; Tomás de Herrera †; Manuel María Franco †; Anselmo Pineda Gómez; Agustín Codazzi; Julio Arboleda Pombo	José María Melo; Juan José Nieto Gil; Francisco Obregón

Strength
11,000	11,042

Casualties and losses
- 4,000 deaths

The Colombian Civil War of 1854 was a civil conflict that took place in the Republic of New Granada (today Colombia). It was the popular response supported by both Liberals and Conservatives against the coup d'état orchestrated by General José María Melo on 17 April 1854.

== Background ==
The Liberals had won the 1848–49 Colombian presidential election and the Colombian Civil War of 1851 and were ruling the country for six years.
Among the causes of this civil war was the implementation of Free trade and the suppression of all protectionist barriers, an important Liberal principle. These changes had such an impact that they divided the Liberals into two factions : the Golgotas who defended radical free trade, and the Draconians, mainly local artisans, who defended some protectionist measures. Various factions of the army, aristocrats and popular sectors, seeking to implement democratic ideas, allied themselves with the artisans who demanded the reintroduction of protection tariffs.

In the Presidential elections of 1853, José María Obando had presented himself on behalf of the "Draconians", and had defeated Tomás de Herrera, candidate for the "Gólgotas" or Radicals. Nevertheless, the "Gólgotas" in Congress managed to introduce a new ultra-liberal Constitution that same year, which only increased tensions in the country.

== Coup and Civil War ==
By April 1854, the Draconian artisans and intellectuals believed the dismissal of Obando by Congress was imminent, which led their leader, General José María Melo, to propose to Obando to close the Congress and declare himself Dictator. Obando refused and on 17 April Melo took power himself, dissolved the House, abolished the Constitution and arrested the President and his ministers.

On 17 April, Melo had 1,000 infantry soldiers and 500 cavalry under his command. With the help of the armed artisans' Democratic Societies, he organized his forces into the so-called "Regeneration Army", calling into service all civilian members of the Auxiliary National Guard and veterans who had fought in the civil war of 1851. By mid-May he had already doubled the number of his troops. At the beginning of August, the "Regeneration Army" totaled 11,042 troops.

When the Dictatorship was proclaimed, his opponents also took up arms. Vice President José de Obaldía assumed command of the Constitutionalist coalition, which was formed with Gólgotas Liberals and troops belonging to the Conservative Party.
In many parts of the country, rebellions against the dictatorship broke out. Former president José Hilario López, commander of the Army in the south, defeated the Melo supporters in Cali, Buenaventura and Cartago. Tomás Cipriano de Mosquera's troops dominated the Caribbean region starting from Barranquilla and confronted the governor of the province of Cartagena Juan José Nieto Gil, who supported the Melo government. Nieto Gil was diposed by the Constitutionalists on 12 June.

The "Regeneration Army" defeated that of General Tomás Herrera in Zipaquirá and Tiquizá in May and marched to Boyacá where they forced the troops of General Juan José Reyes to retire to Casanare in early July. But on 12 July, they suffered a defeat in the Battle of Bucaramanga.

Melo remained in power for eight months, but finally the "Constitutionalist" troops of Pedro Alcántara Herrán, Tomás Cipriano de Mosquera, Julio Arboleda and José Hilario López, located in the north and south of the country and totaling 11,000 men, united and surrounded the 7,000 Melistas, who by autumn only held the city of Bogotá.

On 4 December of the same year, the victorious alliance entered Bogotá, after defeating the Melista army and its allies, the "Draconian" Liberals and artisans. The latter presented tenacious resistance during the final assault on the capital in which general Tomás de Herrera was killed. This is why the winning party banished hundreds of artisans to the unhealthy area surrounding the Chagres River in Panama, most of whom died during the journey on foot. The conflict cost about 4,000 lives.

== Consequences ==
After his defeat, José María Melo was tried and deposed by Congress. Mosquera demanded that Melo would be shot, but Herrán opposed his execution and he was exiled instead. Former President Obando, who had taken refuge in the nuncio's residence, was tried and removed by Congress from his position as president, for not preventing Melo's coup.

José de Obaldía became acting president until 1 April 1855, when Congress elected Conservative Congressman Manuel María Mallarino Ibargüen as new president.
