= 1852–53 Colombian presidential election =

- 1853
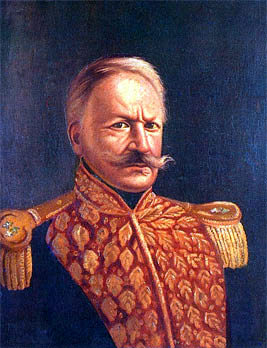

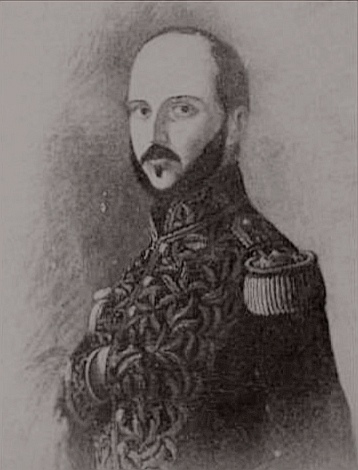
Candidate	José María Obando	Tomás de Herrera
Party	Liberal	Liberal
Electoral vote	1,548	329
President before election
José Hilario López
Liberal
Elected President
José María Obando
Liberal

Presidential elections were held in the Republic of New Granada in 1852 and 1853. The electoral college was elected in 1852 and subsequently elected the president in March 1853.

The Liberal Party, then in power under General José Hilario López after winning the Colombian Civil War of 1851, was assured of victory. Its official candidate General José María Obando had little difficulty winning the election, with his only significant rival being his fellow Liberal Tomás Herrera, who was mainly supported by the Panamanian regionalist movement. The election victory was achieved with a pact of unity between the two factions of Liberalism, the Golgothians (radicals) and the Draconians (moderates).

== Results ==
=== Electoral college ===
Candidate	Party	Votes	%
José María Obando	Liberal	1,548	77.09
Tomás de Herrera	Liberal	329	16.38
Mariano Ospina Rodríguez		36	1.79
Rufino Cuervo y Barreto		16	0.80
Vicente Borrero		8	0.40
Antonio Olano		8	0.40
Manuel José Mosquera		4	0.20
Juan de Francisco Martín		3	0.15
Florentino González		2	0.10
Joaquín París Ricaurte		2	0.10
Evaristo Azuero		1	0.05
Juan Nepomuceno Azuero		1	0.05
Manuel Murillo Turo		1	0.05
Antonino Olano		1	0.05
Juan Clímaco Ordóñez		1	0.05
José de Jesús Quijano		1	0.05
Venancio Restrepo		1	0.05
Manuel Urquinaona		1	0.05
J.M.O.		1	0.05
Blank votes		43	2.14
Total		2,008	100.00
Source: Historia electoral colombiana
