= Joaquín París Ricaurte =

Colombian Army Officer, Independence War hero

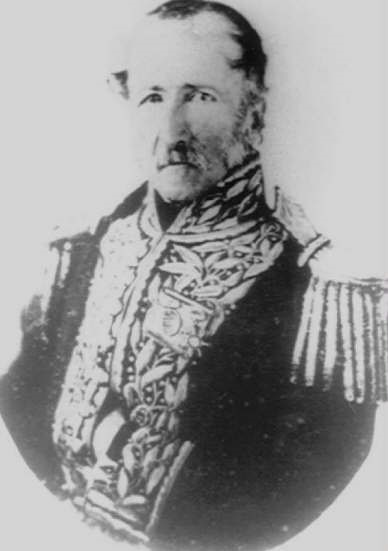
- París in dress uniform, c. 1860

Colombian Army Commander in Chief
- In office October 25, 1860 – April 1, 1861
- Preceded by: Pedro Alcántara Herrán
- Succeeded by: Ramón Espina Gámez

Personal details
- Born: August 18, 1795 Santa Fe, Viceroyalty of New Granada, Spanish Empire
- Died: October 2, 1868 (aged 73) Honda (Tolima), United States of Colombia
- Spouse: María Dolores De la Roche Domínguez
- Nickname: "The Manc of Bombona"

Military service
- Allegiance: United Provinces of New Granada; Gran Colombia; Republic of New Granada; Granadine Confederation
- Rank: General
- Battles/wars: Colombian War of Independence; Nariño's Southern Campaign; Battle of Cuchilla del Tambo; Battle of Vargas Swamp; Battle of Boyacá; Battle of Bomboná; Colombian Civil War (1860–1862)

Joaquín París y Ricaurte (Bogotá, Colombia, August 18, 1795 – Honda, Colombia, October 2, 1868) was a Colombian military officer and politician who fought in the Colombian War of Independence and various civil wars that took place in Colombia during the 19th century. París was later also commander-in-chief of the army and Secretary of War on various occasions.

Born to an aristocratic family in Santa Fe de Bogotá. París joined the Colombian independence movement at the young age of 15 enlisting as a cadet in the Auxiliary Battalion of Santa Fe in 1810. París fought in many of the initial battles of the Colombian War of Independence and was wounded various times and noted for his bravery in battle. During the Spanish reconquest of New Granada in 1816, París was captured by Spanish forces and was sentenced to serve a lengthy prison sentence in Puerto Cabello in Venezuela. He was able to escape as the ship he was transported in was attacked by French pirates who left him on Curaçao. París then sailed to Venezuela and rejoined the war effort under Simón Bolívar's command.

París played a decisive role in the 1819 New Granada campaign under the command of General Francisco de Paula Santander. He helped raise the Patriot army in Casanare and was eventually commander of the "Cazadores" battalion during the campaign, fighting in all the battles and participated in the bayonet charge across the Boyacá bridge in the Battle of Boyacá which liberated New Granada from Spanish control.

After briefly serving as military governor of Neiva, París participated in the Pasto Campaign of 1822 and fought at the Battle of Bomboná where he was again wounded, losing two fingers as he led the "Bogotá" Battalion in the battle. By 1827 he was promoted to Brigadier General.

París would later serve as Secretary of War in various governments as well as commander of the army, participating the in Colombian Civil war of 1839-1842 as well as the war to put down General José María Melo's dictatorship in 1854. Although retired, París was once again called back into service to serve as commander of the army during the Colombian Civil War (1860–1862), however by this point he was crippled by his ill health and age, he was defeated and the government was overthrown.

After that París finally retired to his hacienda near Honda where he died at the age of 73 and received full military honors from the Colombian government for his long service to the republic. París is considered one of the military heroes of Colombia's independence and some public schools and military units are named after him.

== Early life ==
Joaquín París y Ricaurte was born on August 18, 1795, in the capital of the Viceroyalty of New Granada, Santa Fe, a territorial entity of the Spanish Empire. Born to an aristocratic family, his parents were José Martín París and Genoveva Ricaurte. José was from an aristocratic family and was born in Madrid and came to Santa Fe to serve as the secretary of Viceroy of New Granada Messía de la Cerda. Génova was a criolla who belonged to an important family from Santa Fe but was born in Medellin as her father was governor of that province at the time of her birth. The two married in 1777 and had 9 children together with Joaquín being the last male child followed by his sister.

== Military career ==
On July 20, 1810, the people of Santa Fe revolted against the government of Viceroy Antonio Amar y Borbon and formed a revolutionary junta eventually leading to the removal of the Viceroy from his position which marked the beginning of the Colombian War of Independence. París's father, José Martín, formed part of the junta as one of its founding members and signed the Colombian Act of Independence. Joaquín, then only 15 years old, joined the revolutionary cause along with his 6 older brothers and enlisted as a cadet in one of the first battalions formed in the republican army the Auxiliary Battalion of Santa Fe. On August 20, 1810, he was promoted to Sub-lieutenant, París participated in one of the first battles of the Colombian War of Independence when his battalion was deployed to the south of the country under the command of Colonel Antonio Baraya where they fought the Spanish royalist forces at the Battle of Bajo Palacé on March 28, 1811. The patriots managed to defeat the royalist army and prevented the Cauca Province from falling under royalist control, París fought bravely and was wounded in his knee, after the victory at Bajo Palacé his unit returned to Santa Fe.

In 1812, still under the command of Baraya, he was dispatched to the north of the country to fight royalist forces from Venezuela who were threatening the important border city of Cúcuta. However instead of going to Cúcuta the army rebelled against the centralist government of Santa Fe and joined the Federalist government of President Camilo Torres in Tunja. París would see himself fighting in the New Granada Civil War of 1813, and fought at the Battle of San Victorino on January 9, 1813, where he was captured by Antonio Nariño's centralist army when the federalists were defeated in their attempt to take the city.

After San Victorino the centralists and the federalists signed an armistice and agreed to work together as the royalists began to attack the south and north of the country. París now a captain, marched to Cucúta in an army under the overall command of Venezuelan Colonel Simón Bolívar who had come to New Granada to seek assistance for his war of independence war Venezuela. Bolívar had been given a commission by congress of the United Provinces of New Granada and made a colonel in their army and had just defeated the Royalist Guerrillas in the Magdalena River region. With these guerrillas largely defeated by 1813, Bolívar then took this army to invade Venezuela starting his Admirable campaign. París participated in the initial stages of this campaign fighting at the Battle of Angostura La Grita as the aide-de-camp of Colonel Manuel Castillo Rada, however Castillo Rada disagreed with Bolivar taking the New Granadan army into Venezuela and withdrew his forces from the campaign in protest, taking with him París.

=== Southern Campaign ===
París was then assigned to the Southern Army under the command of General Antonio Nariño in his Southern Campaign in an effort to push the royalists out of the southern cities of Popayán and Pasto which they had recently captured. This army left Santa Fe in June 1813, París fought with distinction at the battles of Alto Palacé (December 30), Calibio (January 15, 1814), Juanambú (April 1814) and Tacines (May 9, 1814). These battles were all victories for the patriots allowing them to push back the royalists to Pasto. In their final push to reach Pasto the patriots were harassed by royalist guerillas during their march, and during one of these combats París was wounded but continued on.

After their victory at Tacines on May 9, the Patriots at the gates of Pasto were attacked by the Royalist regulars and guerrillas on May 10 at the Battle of Ejidos de Pasto. During the confusion of the battle General Nariño's horse was shot out from under him and collapsed, partially trapping him, royalist soldiers noticed this and ran towards him to attack, Nariño unable to free his legs pulled out his two pistols and fired at his attackers, Captain París and his men rushed to their commander's side and attacked his assailants saving his life. Despite this heroic effort the battle was a complete defeat for the patriots and in the confusion Nariño was captured and later extradited to Spain and imprisoned there until 1820. París managed to escape the disaster and join up with what remained of the army now under the command of Colonel José María Cabal.

París also fought at the Battle of the Palo Riveron July 5, 1815 where he was wounded in the important patriot victory that allowed them to recapture Popayán from Spanish forces.

In 1816, during the Spanish Reconquest of New Granada he was the commander of an infantry battalion based in Popayán, his battalion would fight in the Battle of Cuchilla del Tambo however the outnumbered patriot army was defeated decisively by Brigadier Juan de Sámano's troops, marking the end of the first republic. During the battle he was wounded once again in the shoulder but managed to escape capture. París was then able to meet up with a group of people that had also escaped capture, they tried desperately to find some way to escape the Spanish encirclement of the area but we're ultimately captured. París now a prisoner, was taken by his captors to Popayán now under Spanish control and imprisoned alongside his fellow patriot officers. The prisoners were then informed by the Spanish commander that they would be quintated, they were then forced to pick lots; with white pieces of paper meaning, they would live and, black meaning they would be executed. During the drawing of lots París's friend Mariano Posse shouted to París “Joaquín if you get death and I life then I will switch with you” París drew life and Posse death, Posse was then marched to the gallows and at the last second was spared from execution.

París alongside the other prisoners were transported to Santa Fe and put before a war council presided by Lieutenant General Pablo Morillo commander of all Spanish forces in New Granada and Venezuela. The council spared him of execution but senteneced him to serve a 16-year prison sentence at the prison in Puerto Cabello in Venezuela. In November 1816, he was transported by foot along with other prisoners to Maracaibo in Venezuela, during the long and ardous journey he was chained to Simon Burgos and were frequently abused by their guards. At Maracaibo the prisoners were put on a schooner to be taken to Puerto Cabello, on March 1, 1817, the Spanish schooner was attacked by a French privateer sailing under the Patriot flag, the pirates slaughtered most of the Spanish crew except for París who was still shackled, the french captain then took him and dumped him on the first beach he could find. From there París was able to find transport that took him to Curaçao, once there he tried to find a way to travel to Venezuela and join Bolivar's forces there but with no money he found this impossible. Penniless and starving he attempted to take his life, but spotted a ship just arrived from Europe and recognized one of its passengers, Manuel Antonio Arrubula, who he knew and the two recognized each other, Arrubula assisted París giving him some money to buy clothing and food. With the money Arrubula gave him he found transport to Cumana in Venezuela where he knew there was a Patriot Army unit there. He then traveled to Guayana in March 1818, and was appointed aide-de-camp to Admiral Luis Brión. Later he would be ordered to Casanare in New Granada under the orders of Brigadier General Francisco de Paula Santander where he would be part of the combined New Granadan and Venezuelan army that was being formed by Santander for a future military campaign to liberate New Granada under the command of Simon Bolívar.

=== Campaign to Liberate New Granada ===
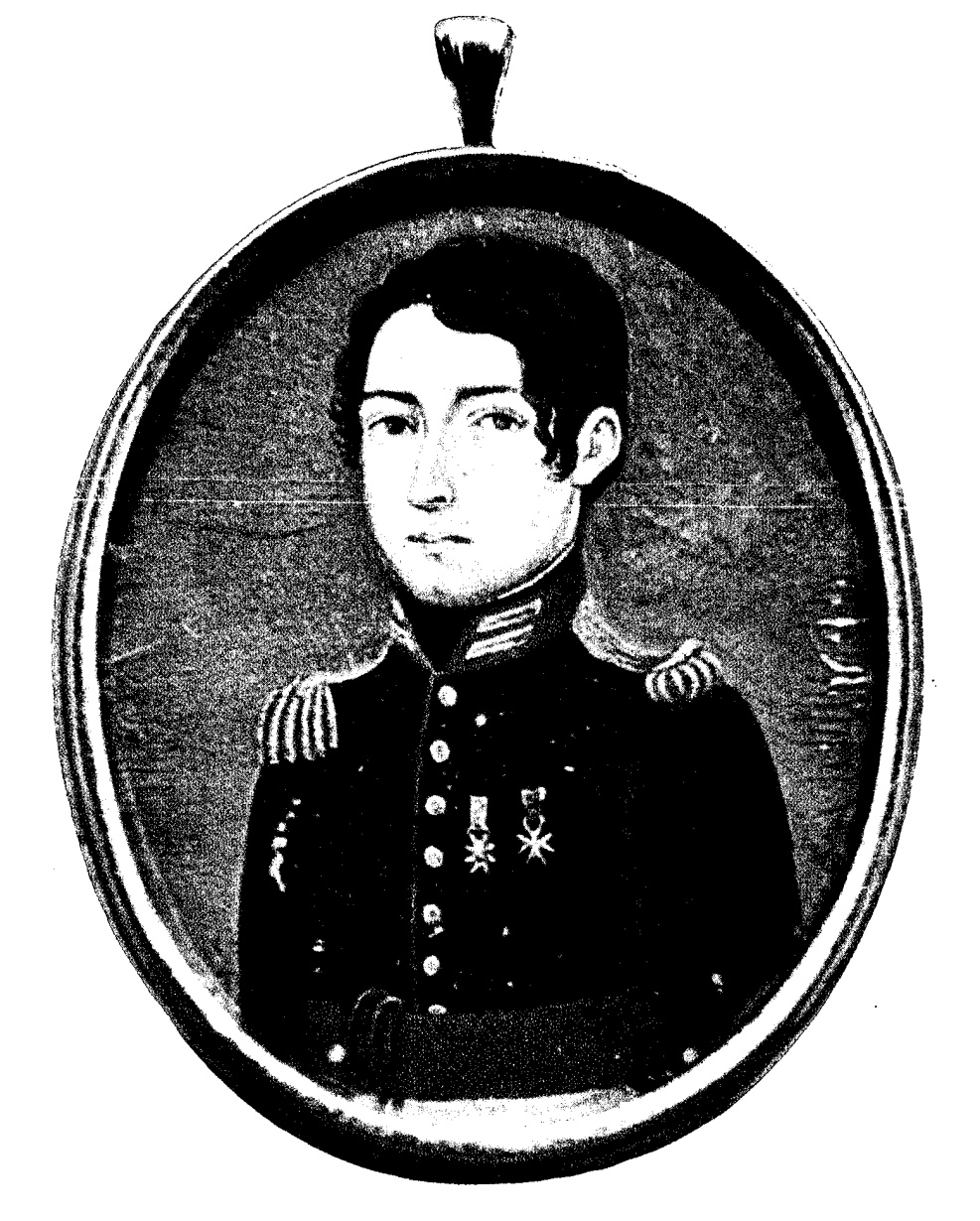
Miniature painted circa 1820, depicting a young París as Lieutenant Colonel.

When Brigadier General Francisco de Paula Santander, was dispatched by Bolívar to the Casanare region to build and train an army for a military operation to liberate New Granada from Spanish control, Joaquín now a Sergeant Major joined Santander. Upon arriving to Casanare he became Santander's right-hand man with the training of these new troops and the two built an excellent working relationship and as a result became close friends.

His proven courage earned him the assignment of very risky reconnaissance missions to gather intelligence on the other side of the Andes mountain range shortly before the start of the campaign. When the campaign started he was assigned to the Vanguard Division of the Patriot Army under the command of Santander as second in command of the Cazadores Constantes de la Nueva Granada Battalion under Colonel Antonio Arredondo Martínez. He fought valiantly at the Battle of Paya on June 27, which allowed the Patriot army to continue their march to the Andes.

After crossing the Paramo de Pisba in July 1819, his battalion took part in some of the first battles against the Royalist Army of Colonel José María Barreiro. On July 11 he took part in the Battle of Gameza, the Cazadores battalion were positioned at the front of the Patriot effort to take the Gámeza bridge and took the brunt of the Spanish musket fire which resulted in many losses suffered by his battalion, which included its commanding officer Colonel Arredondo who was mortally wounded. Arredondo died 2 days later and was buried in the town of Tasco on July 15, París for his actions during the battle was promoted to Lieutenant Colonel and assumed command of the Cazadores Battalion on July 15. París led his battalion valiantly at the Battle of Vargas Swamp where they were positioned on the left flank of the Patriot effort with the objective of taking Picacho hill, his unit tried 3 times to take the hill and was pushed back by the King's 1st battalion, they would finally take the hill through a bayonet charge supported by Colonel James Rooke's British Legion. At the Battle of Boyacá he led his battalion in a charge across the Boyacá bridge to defeat the Spanish vanguard force.

=== After Boyacá ===
He was named governor of the province of Neiva and would later rejoin the army and fought in the Battle of Bomboná. In 1823 he was promoted to Colonel and in 1827 to "General". He remained in active service until June 1832.

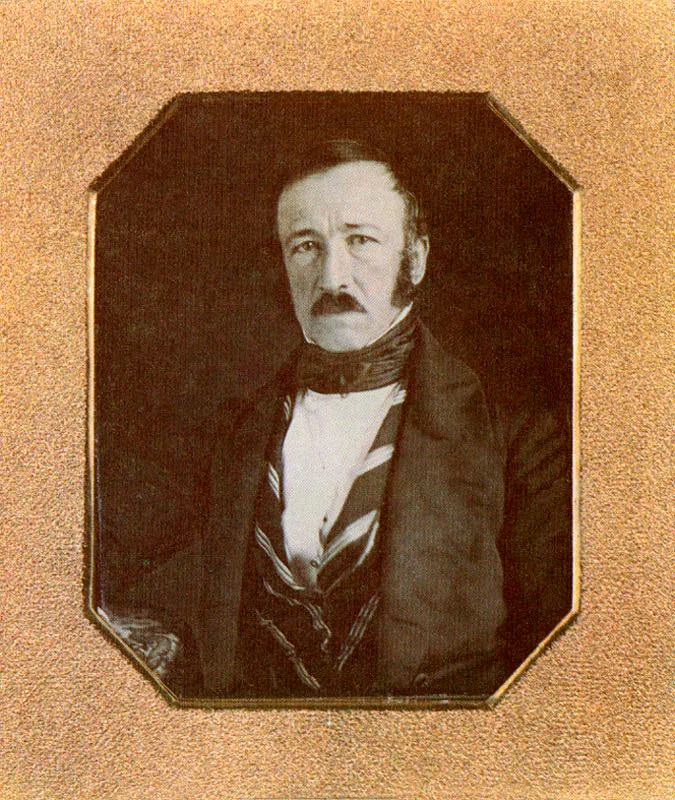
Daguerreotype of París in civilian dress taken around 1855.

He participated valiantly during the civil war of 1840, and in 1841 he served as Secretary of War. In 1854 he took up arms against the dictatorship of José Maria Melo.

In 1860 is wife died, after the death of his wife París sought to retire to his hacienda near Honda however, with the outbreak of the Colombian Civil War (1860–1862) he was once again named commander-in-chief of the army by President Mariano Ospina Rodríguez. During the war General París's health began to decline and he was bed ridden at times, after the Central government lost the war París went to the British Embassy and requested asylum he eventually left the embassy and returned home when General Tomás Cipriano de Mosquera offered him guarantees for his safety.

== Later life ==
París died in Honda in 1868 at the age of 73, when the news reached Bogotá, President Santos Gutiérrez issued a decree of honors in his memory for his long and faithful service to the republic. Seven years after his death and his remains were taken from Honda to Bogotá in 1875 to be deposited in a small mausoleum in the Central Cemetery of Bogotá.
