= Tomás de Herrera =

President of New Grenada

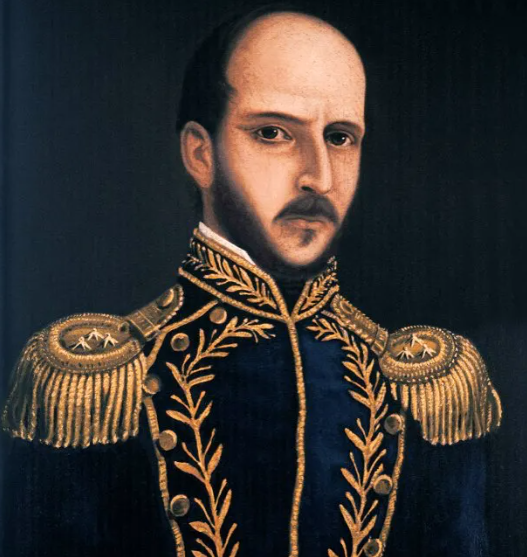
- Posthumous portrait, c. 1880

President of the Free State of the Isthmus*
- In office November 18, 1840 – December 31, 1841

12th President of the Republic of the New Granada
- In office April 21, 1854 – August 5, 1854
- Preceded by: José María Melo
- Succeeded by: José de Obaldía

Personal details
- Born: Tomás José Ramón del Carmen de Herrera y Pérez Dávila; December 21, 1804 Panama City, Viceroyalty of New Granada
- Died: December 1, 1854 (aged 49) Bogotá, Cundinamarca, Republic of New Granada
- Party: Liberal
- Spouse: Ramona de Urriola Obarrio
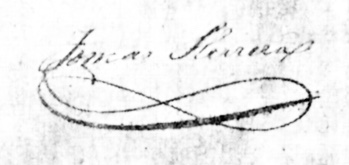
- Signature
- Head of State of Panama during its first, short lived independence between 1840–1841, first addressed as Superior Civil Chief, then Superior Chief of State and later President.

Tomás José Ramón del Carmen de Herrera y Pérez Dávila (21 December 1804 – 5 December 1854) was a Neogranadine statesman and general who in 1840 became Head of State of the Free State of the Isthmus, a short lived independent state which is located in what is now Panama. Tomás de Herrera also became acting President of the Republic of the New Granada for 3 months during the Colombian Civil War of 1854 against General José María Melo, who had committed a coup on 17 April.

== Youth ==
Herrera was born on December 21, 1804. He entered military service in 1822 and became a lieutenant. He participated in the battles of Junín and Ayacucho against the royalists in Peru. In 1828, he was charged with conspiracy, and jailed in Bogotá. Herrera escaped, was recaptured and sentenced to death, but his sentence was commuted to banishment. Upon completion of sentence, he returned to Panama in 1830 and participated in the fight against Colonel Juan Eligio Alzuru. When Alzuru was shot, Herrera was appointed Colonel Commandant General of the Isthmus of Panama. He fought in the Cauca revolution in 1840, but the isthmus' population did not want to join that conflict. A popular meeting in Panama on Nov. 18, 1840 voted for the separation of Panama from Colombia, under the name of the State of the Isthmus with Colonel Herrera as president. He then organized the economy and obtained that Costa Rica and the United States would recognize the new country. The State of the Isthmus lasted only 13 months. An agreement, which Herrera opposed, reconvened the union between Panama and Colombia, which lasted until 1903.

== Governor of Panama ==
In 1845, Herrera returned to national political life as governor of Panama and later minister of War and Navy of the government of José Hilario López. In 1850, he was appointed governor of the province of Cartagena and that same year he received the grade of general. In 1851 a revolution erupted in the provinces against the Liberal government of President José Hilario López, whereupon the government appointed military commanders to quell the insurgency. In the Colombian Civil War of 1851, Herrera had to confront the governor of Antioquia, Col. Eusebio Borrero, who was defeated and considered General Herrera as a military genius.

== Rise to power ==
Herrera was appointed Presidential Designate of Colombia in 1854 when he was a member of Congress. President José María Obando was ousted by a military coup on April 17 of that year. Vice President José de Obaldía met with Herrera and other characters in the Legation of the United States to try to assume power, offering Herrera the secretariat of war, a nomination that the general refused because it would have deprived him of his congress seat. Days later, Herrera managed to evade military custody by the regime that the Dictator José María Melo had established in Bogota. On April 21, he arrived in Chocontá, where he declared himself exercising executive power as the result of a letter of Obaldía stating that he was not able to form a government.

== Tasks of government ==
Herrera appointed Colonel Anselmo Pineda as Secretary of State responsible for Finances, war and foreign relations. Herrera continued his march and entered on April 23 in Tunja, thanks to the fact that Colonel Reyes Patria had defeated the National guard in the city. Here, he appointed General Manuel Maria Franco as commander of the army and Reyes Patria as commander of the provinces of Tunja and Tundama.
Franco managed to build an army of 2,557 men with second commander General Marcelo Buitrago and chief of staff Colonel Jose Maria Rojas Pinzón. Herrera left with his army from Tunja to Nemocón, a town where he arrived on May 19, and where he had to make one of two decisions: attack the column of Colonel Manuel Jiménez stationed in Zipaquirá, or continue the march to Honda to join to the forces commanded by General Joaquín París Ricaurte.

Herrera took the decision to attack Jimenez, on May 20, 1854, and the resulting Battle of Zipaquirá was a disaster where the constitutional forces were defeated. On the death of Franco, Herrera gave the command of the Army to Gen. Marcelo Buitrago, who, having returned to the starting point of the battle, ensured the departure of the troops towards Tunja, while Herrera had taken the opposite course, to continue with the original plan.

With the support of the army of Arboleda, Herrera recomposed the government by appointing Ramon Mateus as secretary of war and foreign affairs and Pastor Ospina Rodriguez as secretary of the interior and finance. They departed with a battalion to join Joaquín París Ricaurte but did not succeed and subsequently sought to reach Ambalema by San Juan de Rioseco.

At the port, Herrera named Tomás Cipriano de Mosquera as commander of Mompós, Panamam, and Costa, and sent instructions to the governors. Then he left for El Guamo where he was joined by Gen. Lopez and the governor of Cauca. Herrera was finally able to get to Ibagué and install the executive branch, where he issued decrees which called on lawmakers to start meetings on July 20 in Bogota.

On July 15, Herrera rebuilt his cabinet, leaving Pastor Ospina in government, Jose Maria Soto Plata in Treasury, Ramon Mateus in Foreign Affairs and Pedro Alcantara Herran in War. On July 20, 23 congressmen were in Ibagué, which did not allow Congress to meet due to lack of quorum.

== Return to the ranks and death ==
On August 5 José de Obaldía assumed executive authority as President, appointing Herrera second in command of the army in the North. On September 28, he was at Piedecuesta in command of his troops, when he received the visit of General Mosquera, commander in chief of the army. On September 25 they succeeded in crossing the river Chicamocha. On December 2 they reached the outskirts of Bogotá in company of the column commanded by General Camilo Mendoza. On December 4, 1854, after the attack deployed by the army on the southern side of the city of Bogotá, Herrera went into action in command of two battalions but he was seriously injured on the corner of the Pamplona and Bárbula avenues, and died shortly after.

== Legacy ==
Despite having spent most of his career in present-day Colombia, several statues have been built in honor of Tomás Herrera in Panama in recognition of what he did. Also in the Casco Viejo of Panama there is a plaza called "Plaza Herrera". This plaza did not exist in Spanish colonial times. In 1781 there was a fire that destroyed the buildings in the neighborhood, opening up the area to give the appearance of a plaza. Originally it was called Plaza del Triunfo and was used for bullfights. In 1887 it became Plaza Herrera and in 1928 the equestrian statue dedicated to the great hero of Ayacucho, Tomás Herrera, was inaugurated. This statue was created by the French sculptor Auguste Denis and was brought from France. At its base there is a glass (the original was stolen in 2008) with soil from the field in Ayacucho where the Panamanian hero received the rank of captain.

== Bibliography ==
- Biography at the site of the Luis Angel Arango Library.
- Life of General Tomas Herrera - Ricardo J. Alfaro (1999).
