= Battle of Bucaramanga (1854) =

The Battle of Bucaramanga was a military action of the Colombian Civil War of 1854, a conflict between the Republic of New Granada and the insurgents of José María Melo. It was held on July 12, 1854, in the city of Bucaramanga, Santander Department, Colombia. On the night of July 10 the commander Clímaco Rincón left with 90 men for Bucaramanga, in order to attack Martiniano Collazos, after his alliance with the rebel Colonel Dámaso Girón was proven.

After failed negiotiations for a peaceful surrender, Commander Rincón ordered the assault on the barracks. After a heated exchange of gunfire, the barracks were overrun and Martiniano Collazos was killed. The remaining 90 rebels were taken prisoner.
