= War of the Supremes =

1839–42 civil conflict in the Republic of New Granada

- Part of the Colombian Civil Wars
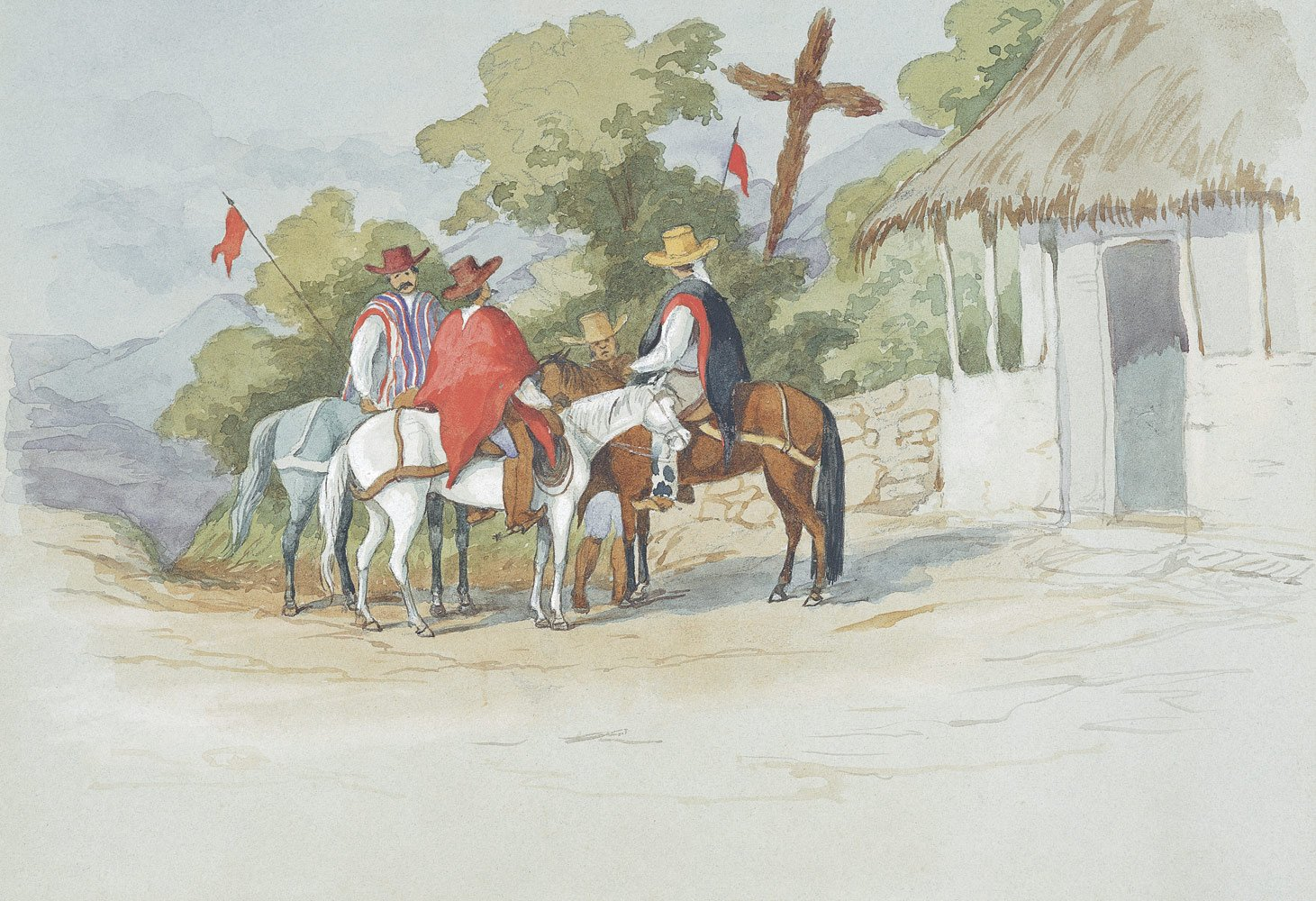
- New Granadan militias near Bogotá in 1843, a year after the war
Date	June 30, 1839 – January 29, 1842
Location	Republic of New Granada
Result	Government victory

Belligerents
New Granada; Ecuador	Supremes

Commanders and leaders
José Ignacio de Márquez; Juan José Neira †; Pedro Alcántara Herrán; Tomás Cipriano de Mosquera; Eusebio Borrero y Costa; Juan José Flores	José María Obando; Vicente Vanegas †; José María Vezga Santofimio †; José María Tadeo Galindo †; Manuel González Valencia; Juan José Reyes Patria; Salvador Córdova †; Francisco Javier Carmona; Santiago Mariño; Juan Antonio Gutiérrez de Piñeres; Tomás Herrera

Strength
5,079 Army of Colombia; 1,184 national militia; 1,500 Ecuadorians approximately	1839: 2,000
- 3,400–4,000 killed between 1840 and 1842.

The War of the Supremes (Spanish: Guerra de los Supremos, also called the Guerra de los Conventos, 'war of the convents') was a civil conflict in Republic of the New Granada (present-day Colombia) from 1839 to 1842 caused by the ambitions of various regional leaders (gamonales) to seize power and depose President José Ignacio de Márquez. It was called the War of the Supremes because of the participation of General José María Obando and other revolutionary gamonales who called themselves jefes supremos ('supreme chiefs').

== Introduction ==
The administrative transformation lived through the Viceroyalty of New Granada brought with it numerous disputes among the American-Born Spaniards over power. Some sought to not lose their high status gained during the Spaniard Empire and other to "take their deserved place" having risen thanks to the power dynamics of the new republican period.

Many provinces were of little importance during the colonial time in terms of military, political, clerical, economic and social standing. However, for the republican era their situation changed vastly. Thus being because of the new type of government that was in place in the territory of Granada which had changed its colony meaning the annexing of an independent colony.

The new republican policy led to the emergence of workers in the new administrative positions, not only within bureaucracy but also in the sphere of defense, as can be seen positions such as Minister of the War or Minister of Interiors were created after independence. This process led to foster the intellectual development of individuals concerned with their region and capable of managing both regional and national administration.

What politics concerned, the new ideologies that were spreading on the country (liberalism and conservatism, to give them a name) had started to define regional patterns of political identity. Merchants and Lawyers aligned with liberal ideas and were open to new opportunities. Meanwhile, conservatives, mostly landowners, priests or military officers favored keeping their traditions and maintaining their earlier governmental and economics customs

== Causes of the war ==
The war began in Pasto, Colombia, after the suppression there of the smaller monasteries. In May 1839 Congress voted to close the monasteries in Pasto and dedicate their income to public education in the province. This was opposed by Ecuador, because the monks there were Ecuadoran.

The population of Pasto was devotedly Catholic. On June 30, 1839, the opponents of the closures revolted, raising the banner of federalism in opposition to the unitary central government. The uprising was supported by General Juan José Flores, president of Ecuador, and by the Catholic Society of Bogotá, formed a year earlier for the political expression of the most conservative sectors of the country.

The opposition Santanderista Party condemned the revolt and offered its services to President Márquez to fight it. They wanted Márquez to name José María Obando to pacify Pasto. They hoped that Obando would gain prestige in the fighting that would aid him in the presidential elections scheduled for the following year.

Nevertheless, the defense of the government was given principally to Generals Pedro Alcántara Herrán and Tomás Cipriano de Mosquera, members of the governing party (Partido Ministerial, or Partido de la Casaca Negra). This party was later renamed the Conservative Party of Colombia. Obando, who was friends with the leaders of the revolt but did not support their actions, then went to Bogotá with the object, it was said, of placing himself under government surveillance to establish his non-complicity.

On August 31, 1839, General Alcántara Herrán defeated the rebels from Pasto at Buesaco. José Eraso, formerly a guerrilla in the service of Obando, was captured. He was famous because Marshal Antonio José de Sucre spent the night before his assassination in Eraso's house. Eraso was now supporting the government forces, but at the same time he was informing the Pasto guerrillas of their movements. According to the official account, when he was exposed as a double agent he thought that his arrest was for his participation in the assassination of Sucre nine years before. He immediately confessed to that crime.

Still according to the official account, Eraso denounced Antonio M. Alvárez, military head of the Pasto forces just defeated by Alcántara Herrán at Buesaco, and General José María Obando in the assassination of Sucre. On the basis of Eraso's declaration, a judge in Pasto ordered the arrest of Obando, the most likely candidate of the opposition party in the upcoming presidential elections.

Obando left Bogotá for Pasto, with the declared intention to face the charges against him. Nevertheless, when he arrived at Popayán he headed a short rebellion against the government. This was ended after a few days by an agreement with Alcántara Herrán, and Obando continued his journey to Pasto.

== The revolt of Obando and Ecuadoran intervention ==
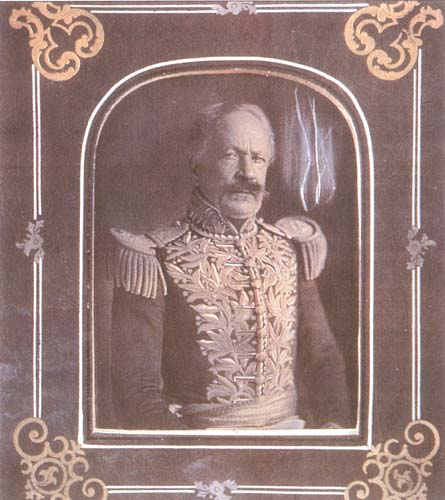
José Maria Obando

It is impossible to say whether the charges were cooked up by the government, or whether they were true. Obando decided to escape from Pasto in July 1840 and to enter into open rebellion.

Fearing a nationwide revolution, Márquez asked Ecuadoran President Juan José Flores for military aid in suppressing the revolt of Obando. Flores agreed, because he wanted to see Obando punished for the assassination of Sucre (Flores had been implicated in the plot himself), because Alcántara Herrán offered the transfer of some Colombian territory to Ecuador, and because Obando by now was calling for the reestablishment of Gran Colombia, including Ecuador, as a federation. Obando also was calling for a revolution in Ecuador against Flores.

The combined forces of Alcántara Herrán and Flores defeated Obando at Huilquipamba. This was a Pyrrhic victory for the government, however, because the opposition now used the Ecuadoran intervention and the promises made to Ecuador as a call for a general uprising against Márquez. They also accused the government of trying to rig the upcoming elections.

== The conflict becomes national ==
One after another the Santanderista leaders in the provinces revolted: Manuel González in Socorro, José María Vezga in Mariquita, Juan José Reyes Patria in Sogamoso and Tunja, Padre Rafael María Vásquez in Vélez, Francisco Farfán in Casanare, Salvador Córdova in Antioquia, Francisco Carmena in Ciénaga and Santa Marta, Juan Antonio Gutiérrez de Piñeres in Cartagena, Lorenzo Hernández in Mompós and Tomás Herrera in Panama. The rebel leaders declared their provinces sovereign states separated from Nueva Granada. They assumed the title of jefes supremos (supreme heads) of their provinces. The revolt had now changed from a religious uprising in a single province to a national conflict over federalism.

The Supremes swore that they would not return to Nueva Granada until the country was organized as a federation. Of the 20 provinces in the country, twelve were now totally controlled by the rebels, and four others were partially occupied by them. Bogotá was firmly in government hands, but was largely unguarded because most of the army was engaged in the Pasto conflict.

Military campaigns in 1839–1840

On September 29, 1840, the same day Obando was defeated at the Battle of Huilquipamba, Reyes Patria and Manuel González, Supremo of El Socorro, defeated the only regular government troops in the central part of the country at La Polonia, near Socorro. This victory increased the prestige of the revolutionary forces, whose ranks swelled. González proclaimed himself the supreme head of the independent state formed by the ex-provinces of Socorro, Tunja, Pamplona, Vélez and Casanare, and went with his army to take Bogotá.

President Márquez left Bogotá to join with Generals Alcántara Herrán and Mosquera, leaving the vice president, General Domingo Caycedo, in charge of the government from October 5, 1840, to November 19, 1840.

González rejected all proposals of compromise. He would have seized the unguarded Bogotá if General Juan José Neira, distinguished in the war of independence, had not rallied the citizens and government forces and defeated González in the Battle of La Culebrera (or Buenavista) in October. Neira was gravely wounded in the battle, and died of his wounds a few months later.

This unexpected victory allowed the return of Márquez, with Alcántara Herrán and Mosquera not far behind. During the week from November 22 to November 28, 1840, called la Gran Semana ('The Great Week') rebel forces again threatened the capital. They advanced as far as Cajicá. Governor Lino de Pombo declared a state of siege and General Francisco Urdaneta, military chief of the garrison, mobilized the entire population for defense.

To raise the spirits of the defenders, a procession was held with the statue of Jesus of Nazareth of San Agustín, the same that had led the forces of Antonio Nariño in the War of Independence. General Neira was carried on the shoulders of distinguished gentlemen and crowned with laurel in the Plaza Mayor, in the middle of an uproarious ovation. Meanwhile, the government's Division of the South approached, under the command of General Alcántara Herrán, and the rebel army retired to the north.

After the defeat of Obando, the only national figure among them, the rebels were unable to unite under a single leader. After their initial successes, this was a major element in their defeat.

== War and foreign intervention ==
The internal wars had many phases and foreign intervention was one of them. In the Supremes War there was many and in different forms. During the early stages of Jose Ignacio Marquez's government Marquez asked Herran to contact the government of Juan Jose Flores of Ecuador, asking for requesting troops to contain the rebellion from Obando on the South. General Flores advanced to Pasto with an Equatorian battalion that, together with the forces of Herran defeated Obando in Hulquipamba. However, this intervention sparked the rebellions in other parts of the country, where other military leaders rose up in unconformity to the government agreement with the Ecuadorians. Some of the military leaders that rose up where Venezuelans residing the country, such as General Santiago Mariño, General Francisco Carmona, Blas Bruzual, Francisco Farfan, Andres Level de Goda y Francisco Carabaño. Then, during the siege that the rebels attempted to do at Cartagena, English war ships were anchored at the bay, protecting the entry of supplies sent by government allies to the besiegers. The end of this wars was possible thanks to the mediation of the plenipotentiary English Minister Robert Steward, who convinced the rebels and the government to sign an armistice. The diplomatic then passed away a couple months after in Bogota due to a malaria contracted during his negotiations.

The war had many supporters not only nationally, but rather, internationally, but just as it had supporters it harbored many situations that wiped all the prosperity and development in the country.
