= Battle of Bucaramanga =

Battle of Bucaramanga may refer to:

- Battle of Bucaramanga (1854)
- Battle of Bucaramanga (1899)
