= Colombian Civil War of 1851 =

- Part of the Colombian Civil Wars
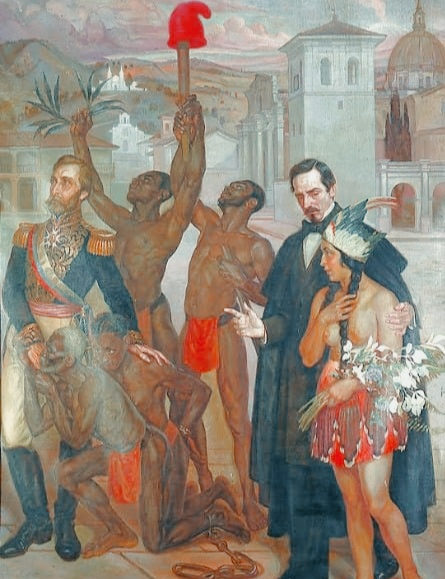
- José Hilario López and the liberation of the slaves by Efraím Martínez
Date	22 May – 10 September 1851
Location	Colombia
Result	Victory for the Liberals

Belligerents
Colombian Conservative Party	Republic of New Granada; Colombian Liberal Party

Commanders and leaders
Julio Arboleda; Mariano Ospina Rodríguez; Eusebio Borrero; Manuel Ibáñez	José Hilario López; José María Obando; Tomás Herrera; José María Melo

The Colombian Civil War of 1851 was a Civil War in the Republic of New Granada (present-day Colombia) between Liberals and Conservatives, fought between May and September 1851. The cause for the war was the abolition of slavery. The war was won by the Liberals.

== Background ==
In the wake of the Liberal Revolutions of 1848 in Europe, the newly created Colombian Liberal Party had won the 1849 Colombian presidential election and José Hilario López had become the first Liberal President of New Granada. His government expelled the Jesuits from the country, supported the separation between church and state, freedom of the press and the federalization of the state, initiated land reforms and abolished slavery.

== Civil war ==
The abolition of slavery provoked an armed reaction by the large landowners in the south, especially inCauca and Pasto provinces. The largest number of slaves were in Cauca and the attacks on the Church were especially sensitive in the extreme south. The rebellion was led by the brothers Sergio and Julio Arboleda Pombo, landowners and powerful slave owners who represented that sector of the population, which saw its wealth threatened by the liberation of the slaves.

President José Hilario López sent General José María Obando to Cauca to quell Julio Arboleda's rebellion, and Tomás Herrera to the Valle del Cauca in the west. The war lasted just four months and its epicenters were in Pasto, Cauca, Cali and Antioquia. It ended with a Conservative defeat.

Julio Arboleda was defeated by General Manuel María Franco in Buesaco (Nariño) and fled to Ecuador, and from there to Peru, when the Liberals came to power in Ecuador.
In the west, Eusebio Borrero had organized an army of eight hundred men and taken Medellín but was defeated by General Tomás Herrera at Rio Negro. In Cundinamarca, the Guasca guerrilleros, led by the brothers Pastor and Mariano Ospina Rodríguez, were defeated by General José María Melo.

== Consequences ==
The triumph of the liberal government in this war accelerated the process of liberal reforms. Likewise, two years later, it allowed the creation of the New Granada Constitution of 1853, which established a wide range of freedoms, but which survived only five years.

== Links ==
- War and Nation. The Colombian Civil War of 1851 by Juan Carlos Jurado Jurado
