= Colombian Civil War =

There have been several civil wars in Colombian history:

- New Granada Civil War (1812–1814)
- War of the Supremes (1839–1841)
- Colombian Civil War of 1851
- Colombian Civil War of 1854
- Colombian Civil War (1860–1862)
- Colombian Civil War of 1876
- Colombian Civil War (1884–1885)
- Colombian Civil War of 1895
- Thousand Days' War (1899–1902)
- La Violencia (1948–1958)
- Colombian conflict (1964–present)

== See also ==
- List of wars involving Colombia
