= José María Melo =

Colombian politician and general

José María Dionisio Melo y Ortiz
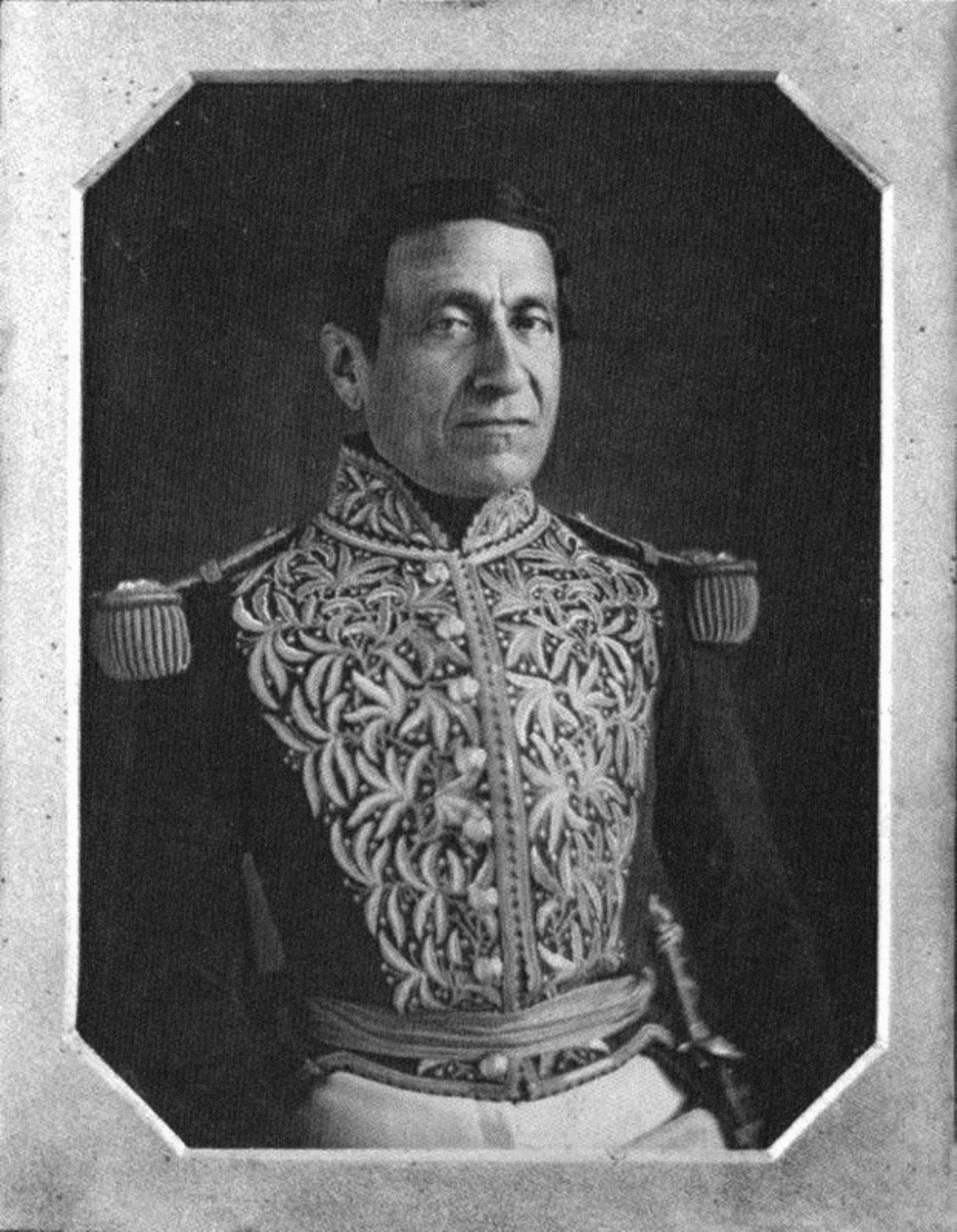
- Daguerreotype, c. 1850

7th President of the Republic of New Granada
- In office April 17, 1854 – December 4, 1854
- Preceded by: José María Obando
- Succeeded by: José de Obaldía (as interim president)

Personal details
- Born: October 9, 1800 Chaparral, Tolima, Viceroyalty of New Granada
- Died: June 1, 1860 (aged 59) La Trinitaria, Chiapas, Mexico
- Party: Liberal (Draconian)
- Spouse(s): Teresa de Vargas París; Juliana Granados

Military service
- Allegiance: Colombia; Central American Alliance; Liberals
- Years of service: 1819–1860
- Rank: General
- Battles/wars: Colombian War of Independence; Campaigns of the South; Ecuadorian War of Independence; Battle of Pichincha; Peruvian War of Independence; Battle of Junín; Battle of Ayacucho; Fall of Callao; Gran Colombia–Peru War; Battle of Tarqui; Revolution of the Reforms; Colombian Civil War of 1851; Colombian Civil War of 1854; Filibuster War; Reform War

José María Dionisio Melo y Ortiz (October 9, 1800 – June 1, 1860) was a Colombian general and political figure who fought in the South American wars of independence, and who rose to power and briefly held the presidency of Colombia in 1854. Of Pijao ancestry, he is considered the country's first and only indigenous president.

Joining the revolutionary army of Simón Bolívar in 1819, Melo distinguished himself in numerous battles of the wars of independence, including the decisive Battle of Ayacucho. During the collapse of Gran Colombia he was exiled to Venezuela. After participating in another failed revolution.

Melo returned to Colombia in 1840 and became involved in the Democratic Societies, reformist political groups made up of middle-class artisans. He supported the presidency of José Hilario López, the first Liberal to take power in the country. Amidst a schism in the Liberal Party and a deteriorating political situation in the capital, Melo took power in a coup d'etat in 1854. He ruled for eight months until he was overthrown by an alliance of Conservatives and rival Liberals.

Once again exiled to Central America, Melo fought against the invasion of Nicaragua by American mercenary William Walker, and pledged his support to Mexican President Benito Juárez at the outset of the Reform War. He was captured by conservative troops in Chiapas in 1860 and executed.

Melo is a controversial figure in Colombian history. After his death, his regime was characterized as an apolitical military dictatorship, and his role in the 19th century struggle between liberals and conservatives was generally minimized or forgotten. In the late 20th century, however, historians began to reexamine his legacy.

== Early life ==
José María Dionisio Melo y Ortiz was born to Manuel Antonio Melo and María Antonia Ortiz in Chaparral, a small town in the Mariquita Province of the Viceroyalty of New Granada, on October 9, 1800. He was raised in Ibagué, the provincial capital.

Melo was of indigenous Pijao ancestry, and is considered the only Colombian president with a strong claim to indigenous ancestry. Some historians have called the extent of this ancestry into question, noting that both his father and mother were listed by the census as "white nobles" who came from important families in the colonial towns of Cartago and Buga, respectively. Others have sought to distinguish Melo's ancestry from his political contemporaries, saying that unlike Bolívar and Santander, Melo was never considered part of the criollo elite.

== Wars of independence ==
Melo joined in the patriot army led by Simón Bolívar on April 21, 1819, commissioned as a lieutenant. The liberation army had crossed into Spanish-controlled New Granada (modern-day Colombia) from Venezuela earlier that year.

Melo distinguished himself as a leader in combat, participating in battles at Popayán, Pitayó and Jenoy. He also fought in the Battle of Bomboná and Pichincha in 1822, securing the independence of Ecuador, as well as Junín, Mataró and Ayacucho in 1824, securing the independence of Peru from the Spanish crown. Melo was also part of the army that besieged the fortress city of Callao in 1825, which ultimately saw the collapse of the last Spanish stronghold in South America.

=== Gran Colombia ===
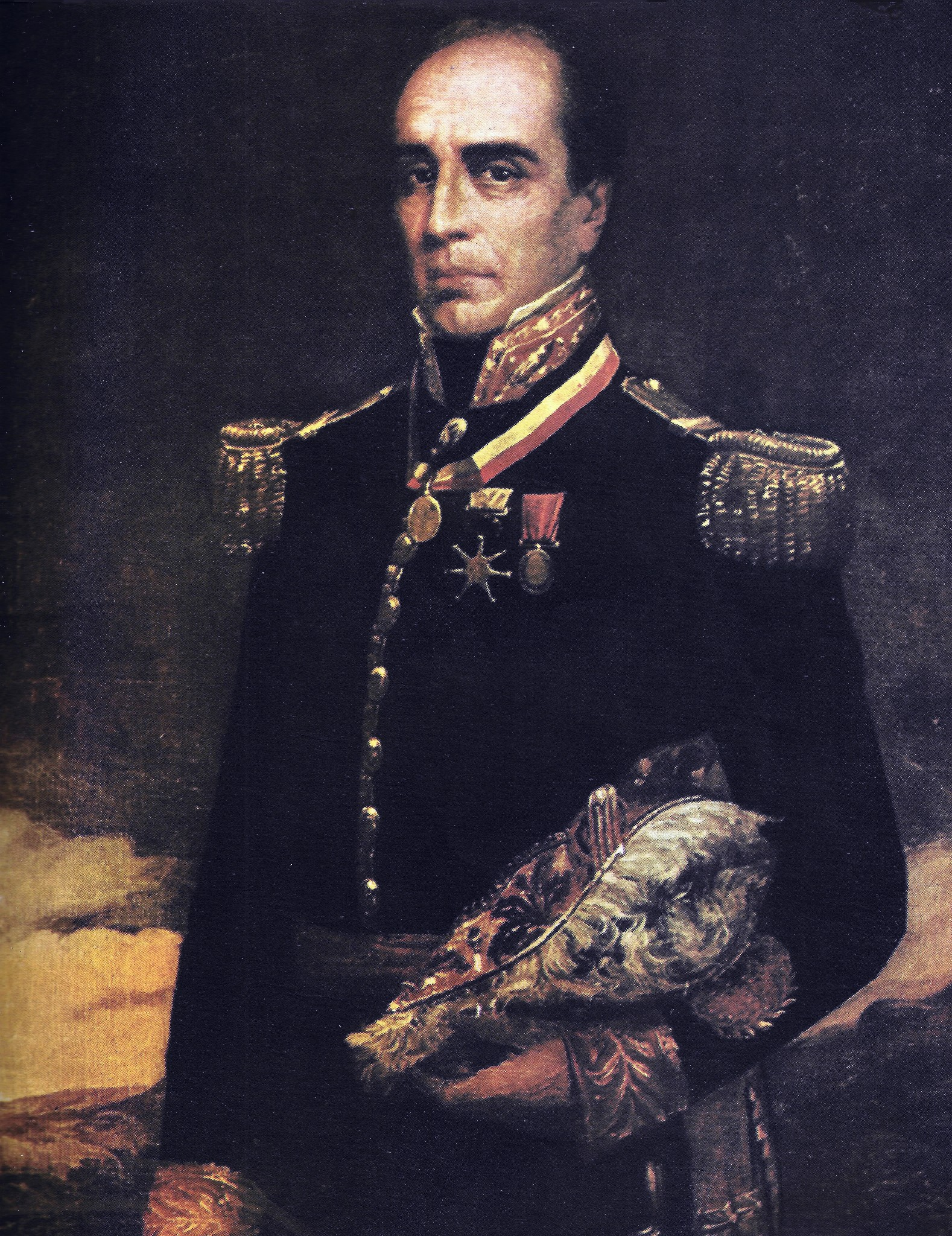
Melo's support of Rafael Urdaneta led to his first exile.

Melo remained with Bolívar's army after the final defeat of the Spanish. He participated in the war between Gran Colombia (which included modern-day Colombia, Venezuela, Ecuador, and Panama) and Peru (which sought to Bolívar's army out of Bolivia). Melo fought in the Battle of Portete de Tarqui in 1829, which ended in stalemate between the Colombian and Peruvian forces.

Though the war with Peru was resolved with the 1830 Treaty of Guayaquil, the political situation in Gran Colombia was rapidly deteriorating. Venezuela and Ecuador withdrew from the union, and Bolívar resigned from the presidency of Colombia in 1830, to be replaced by the conservative Domingo Caycedo as president of the Republic of New Granada. In September 1830, general Rafael Urdaneta overthrew Caycedo and formally requested Bolívar's return. The attempt failed, and Caycedo returned to power. Urdaneta and his supporters, Melo included, were imprisoned in the Castillo San Fernando in Cartagena, before they were deported to Dutch Curaçao in August 1831.

== First exile ==
Melo traveled to Venezuela, settling in Caracas; here he married Urdaneta's sister-in-law, María Teresa Vargas y París. In Caracas, Melo was introduced to a group of military officers that favored the restoration of Gran Colombia, and opposed the separatist, conservative civilian government of José María Vargas. The group also opposed the continued influence of caudillo and former president José Antonio Páez, who was considered a chief ideologue of Venezuela's separation from Gran Colombia.

In 1835, the group, led by revolutionary hero Santiago Mariño, rose up in what became known as the Revolution of the Reforms, demanding the restoration of Gran Colombia as well as various political and social reforms. Though they managed to depose Vargas, Páez raised an army and forced the rebels to evacuate Caracas; the surviving rebels went into exile, some to the Dutch Antilles, and others to Nicaragua.

Melo went to Europe in December 1836. He studied at the Military Academy in Bremen, Lower Saxony, and became interested in socialist ideas debated in local circles. In particular, Melo was drawn to the early utopians, including Charles Fourier and Henri de Saint-Simon, as well as the proto-anarchist ideas of Pierre-Joseph Proudhon and Louis Auguste Blanqui. Melo was also interested in the Chartist movement that emerged in England in 1838, and even the work of French socialist and suffragist Flora Tristan.

== Return to Colombia ==
=== The Democratic Societies ===
Melo returned to Colombia in 1841, after an amnesty offered by President José Ignacio de Márquez during the War of the Supremes. Despite his military training in Germany, he did not rejoin the army and instead settled in Ibagué, where he engaged in several commercial ventures and even taught classes at the Colegio de San Simón. He eventually became a regional political leader.

After returning to Colombia, Melo participated in the foundation of the "Democratic Societies," political clubs that organized artisan workers and liberal intellectuals. The groups drew from the ideas of Saint-Simon, Fourier, and French socialist politician Louis Blanc. They also organized readings of the Bible in Spanish, with radical interpretations reminiscent of 20th century liberation theology.

The artisans also demanded tariffs on imports from industrialized countries like England and the United States, which they argued were detrimental to the development of national industry. They rejected the Mallarino–Bidlack Treaty signed by the administration of Tomás Cipriano de Mosquera, which allowed the U.S. to intervene in Panama, which at the time was a Colombian province, to protect their economic interests.

=== Liberal government and party schism ===
Melo and the Democratic Societies supported the Liberal General José Hilario López in the presidential elections of 1849, which the Liberals managed to win. López's platform encompassed many of the demands of the Democratic Societies, including the abolition of slavery and the separation of church and state; he also pursued issues like land reform and decentralization.

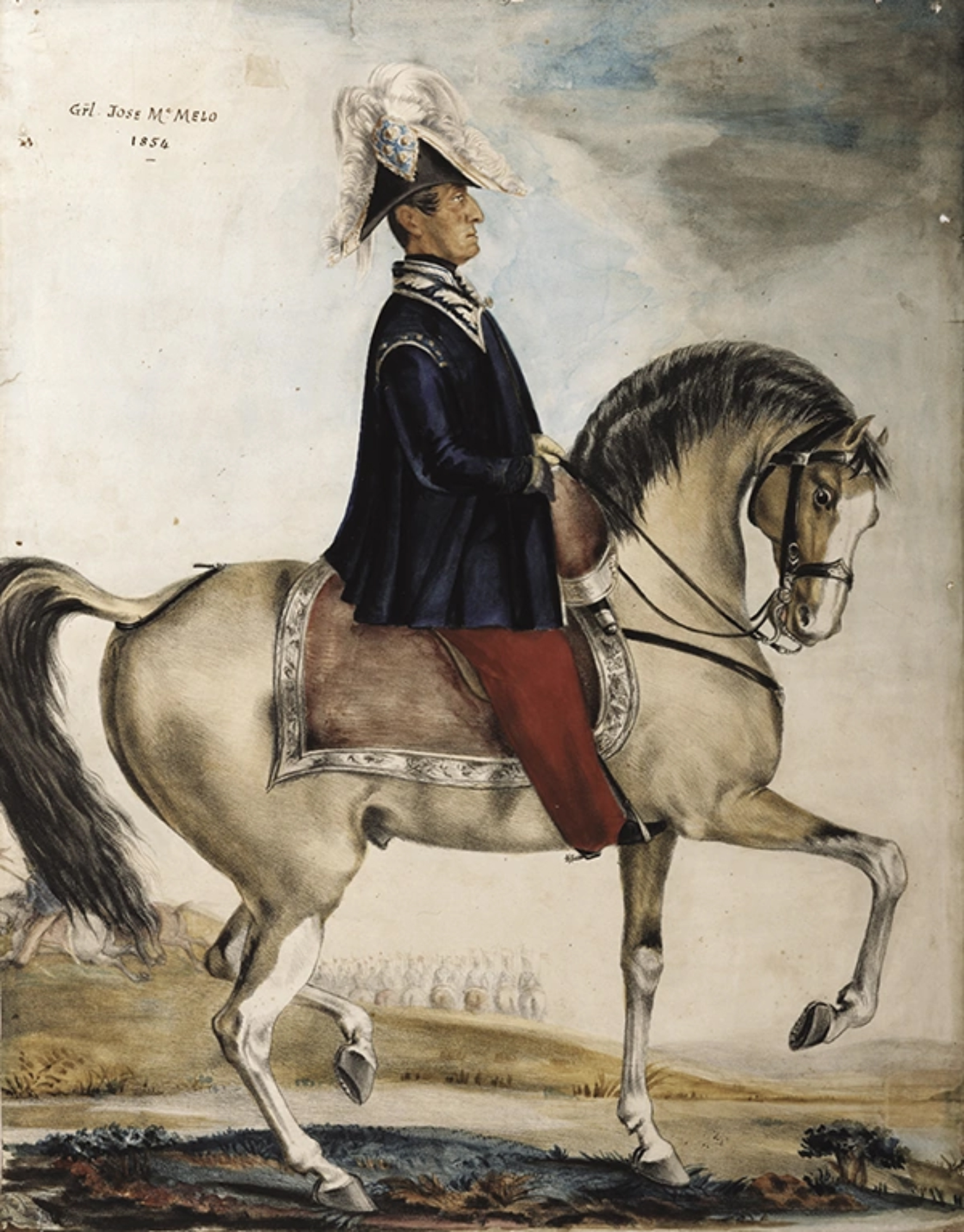
General José María Melo Ortiz

In June 1849, President López appointed Melo, who had rejoined the military in 1847, the commander of the Hussars Cavalry Corps, garrisoned in Bogotá. In this capacity, Melo fought against the insurrection of 1851, where slaveowners and conservatives led by Julio Arboleda Pombo took arms against the López government in protest of the abolition of slavery. He was promoted to the rank of general, and managed to raise a militia of 3,000 volunteers to suppress the rebellion in Cundinamarca, which was being led by Mariano Ospina Rodríguez. Melo managed to defeat the rebels at Guasca, and after the rebellion was suppressed in the rest of the country, was named commander of military forces in Cundinamarca in June 1852.

However, Melo broke with López on the issue of the "resguardos", or indigenous reservations. Melo and the Democratic Societies felt that dissolving the resguardo system, as López proposed, would allow landowners to exploit indigenous as cheap labor for their plantations.

The break was part of a larger schism within the Liberal Party between two factions. The ascendant faction were the Gólgotas, or Golgotha liberals, who espoused a form of bourgeois socialism while holding free trade principles; they included figures like José María Samper and Manuel Murillo Toro. Opposed to them were the Draconianos, or Draconian liberals; this group believed that the republican project could be safeguarded only with a centralized state and a protectionist economy. After the civil war of 1851, Melo and the Democratic Societies began to drift increasingly towards the Draconian camp, particularly due to the artisans' strong opposition to free trade.

In August 1850, the artisans demanded protection and the creation of a national workshop supported by the government.

Melo founded a newspaper, El Orden, in 1852. Though its intended readers were military officers (and it railed against the Golgothas' proposals to reduce garrisons in urban centers), it became closely associated with both the Draconian Liberals and the artisans of the Democratic Societies. The publication attacked both the Conservatives and the Golgothas, accusing them of planning to sell Panama to the United States, and of scheming to exile prominent Draconians like José María Obando.

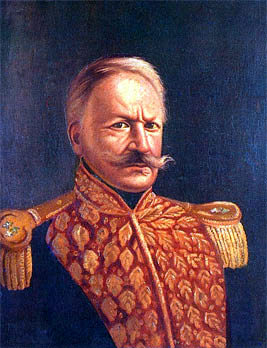
Melo was a supporter of President José María Obando, even though he would later overthrow him.

Obando, representing the Draconians, was elected president in 1853. He promulgated the Constitution of 1853, which was unprecedented in Latin America at the time; it established a federal system, formalized the abolition of slavery, extended near-universal male suffrage, and provided for national elections decided by direct popular vote. Despite the constitution's progressive nature, Obando and the Draconians were not entirely satisfied, aware that the document had been drafted by the Golgothas.

=== Quiroz affair ===
In 1853 and 1854, Liberal Bogotá became fractured between the artisans and the merchant class, especially after a tariff bill failed in the Golgotha-controlled Colombian Senate. The city was facing a severe food shortage, exacerbated by the tax law of 1853. Violent street battles occurred between the two groups, and a coup d'etat against Obando was discussed as a real possibility.

This was the backdrop for the Quiroz affair in March 1854, where various political enemies of Melo accused the general of being responsible for the death of a corporal under his command, Pedro Ramón Quiroz, who was fatally wounded in a street brawl in January. Melo was said to have struck the corporal with his sword after he resisted arrest. In court, Melo produced evidence proving he was at regimental headquarters at the time, and also the deathbed testimony of Quiroz himself, to exonerate himself. However, both the case's judge, Eustaquio Álvarez, and the Mayor of Bogota, Lorenzo González, were political opponents of Melo and sought to discredit this testimony.

As the trial went on in April 1854, the situation in Bogotá continued to deteriorate. Golgothas fought with Draconians in the streets, and armed artisans rallied to the slogan pan, trabajo, o muerte (bread and work, or death). Vice President Obaldía, himself a Golgotha, recommended to President Obando that Melo be discharged from the Army immediately in the name of preventing an insurrection, though Obando declined.

== Eight-month presidency ==
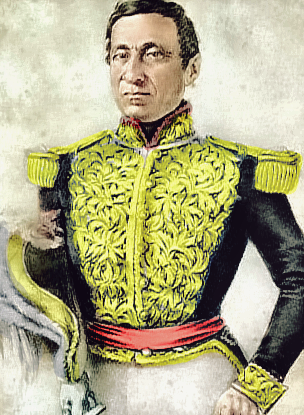
General Melo

On April 17, 1854, mobs of artisans stormed the houses of prominent senators in Bogotá and placed them under arrest. The revolt origins are unclear, but some historians have concluded that it was masterminded by Miguel León, a prominent local blacksmith and president of the local Democratic Society club. Whatever the case, Melo arrived with the artisans at the presidential palace at 7 a.m., urging Obando to dissolve Congress and form an emergency provisional government. Obando refused, and he was placed under arrest.

Melo proclaimed that his government was a rejection of the 1853 constitution and the Golgotha-controlled Congress, which sought to impugn the Army, "illustrious body of armed citizens that gave the people independence." He also declared that "liberty shall not perish as long as I exist." Similar artisans' revolts broke out in Cali and Popayán.

Though the Golgothas and Conservatives, who had fled to Ibagué and formed a provisional government, accused the artisans of forming a "audacious military dictatorship" headed by Melo, the "uncouth soldier", his government enjoyed the strong support of the artisans. One artisan newspaper declared of the new government: "We are free, we are democrats, and we did not abandon our workshops, our homes, and our families, only to give away our sovereignty to one man; we will not, for any price, exchange our title of citizens for that of subjects."

Despite this support, Melo's regeneradores were outnumbered and outmatched by the constitucionalistas, which had united Golgothas like Tomás de Herrera with Conservatives like Julio Arboleda and Tomás Cipriano de Mosquera. Despite victories at Tíquiza and Zipaquirá, Melo's effective control of the country was limited to Bogotá, especially after Cali fell to the constitutionalists without resistance. In a climactic battle south of the capital, San Diego y Las Nieves, Melo's army was decisively defeated and Miguel León, one of the regime's chief ideologues, was killed.

After Melo was militarily defeated, his soldiers and artisans were severely repressed. The only military survivors of the Artisans Revolution were 200 participants, banished on foot to Panama after their property was confiscated. Conservatives in particular regarded the punishment as "an excellent method of purging Bogotá of the democratic pest," in the words of José Manuel Restrepo Vélez.

== Final exile and death ==
Melo was put on trial and was ultimately expelled from the country for a period of eight years. There were some agitating for his execution, but this was avoided thanks to the intervention of certain Golgothas who pushed for clemency, including Manuel Murillo Toro, who paid his bail. He sailed for Costa Rica on October 23, 1855. Though his whereabouts immediately after his exile are unclear, historians believe that he participated in the Central American resistance against the American filibuster William Walker, who sought to create a slave republic in Nicaragua.

After the victory over Walker, Melo worked as an instructor of troops in El Salvador. He briefly moved to Guatemala before falling out with the country's dictator, Rafael Carrera.

Melo crossed the Mexican border on October 10, 1859. At the time, Mexico was engulfed in the War of the Reform, another conflict between liberals (led by Benito Juárez) and conservatives. Melo sought to offer his services to Juárez directly, but was unable to reach the Liberal seat of government in Veracruz due to Conservative activity in Oaxaca; instead he was sworn into the Liberal army by the Governor of Chiapas, Ángel Albino Corzo. Melo was named chief cavalry officer of the Military Department of Comitán, which operated on the Mexico-Guatemala border; he sought out to train his men, most of them Tojolabal Indians, in the art of cavalry warfare.

On June 1, 1860, Melo's cavalry troops, encamped at the Juncaná hacienda in La Trinitaria, were ambushed by the Conservative forces of General Juan Antonio Ortega. After several hours of fighting, the Juarista defense collapsed and the wounded Melo was captured by rebel forces. Ortega ordered Melo to be put to death, and the Colombian general was summarily executed by firing squad.

Melo's position in the Liberal army was taken by José Pantaleón Domínguez, who managed to suppress the Conservative uprising in Chiapas. He was survived by his son, Máximo Melo Granados, who married the daughter of the governor of Chiapas, Ángel Albino Corzo, and remained in Mexico.
