= Buesaco =

Coordinates: 1°23′N 77°10′W

- Municipality and town
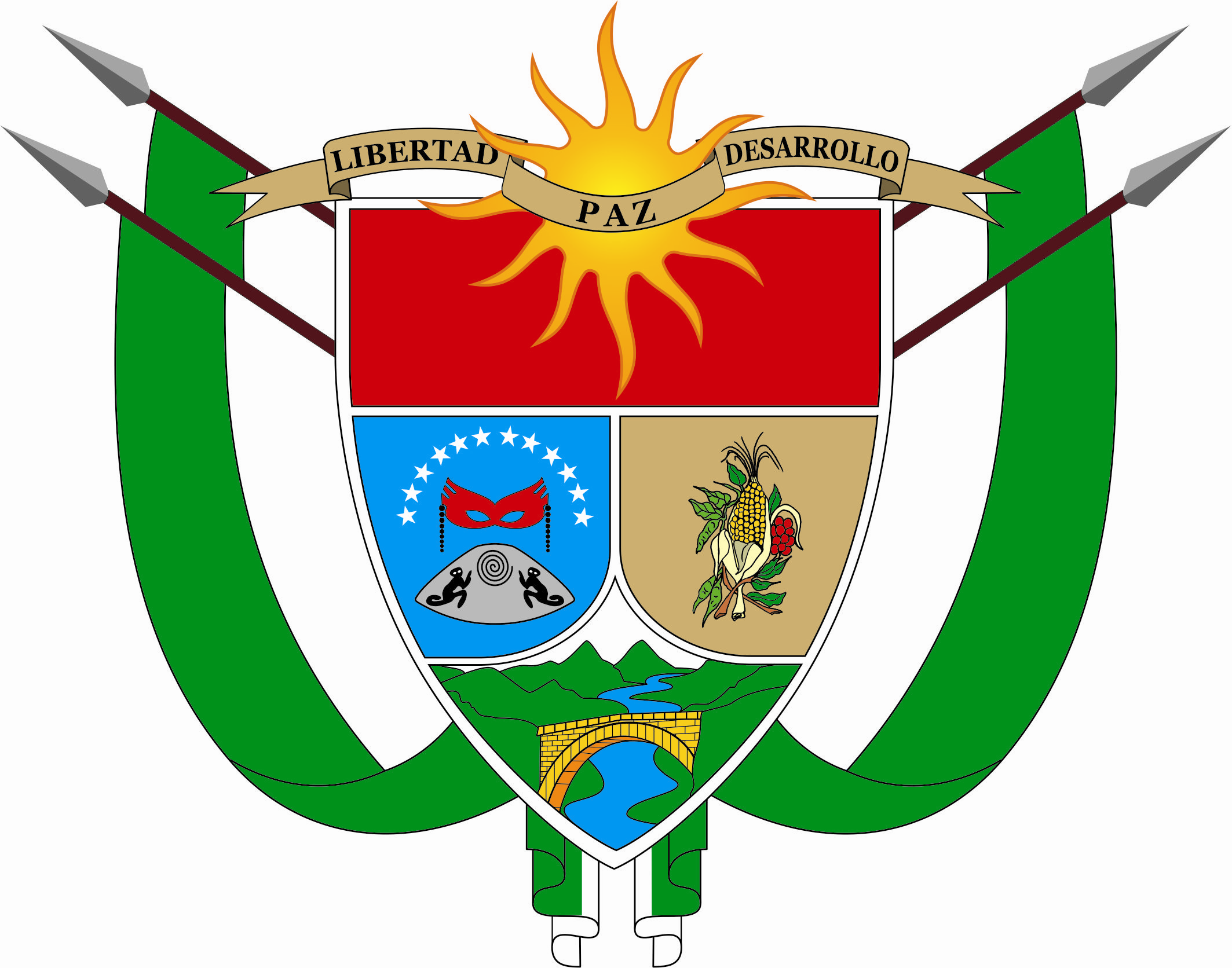
- Flag Coat of arms

- Location of the municipality and town of Buesaco in the Nariño Department of Colombia.
- Country: Colombia
- Department: Nariño Department

Population (Census 2018)
  - Total: 19,951
- Time zone: UTC-5 (Colombia Standard Time)

Buesaco is a town and municipality in the Nariño Department, Colombia.
