= Julio Arboleda Pombo =

Colombian poet, journalist, and politician

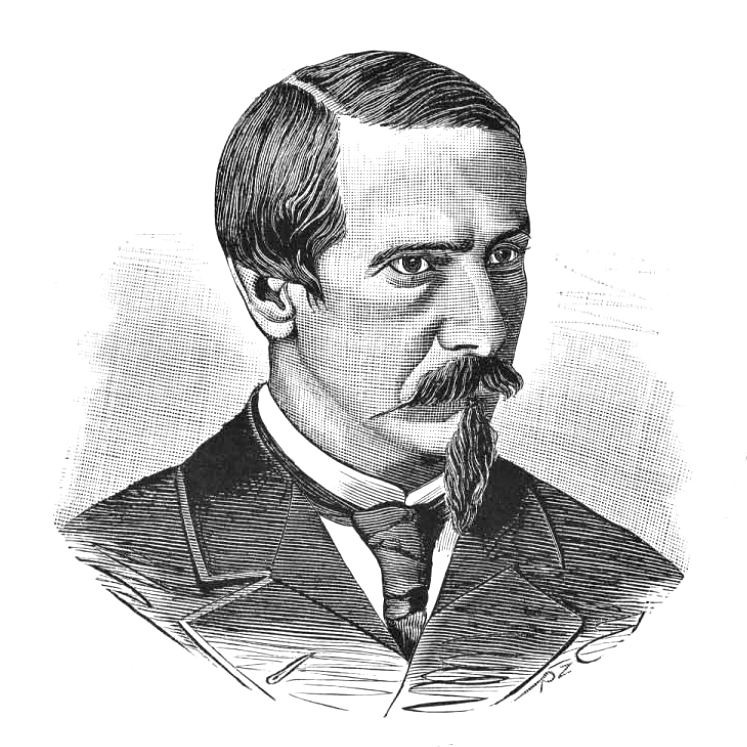
- Born: 9 July 1817; Barbacoas, Viceroyalty of New Granada
- Died: 1862 (aged 44–45)
- Education: University of Cauca
- Occupations: writer and politician
- Writing career
- Genres: poetry journalism

Julio Arboleda Pombo (9 July 1817, Barbacoas, Viceroyalty of New Granada – 1862) was a Colombian poet, journalist, and politician. He was also a prominent slave owner and led a failed rebellion in 1851 with the aim of preventing the abolition of slavery in the country.

== Biography ==
He was educated in Europe and on his return to Colombia engaged in journalism. In the various Colombian revolutions, he was a liberal conservative and more than once declined the vice-presidency of the republic. In 1856, he joined the Conservative revolt in Antioquia, and soon became the leader of his faction. He concluded an alliance with President Moreno, of Ecuador, and made war upon the Federalist dictator, Mosquera. With the support of the states of western Colombia, he assumed supreme power, but soon afterwards was assassinated, by political enemies it is supposed.

== Poetry ==
He wrote in French, English, and Italian, as well as in his own language, Spanish. His poems are much esteemed in Spanish-American literature. Titles include "Dios y la virtud" (God and virtue), "Estoy en la cárcel" (I am in jail), "Me ausento" (I leave), "Te quiero" (I love you) and the long one called "Gonzalo de Oyón" (Gonzalo of Oyón). The manuscript of "Gonzalo de Oyón", called by some his most important work, was almost completely destroyed by an opponent, and only fragmentary copies are preserved. A collection of Arboleda's poetry was republished in New York in 1884.
