= Pedro Alcántara Herrán =

President of the Republic of the New Granada

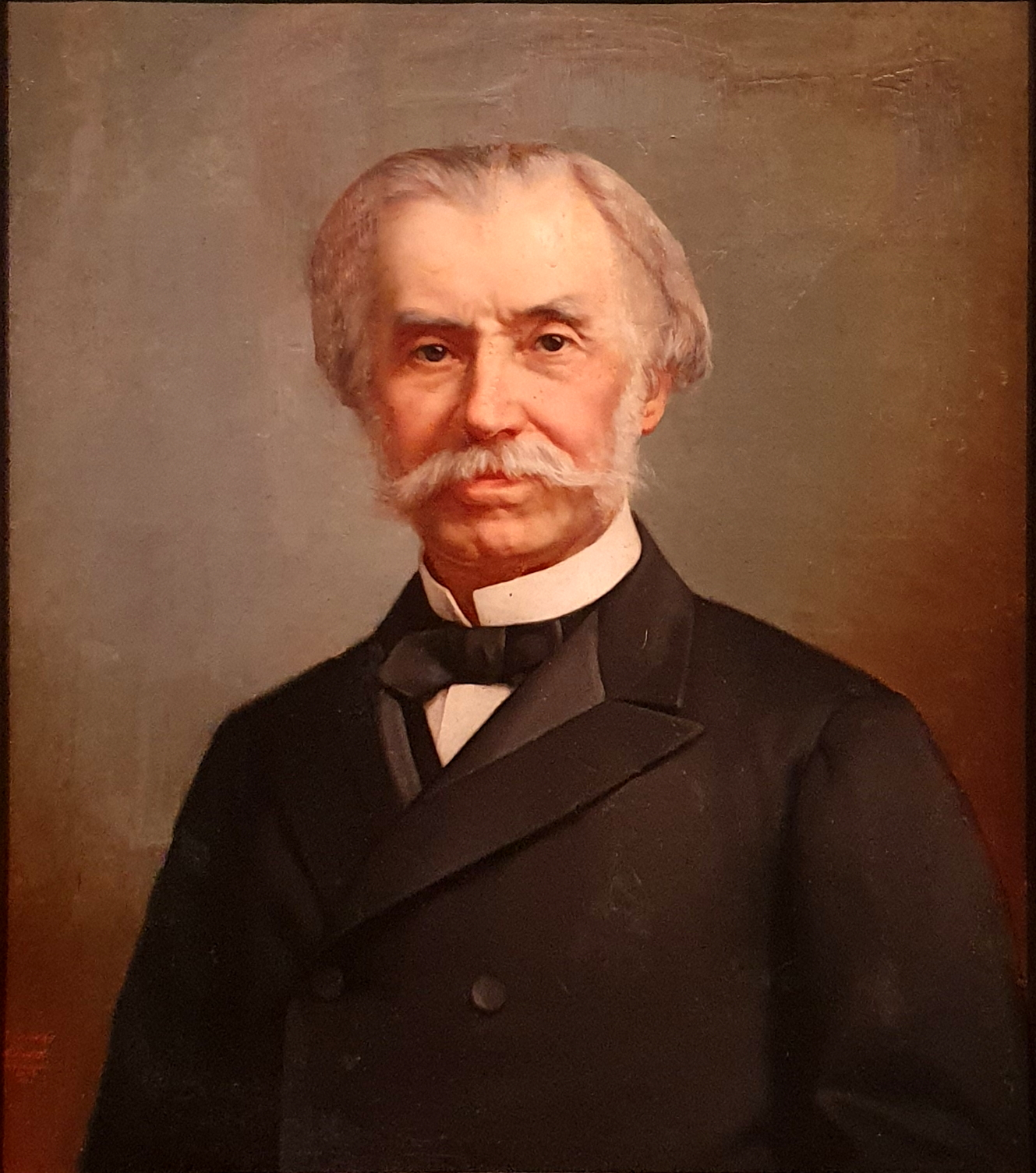

1st Envoy Extraordinary and Minister Plenipotentiary of Colombia to Costa Rica
- In office 1856–1870
- President: Manuel María Mallarino
- Preceded by: Office Created
- Succeeded by: Antonio María Pradilla

2nd Envoy Extraordinary and Minister Plenipotentiary of Colombia to the United States
- In office December 7, 1847 – August 16, 1849
- President: Manuel María Mallarino
- Preceded by: José María Salazar
- Succeeded by: Manuel Murillo Toro
- In office 20 June 1855 – 3 March 1863

3rd President of the Republic of the New Granada
- In office 1 April 1841 – 1 April 1845
- Vice President: Domingo Caycedo
- Preceded by: José Ignacio de Márquez
- Succeeded by: Tomás Cipriano de Mosquera

Personal details
- Born: 19 October 1800 Bogotá, Viceroyalty of the New Granada
- Died: 26 April 1872 (aged 71) Bogotá, Cundinamarca, United States of Colombia
- Party: Conservative
- Spouse: Amelia Mosquera Arboleda

Pedro Alcántara Herrán Martínez de Zaldúa (October 19, 1800 in Bogotá, Viceroyalty of the New Granada - April 26, 1872 in Bogotá) was a Colombian general and statesman who served as President of the Republic of the New Granada between 1841 and 1845. As a general he served in the wars of independence of the New Granada and of Peru.

== Biographic data ==
Herrán was born and died in Bogotá. He was also the son-in-law of Tomás Cipriano de Mosquera.

== Early life ==
Herrán initiated his education in the Colegio Mayor de San Bartolomé in Bogotá, but he dropped out of school at the age of 14 to join the revolutionary army in 1814.

== Military career ==
He enlisted in the revolutionary army of General Simón Bolívar as a teenager. He fought in several battles, and in the Battle of Cuchilla del Tambo he was captured by the Spanish forces. He was court-martialed and sentenced to death by the military court. His death sentence was commuted in exchange for serving in the Spanish Army, which he did for five years. Later, he escaped and rejoined the revolutionary army of General Antonio José de Sucre with the rank of captain.

He joined the armies of the southern campaigns in Nueva Granada and Perú. He fought at the battles of Bomboná (April 7, 1822), Junín (August 6, 1824), and Ayacucho (December 9, 1824). Bolívar promoted him to the rank of General in 1828. Later, he was commissioned as Military Chief of the province of Panama.

In 1839, Herrán defended the government of José Ignacio de Márquez against the revolt of General José María Obando, due to the administration’s closure of the Catholic convents in the city of Pasto. This victory propelled him to the political arena and he was nominated as presidential candidate by Márquez.

== Diplomatic career ==
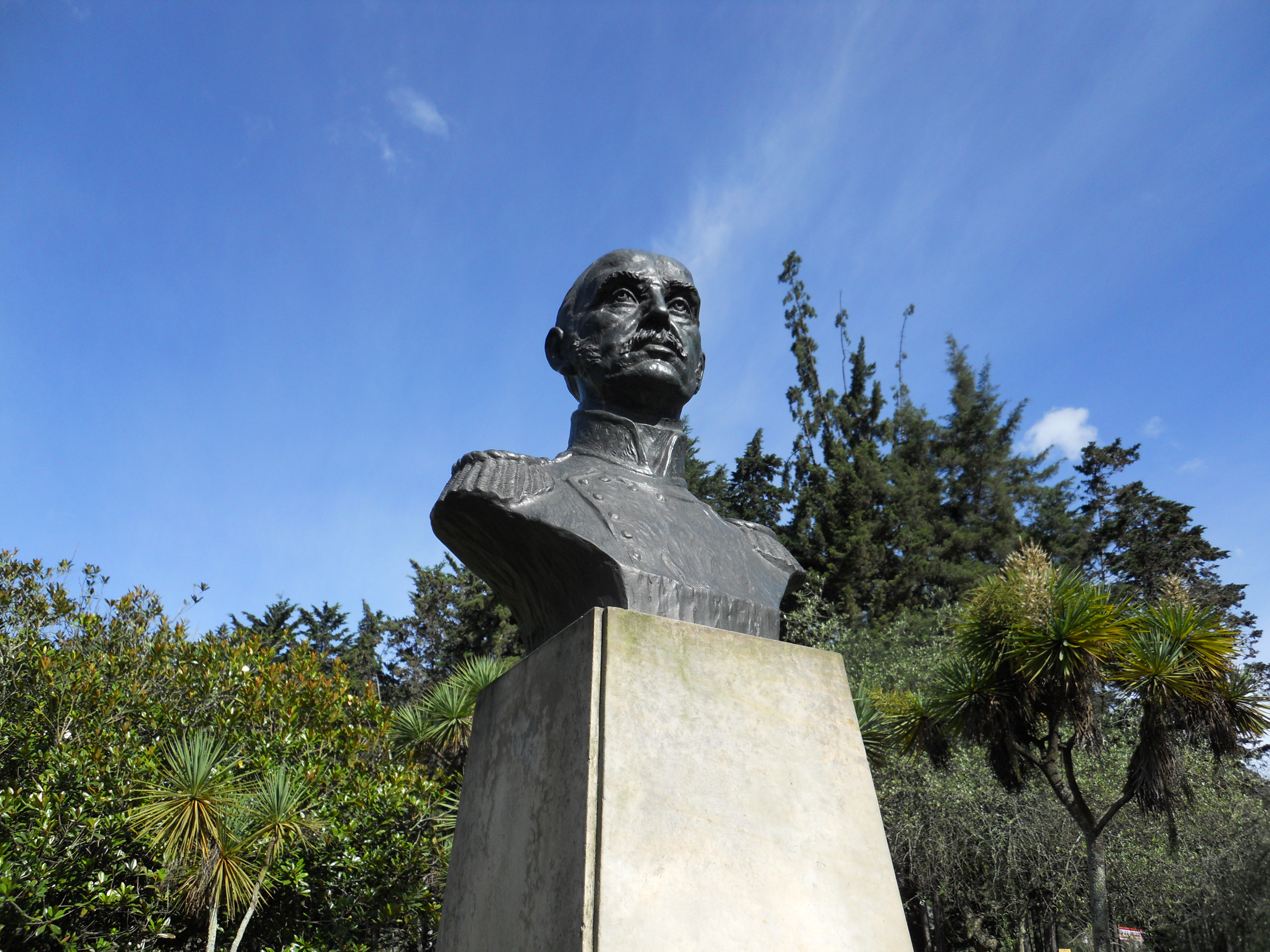
Bust of Herrán in Bogotá

Herrán also served as Envoy Extraordinary and Minister Plenipotentiary to the United States, Ecuador, the Holy See, and Costa Rica.

== Political career ==
As stated above, Herrán was proclaimed as a presidential candidate by President Márquez. He faced two opponents, Eusebio Borrero and Vicente Azuero. However, none of the three obtained a majority of the popular vote, and thus the election of a president was left to Congress . In 1841, Congress elected General Alcántara as president and General Domingo Caycedo as vice-president.

== The Presidency ==
Herrán was elected president by Congress in 1841, for a four-year period, but he was not able to be inaugurated as he was still commanding the government troops in the war against the southern revolt. He was supposed to be inaugurated on April 1, 1841, as provided by the Constitution, but in his place the vice-president Domingo Caycedo was inaugurated. Due to the fact that the civil war that started in 1839 had escalated and spread to the Northern provinces, Herrán commissioned General Caycedo to lead the government troops in the northern campaign. Thus, Juan de Dios Aranzazu, President of the “Consejo de Estado” assumed the presidency from July 5, until October 19, 1841, when Caycedo returned to the presidency. Herrán returned triumphant to Bogotá on May 19, 1842, and is sworn in as president.
