= Tomás Cipriano de Mosquera =

Colombian general and political figure

1st and 4th President of the United States of Colombia
- In office May 22, 1866 – May 12, 1867
- Preceded by: José María Rojas Garrido
- Succeeded by: Joaquín Riascos
- In office May 14, 1863 – April 8, 1864
- Preceded by: Office established
- Succeeded by: Manuel Murillo Toro

3rd President of the Granadine Confederation
- In office July 18, 1861 – February 4, 1863
- Preceded by: Bartolomé Calvo
- Succeeded by: Office abolished

4th President of the Republic of New Granada
- In office April 1, 1845 – April 1, 1849
- Vice President: Rufino Cuervo y Barreto
- Preceded by: Pedro Alcántara Herrán Zaldúa
- Succeeded by: José Hilario López

5th President of the Sovereign State of Cauca
- In office August 15, 1871 – August 1, 1873
- Preceded by: Andrés Cerón Serrano
- Succeeded by: Julián Trujillo Largacha

1st President of the Sovereign State of Cauca
- In office January 1858 – August 15, 1863
- Succeeded by: Eliseo Payán

Personal details
- Born: Tomás Cipriano de Mosquera y Arboleda; September 26, 1798 Popayán, New Granada
- Died: October 7, 1878 (aged 80) Puracé, Cauca, United States of Colombia
- Party: Liberal
- Spouse(s): Mariana Arboleda y Arroyo (1820–1867); María Ignacia Arboleda Arboleda (1872–1878)
- Relations: Joaquín de Mosquera (Brother)
- Occupation: Soldier (General), writer, politician
- Nickname: Mascachochas

Military service
- Allegiance: Granadine Confederation; United States of Colombia
- Rank: General
- Battles/wars: Colombian War of Independence; Battle of Barbacoas (1824) – Victory; War of the Supremes (1839–1842); Battle of Huilquipamba (1840) – Government victory; Military operations against José María Obando (1841); Battle of Tescua (1841) – Government victory; Colombian Civil War of 1854; Campaign against José María Melo; Capture of Bogotá (1854) – Constitutional victory; Colombian Civil War (1860–1862); Battle of Las Guacas (1860) – Victory; Battle of Manizales (1860) – Defeat; Battle of Segovia (1860) – Victory; Battle of La Barrigona (1861) – Victory; Battle of Campo Amalia (1861) – Victory; Battle of Usaquén (1861) – Victory; Capture of Bogotá (1861) – Victory; Ecuadorian–Colombian War (1862–1863); Battle of Cuaspud (1863) – Decisive victory

Tomás Cipriano Ignacio Maria de Mosquera y Figueroa Arboleda Salazar, Prieto de Tovar, Vergara, Silva, Hurtado de Mendoza, Urrutia y Guzmán (September 26, 1798 – October 7, 1878) was a Colombian general, political figure, and slaveholder. He was president of Colombia four times. The first time was as president of Republic of New Granada from 1845 to 1849. During the Colombian Civil War of 1860–1862 he led liberal forces in a civil war against conservative factions. After the liberals won, a new, federalist constitution was implemented, which established a two-year presidency, and the nation renamed the United States of Colombia. Mosquera served twice as president of the new government. From 1861 to 1862 he served in a non-elected, interim manner, while the constitution was written. From 1862 to 1864 he served in an elected manner. He had a fourth term from 1866 to 1867. Due to the liberal reforms carried out under his leadership, he is considered one of the most important persons in Colombian history of the 19th century.

Due to large facial wounds received during a battle in 1824, he required the use of a metal prosthesis in his jaw. This affected his ability to speak, which was marked by blowing and whistling sounds. As a result, Mosquera was derisively nicknamed "Mascachochas" (Gaga-chew) by some of his contemporary critics.

== Personal life ==
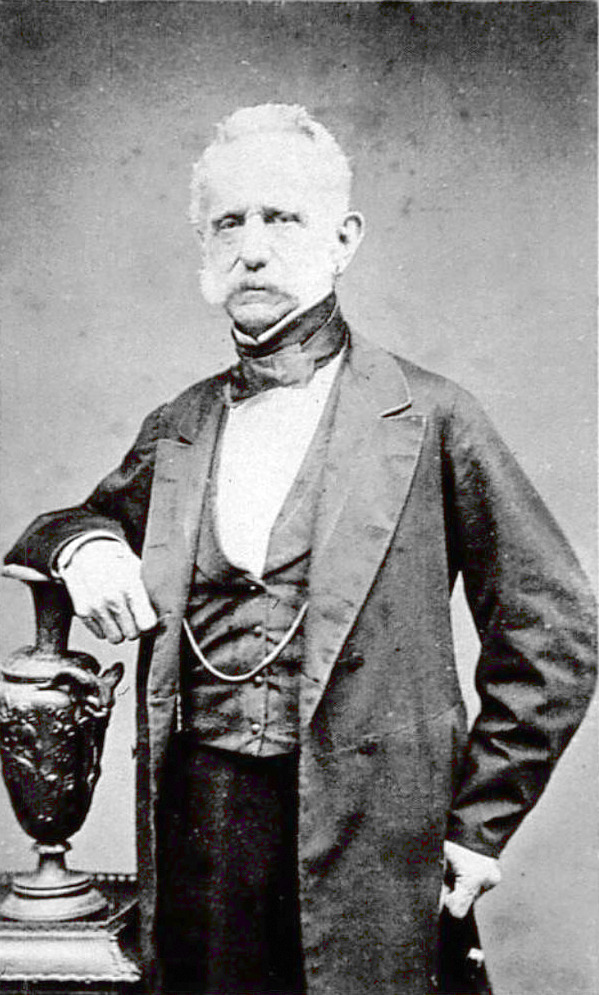
Photograph of Mosquera in civilian attire

Mosquera was born in Popayán, on September 26, 1798. His parents were wealthy farm-owner José María de Mosquera-Figueroa y Arboleda and María Manuela de Arboleda y Arrachea, both from prestigious families. His brother Joaquín was President of Gran Colombia, his brother Manuel José was Archbishop of Bogotá, and his brother Manuel María was a diplomat.

General Tomás Cipriano de Mosquera married twice. As was the custom among bourgeoisie at the time, both times he married maternal relatives. His first marriage was to Mariana Benvenuta Arboleda Arroyo, but it has been characterized as unhappy as a result of the frequent cheating of Mosquera, who had a number of children outside of marriage. When Mariana died, he contracted marriage on 1872 to María Ignacia Arboleda Arboleda. Mosquera was 78 at the time, and reportedly when he proposed to her he said, 'Would you like to be the widow of General Mosquera?' In total he had eight children (with: Mariana Arboleda -Anibal Mosquera and Amalia Mosquera-; María Ignacia Arboleda -José Bolívar Mosquera-; Paula Luque -Clelia Mosquera, Teodulia Mosquera, Isabel Mosquera-; María Lorza -María Engracia Mosquera-; Candelaria Cervantes -Tomás Cervantes Mosquera-).

Mosquera was a self-taught mathematician, historian, and writer, well-versed in Latin, English, French and Italian and wrote different books about philosophy and politics that have academical recognition.

== Military and political career ==
=== Beginnings ===
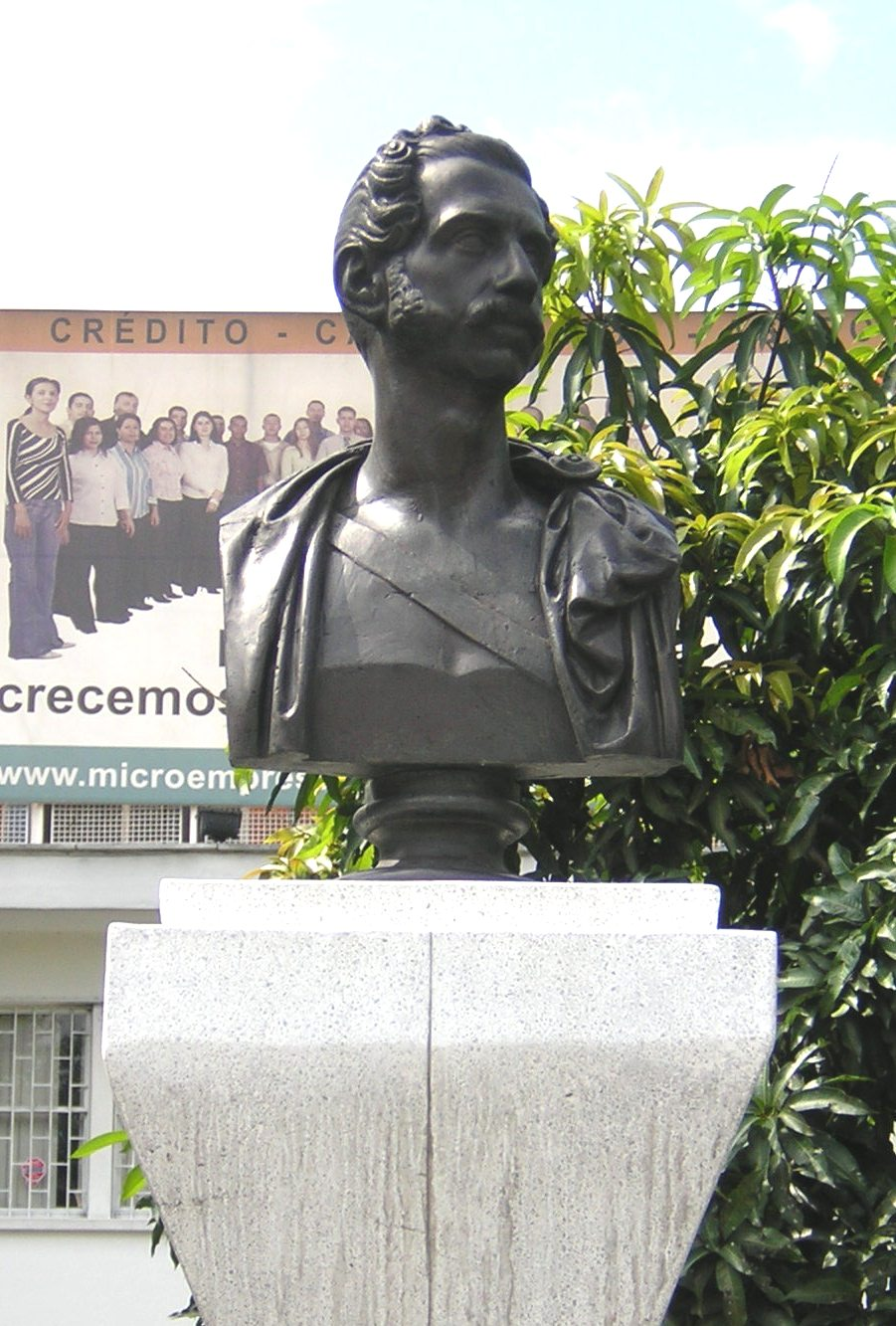
Bust of Tomas Cipriano de Mosquera, in Medellín, Colombia

Already by 1814 he was involved in the independence movement and he was under command of General Simón Bolívar. By 1824 he had already been promoted to Lieutenant Colonel, and in that year he battled the royalist Spanish Army under the command of Lieutenant Colonel Agustín Agualongo, during the Pasto Campaign in Barbacoas, (Nariño). It was in this battle that he received the shot that broke his lower jaw and impaired his speech, and that made him the object of the infamous nickname of "Mascachochas." His prowess in battle was awarded by a promotion to colonel, and he became governor of a number of provinces in the southwest of the country (Buenaventura, Guayaquil, Cauca), at the same time raising among the ranks, and being promoted to general in 1829.

Mosquera was a diplomat in Peru between 1829 and 1830, and subsequently he was a diplomat in various countries in Europe and in the United States (1830–1833). At his return he became a congressman (1834–1837), and later Secretary of War for the conservative government of José Ignacio de Márquez. As secretary of war, Mosquera commanded and was victorious in the War of the Supremes in 1840. He was later sent as ambassador to Peru, Chile and Bolivia, between 1842 and 1845.

=== First presidential term (1845–1849) ===

In 1845, the so-called ministerial sector (who later would form the Conservative Party) supported Mosquera as a candidate for Presidency, and he was victorious. During his administration he emphasized economic opening up. In 1846 his administration signed the Mallarino–Bidlack Treaty with the United States. He also was influential in the suppression of remnant colonial taxes, and reinvigorated the tobacco industry. It was also during his term that the International System of Units was implemented. Mosquera also started political measures to separate the State and Catholic Church. He also hired Thomas Reed to direct the building of Capitolio Nacional. His administration was also first one in the history of the Country to conduct a census. Finally, he promoted steam navigation over the Magdalena River, when he authorized in 1849 that exports could pass by the port of Barranquilla.

His political measures were frowned upon by the sectors that had previously supported him in his presidential election, and he was much closer to liberals. By the end of his term he moved to New York city to devote in his family business, and he created an international trade house in there which went bankrupt. While in New York, he wrote his 'Memoria sobre geografía física y política de Nueva Granada', one of his many treatises in Colombian geography. He was member of a number of scientific societies in Latin America and Europe. He went back to Colombia some years later to fight the so-called Artisans' Revolution, and to defeat the dictatorship of José María Melo in 1854. By then he had fully converted to the liberal party, and as such he was a representative and senator in the Congress, as well as a candidate to presidential reelection in 1857, which he lost to conservative Mariano Ospina Rodríguez. With the creation of Granadine Confederation, Mosquera was elected president of the Cauca State, a position from which he made opposition to president Ospina, to whom he accused of disrespecting the states' autonomy.

=== Civil War 1860–1862 ===
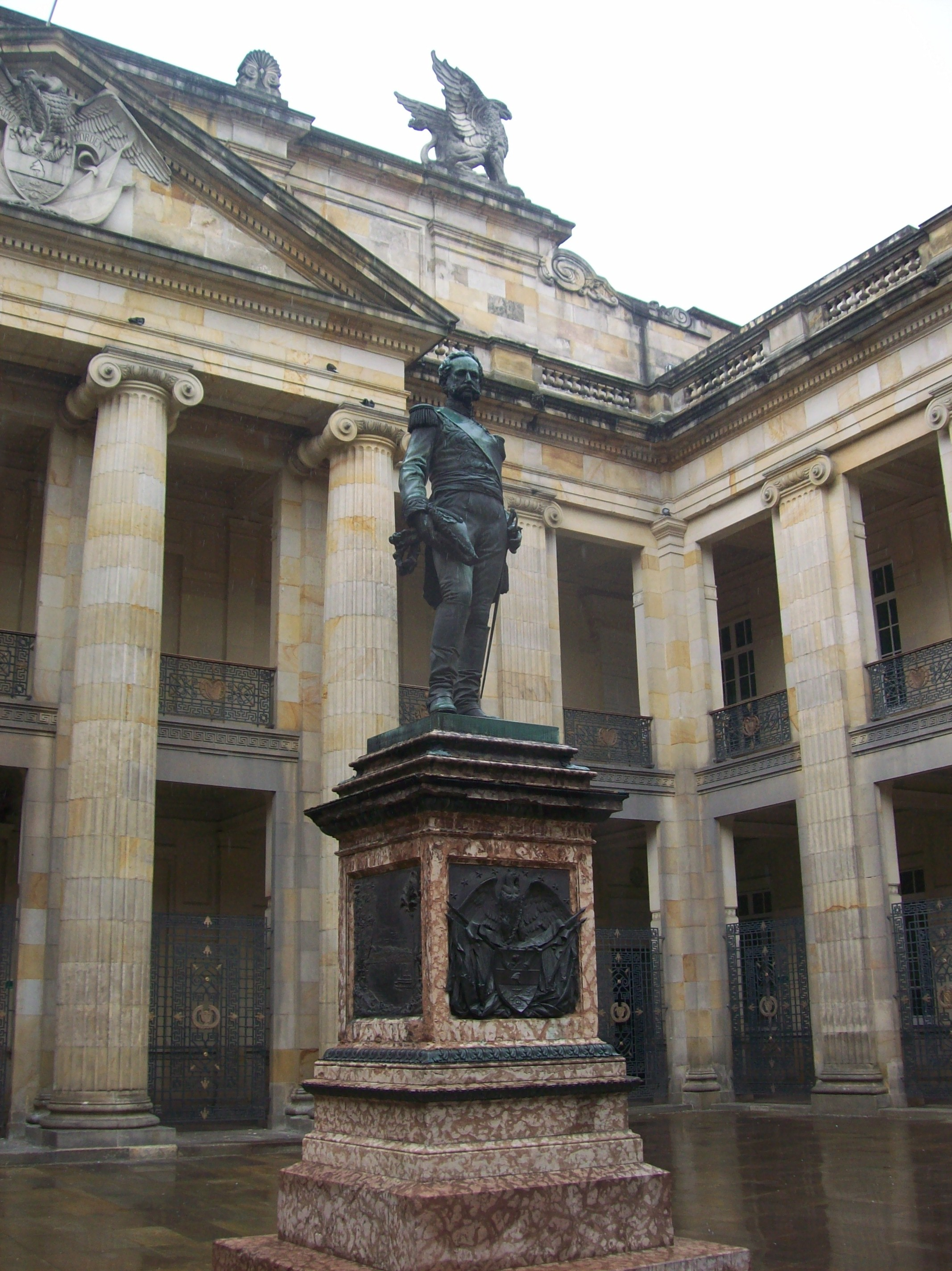
Statue of Tomás Cipriano de Mosquera by Ferdinand von Miller (1883) in the National Capitol in Bogotá.

In 1860 Mosquera declared the secession of the Cauca State and declared war to the Granadine Confederation. He soon received support from the states of Santander and Tolima, which proclaimed him governor. After heavy battles Colombian Civil War, Mosquera was able to seize the power in 1861, after which he promoted the creation of the United States of Colombia.

=== Second and third presidential terms (1861–1864) ===
During his second term as president (1861–1863), Mosquera enacted several decrees aimed to control the power of the Catholic Church, selling many of its properties to invigorate the economy and giving them to the poor Colombian people, and banning Jesuits from the country for their open support for the Conservative faction. Despite some dissent, a federal and liberal constitution was proclaimed that guaranteed rights to citizens. All the signers supported this Constitution. It was decided that Mosquera should complete the first two-year term as President of the United States of Colombia, until April 1864.

Mosquera's third term included war against Ecuador in 1863, and he personally commanded the Colombian army to victory. This would be the only international conflict to date between the two countries. At the end of his term, he traveled to Paris as ambassador to France.

=== Fourth presidential term (1866–1867), retirement and death ===
In 1866 Mosquera went back to Colombia, to be elected President for the fourth time, despite the opposition of radical liberals. Nevertheless, tensions with the Catholic Church led to strong intervention by Pope Pius IX, and his use of dictatorial measures (such as the closing of the ordinary sessions of Congress in 1867) led the opposition to orchestrate a coup d'état on May 23, 1867. His enemies were besides aware that Mosquera was ready to sue corrupted politicians that had taken advantage of the properties that belonged to the Catholic Church and were assigned to the poor ones. He was exiled for the three next years, during which he lived in Lima, where he wrote his book 'Cosmogonía. Estudio sobre los diversos sistemas de la creación del universo' (Cosmogony. A study of the diverse systems of the creation of the universe). Back in Colombia by 1871, he ran for president again but failed, although he was elected to the presidency of Cauca State until 1873. He was a senator again in 1876.

He died October 7, 1878, in his farm Coconuco, in Puracé, close to Popayán. He was buried in the Panteón de los Próceres cemetery in Popayán.

== Works ==
- Vida de Bolívar ("Life of Bolívar," New York, 1853)
- Cosmogonía. Estudio sobre los diversos sistemas de la creación del universo ("Cosmogony. A study of the diverse systems of the creation of the universe," 1868)
- Memoria sobre geografía física y política de la Nueva Granada
