= Republic of New Granada =

1831–1858 state in South America

Coordinates: 4°39′N 74°3′W

Republic of New Granada República de la Nueva Granada (Spanish)
- 1831–1858
- Flag Coat of arms
- Motto: Libertad y Orden (English: Liberty and Order)
- Anthem: Al Veinte De Julio (Spanish) (Note: Reference to the Revolt of July 20)
- Republic of New Granada
- Capital: Santa Fé de Bogotá
- Religion: Roman Catholicism
- Demonyms: New Granadan; Granadine
- Government: Unitary presidential republic
- President
  - 1831: Domingo Caycedo
  - 1832–1837: Francisco de Paula Santander
  - 1857–1858: Mariano Ospina Rodríguez
- History
  - Established: 20 October 1831
  - Bill of rights^{1}: 1853
  - Constitutional Change: 11 April 1858

Area
  - Total: 1,331,250 km^{2} (514,000 sq mi)

Population
  - 1851: 2,243,730
- Currency: Peso
Preceded by	Succeeded by
Gran Colombia	Granadine Confederation
- ^{1} Abolition of slavery, and suffrage to all males over 21.

The Republic of New Granada was a centralist unitary republic consisting primarily of present-day Colombia and Panama with smaller portions of today's Costa Rica, Ecuador, Venezuela, Peru and Brazil that existed from 1831 to 1858. The state was created after the dissolution of Gran Colombia in 1830 through the secession of Ecuador and Venezuela. In 1858, the state was renamed into the Granadine Confederation.

The national flag, with the Gran Colombian colours in Veles' arrangement, was adopted on 9 May 1834 and used until 26 November 1861. The merchant ensign had the eight-pointed star in white.

== History ==
The history of the Republic of New Granada was marked by competing economic and political interests and rocked by violent conflicts and civil wars. One of the prime features of the political climate of the Republic was the position of the Roman Catholic Church and the level of autonomy for the federal states.

In 1839, a dispute arose over the dissolution of monasteries by the Congress of New Granada. This soon escalated into the War of the Supremes, which raged for the next two years and transformed into a conflict about regional autonomy and a border conflict with Ecuador. Panama tried unsuccessfully to break away from New Granada in 1840 and 1850.

In 1851, a civil war was triggered by the Liberal reforms of President José Hilario López, among them the emancipation of slaves, the expulsion of the Jesuits, the granting of freedom of the press and the abolition of the death penalty. In reaction, Conservative and pro-slavery groups from the Cauca and Antioquia departments, led by Julio Arboleda, Manuel Ibánez, and Eusebio Borrero, revolted against President López in an attempt to prevent these reforms.

In 1853, there was a Liberal constitutional reform under President José María Obando; in April 1854 General José María Melo overthrew Obando and proclaimed himself dictator. This triggered another civil war (1854) resulting in Melo's ouster. In 1858, a federal constitution was introduced. An 1860 uprising by General Tomás Cipriano de Mosquera sparked another civil war (1860–1862). After the capture of Bogotá in 1861 by Mosquera, who proclaimed himself president, the country was renamed and given a new constitution to form the Granadine Confederation in response to demands for a decentralized administration for the country.

== Provinces ==
The territory of the republic was divided into provinces. Each province was composed of one or more cantons, each canton was divided into several districts.

From 1855 to 1857, seven states were created out of the provinces.

The Republic also included some territories in the peripheral regions of the country.

== See also ==
- Gran Colombia

== Sources ==
- INSTITUCION EDUCATIVA MUNICIPAL MARCO FIDEL SUAREZ
- UNAM
- Histoire de la Colombie de 1831 à 1861
- Ecured
