= Maynas =

Maynas may refer to:

== Places ==
- Maynas province, in Loreto

=== Historical ===
- Governorate of Maynas, existed from 1619 to 1802
- General Command of Maynas, existed from 1802 to 1822
  - War of Independence of Maynas
- Department of Quijos and Maynas, existed from 1822 to 1825

== Other usees ==
- Maina people
  - Maynas language
