= Territorial evolution of Colombia =

Timeline of the changes in political organization, borders and territorial division of Colombia from 1810 to 2012.

Throughout history, the borders and territorial organization of Colombia have been through various transformations, mainly due to political and demographics criteria, but much less due to cultural factors, among other internal and external factors. Even when the independent governments have at various points tried to organize the territory of the nation in order to achieve a better administration, the general shape of the artificial borders of the subnational entities have followed the outline made during the Spanish conquest and the colonial periods.

Most of the territorial changes were made during the 19th century, the period in which the Colombian War of Independence took place, as well as the most violent civil wars that the country has endured.

== Background ==
The history of the administrative and political organization of Colombia does not begin with the arrival of the Spanish to the New World. Before this, numerous peoples and groups existed, each with their own cultural structures, differing from one another. One of such peoples, and perhaps the most advanced one, that inhabited the Colombian territory was the indigenous Muisca people, who formed one of the most organized societies of the continent in the interior of the country.

In 1508, the first colonial political and administrative subdivisions began to be made, in turn becoming the base for modern Colombia.

The Kingdom of Tierra Firme was created that same year, becoming the first Spanish colonial territorial entity on the continental New World. It covered the northern coastal territories of South America and the southernmost territories of continental Central America, from the Guianas all the way to the Cabo Gracias a Dios, in modern-day Honduras and Nicaragua. This entity was created 16 years after Columbus' landing at Guanahani and 9 years after the moment Alonso de Ojeda landed at Cabo de la Vela, in the Guajira Peninsula, the northernmost point of continental South America.

=== Earliest colonial territorial subdivisions ===
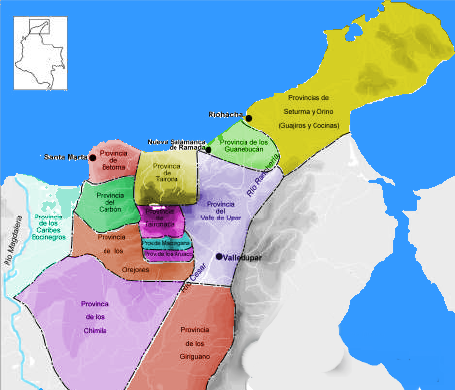
Indigenous territories around 1500. This territories would become part of the Province of Santa Marta around 1526.

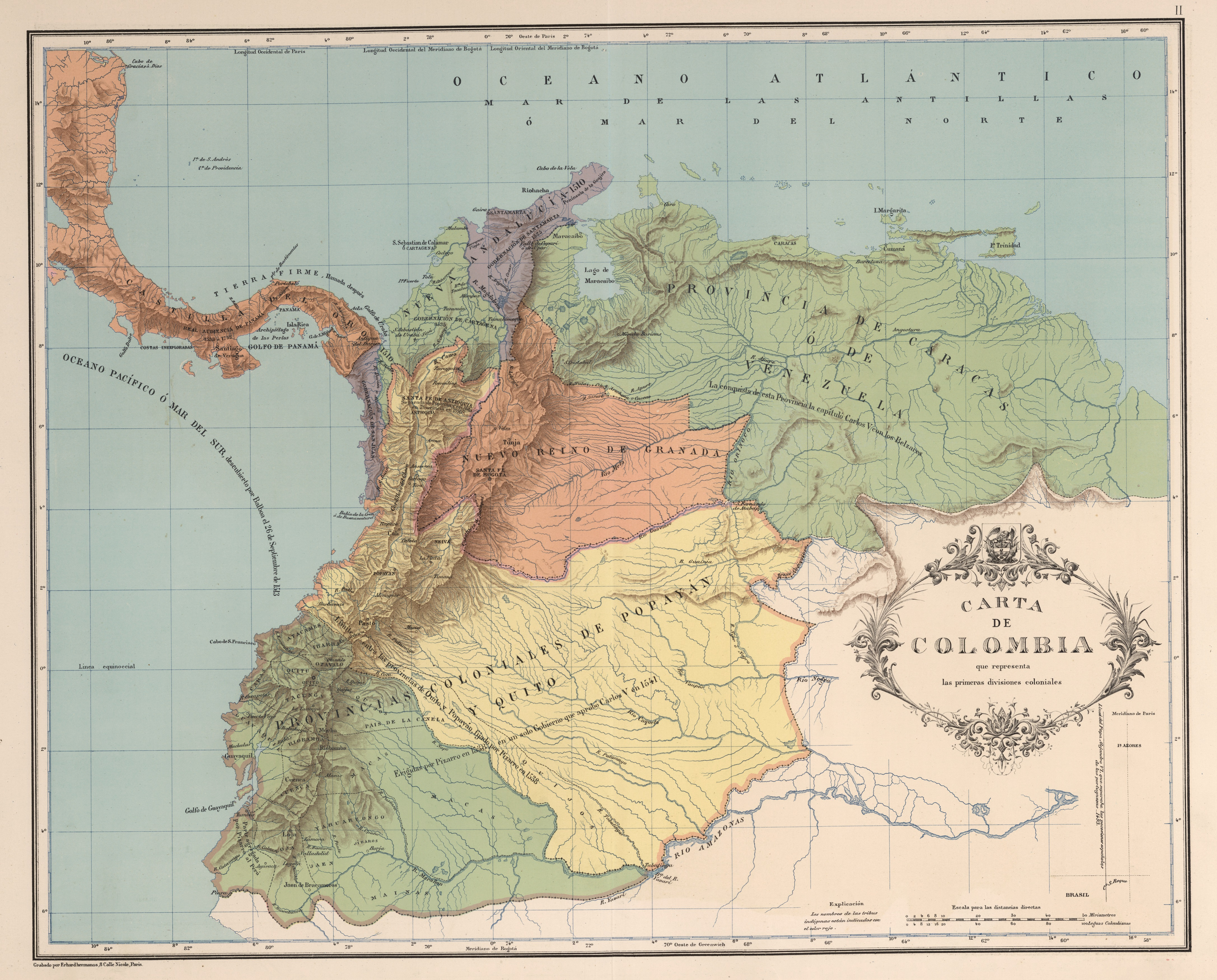
Early territorial subdivision of the Kingdom of Tierra Firme around 1538.

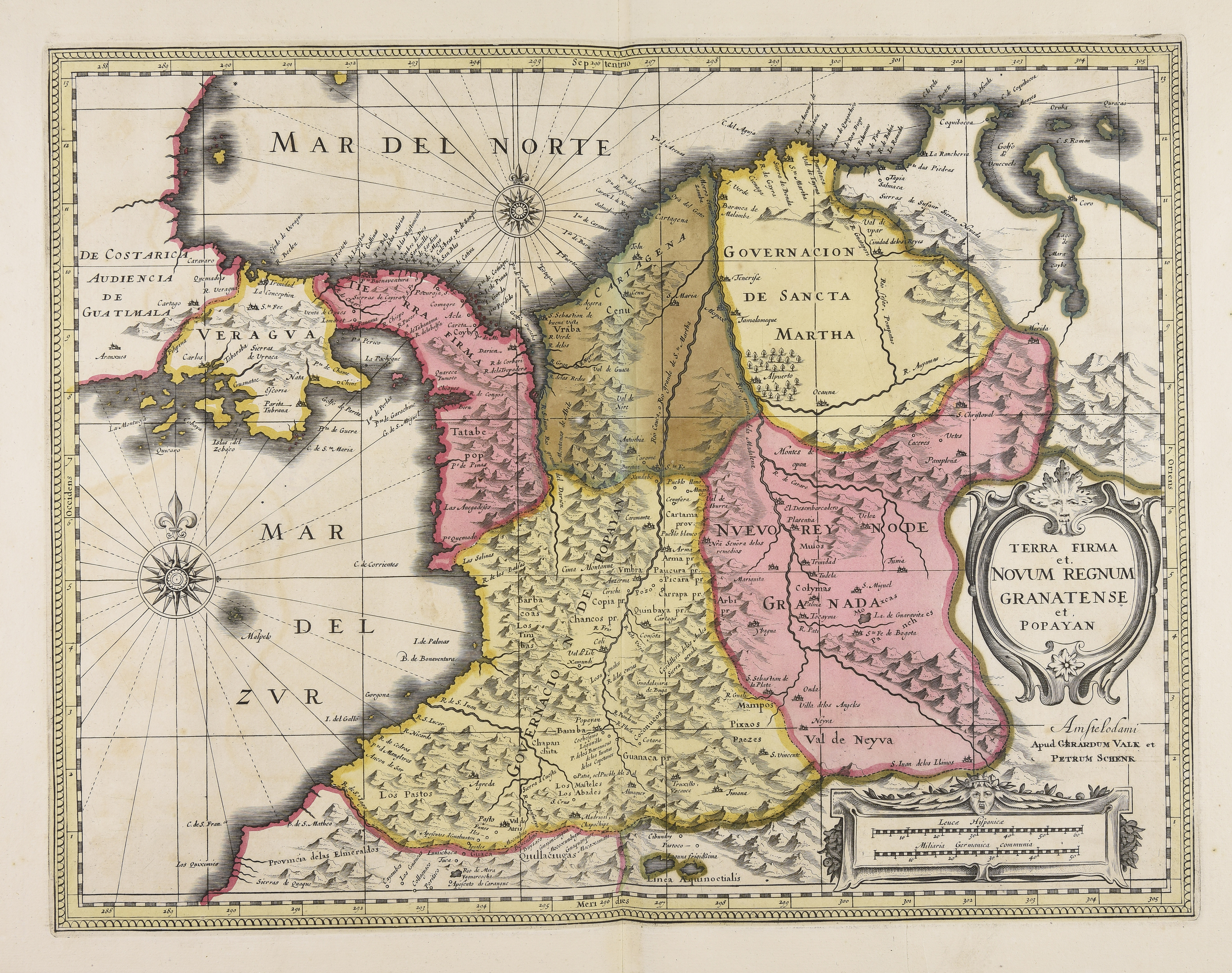
Map of the New Kingdom of Granada, the Kingdom of Tierra Firme and the Province of Popayán around 1630.

== Early Spanish Colonial Governorates in Tierra Firme (1498–1526) ==
Governorates and Provinces of the Columbian Viceroyalty in Tierra Firme (1498–1526)
Kingdom	Capital	Creation	Provinces	Capital	From	To	Notes
Tierra Firme	Santa María (1510–1520); Panama (1520–1526)	Aug 4, 1498	Castilla de Oro	Santa María	1514	1520	Capital transferred to Panama City
Tierra Firme	Santa María (1510–1520); Panama (1520–1526)	Aug 4, 1498	Castilla de Oro	Panama	1520	1526	Integrated into the Audiencia of Hispaniola
Tierra Firme	Santa María (1510–1520); Panama (1520–1526)	Aug 4, 1498	Coquivacoa	Santa Cruz	1502	1504	Abandoned by Alonso de Ojeda, its founder
Tierra Firme	Santa María (1510–1520); Panama (1520–1526)	Aug 4, 1498	Margarita	New Cadiz	1525	1526	Integrated into the Audiencia of Hispaniola
Tierra Firme	Santa María (1510–1520); Panama (1520–1526)	Aug 4, 1498	Santa Marta	Santa Marta	1525	1526	Integrated into the Audiencia of Hispaniola
Tierra Firme	Santa María (1510–1520); Panama (1520–1526)	Aug 4, 1498	Trinidad	Cumucurapo	1525	1526	Integrated into the Audiencia of Hispaniola
Tierra Firme	Santa María (1510–1520); Panama (1520–1526)	Aug 4, 1498	Veragua	Nombre de Dios	1508	1526	Integrated into the Audiencia of Hispaniola

== Viceroyalty of New Granada (1717–1822) ==
Subdivisions of the Real Audiencias of Santa Fe, Quito, Panama and Caracas (1717–1822)
Kingdom	Capital	Creation	Provinces	Capital	From	To	Notes
New Granada	Santa Fe	Jul 17, 1549	Santa Fe	Santa Fe	1549	1810	Declared autonomy and formed a free state
New Granada	Santa Fe	Jul 17, 1549	Santa Fe	Santa Fe	1816	1819	Reconquered in 1816. Part of Colombia in 1819
New Granada	Santa Fe	Jul 17, 1549	Antioquia	Antioquia	1576	1810	Declared autonomy and formed a free state
New Granada	Santa Fe	Jul 17, 1549	Antioquia	Antioquia	1816	1820	Reconquered in 1816. Part of Colombia in 1819
New Granada	Santa Fe	Jul 17, 1549	Borja	Borja	1717	1721	Returned to the Audiencia of Quito in 1721
New Granada	Santa Fe	Jul 17, 1549	Caracas	Caracas	1717	1725	Returned to the Audiencia of Santo Domingo in 1721
New Granada	Santa Fe	Jul 17, 1549	Cartagena	Cartagena	1549	1810	Declared autonomy and formed a free state
New Granada	Santa Fe	Jul 17, 1549	Cartagena	Cartagena	1816	1819	Reconquered in 1816. Part of Colombia in 1819
New Granada	Santa Fe	Jul 17, 1549	Casanare	Pore	1660	1810	Declared autonomy. Part of Colombia in 1819
New Granada	Santa Fe	Jul 17, 1549	Chocó	Nóvita	1726	1810	Declared autonomy and formed a free state
New Granada	Santa Fe	Jul 17, 1549	Chocó	Nóvita	1816	1820	Reconquered in 1816. Part of Colombia in 1820
New Granada	Santa Fe	Jul 17, 1549	Darién	Yaviza	1751	1821	Declared autonomy. Part of Colombia in 1822
New Granada	Santa Fe	Jul 17, 1549	Girón	Girón	1631	1794	Integrated into the Province of New Pamplona
New Granada	Santa Fe	Jul 17, 1549	Guayana	Angostura	1717	1725	Returned to the Audiencia of Santo Domingo in 1725
New Granada	Santa Fe	Jul 17, 1549	Guayana	Angostura	1762	1776	Returned to the Audiencia of Santo Domingo in 1776
New Granada	Santa Fe	Jul 17, 1549	Guayaquil	Guayaquil	1717	1721	Returned to the Audiencia of Quito in 1721
New Granada	Santa Fe	Jul 17, 1549	Jaén	Jaén	1717	1721	Returned to the Audiencia of Quito in 1721
New Granada	Santa Fe	Jul 17, 1549	Maracaibo	Maracaibo	1717	1776	Returned to the Audiencia of Santo Domingo in 1776
New Granada	Santa Fe	Jul 17, 1549	Margarita	La Asunción	1717	1725	Returned to the Audiencia of Santo Domingo in 1725
New Granada	Santa Fe	Jul 17, 1549	Mariquita	Mariquita	1564	1810	Declared autonomy and formed a free state
New Granada	Santa Fe	Jul 17, 1549	Mariquita	Mariquita	1810	1820	Reconquered in 1816. Part of Colombia in 1820
New Granada	Santa Fe	Jul 17, 1549	Neiva	Neiva	1610	1810	Declared autonomy and formed a free state
New Granada	Santa Fe	Jul 17, 1549	Neiva	Neiva	1810	1820	Reconquered in 1816. Part of Colombia in 1820
New Granada	Santa Fe	Jul 17, 1549	New Andalusia	Cumaná	1717	1725	Returned to the Audiencia of Santo Domingo in 1725
New Granada	Santa Fe	Jul 17, 1549	New Andalusia	Cumaná	1740	1776	Returned to the Audiencia of Santo Domingo in 1776
New Granada	Santa Fe	Jul 17, 1549	New Pamplona	New Pamplona	1795	1810	Declared autonomy and formed a free state
New Granada	Santa Fe	Jul 17, 1549	New Pamplona	New Pamplona	1816	1821	Reconquered in 1816. Part of Colombia in 1821
New Granada	Santa Fe	Jul 17, 1549	Panama	Panama	1751	1821	Declared autonomy. Part of Colombia in 1822
New Granada	Santa Fe	Jul 17, 1549	Popayán	Popayán	1718	1721	Returned to the Audiencia of Quito in 1721
New Granada	Santa Fe	Jul 17, 1549	Portobelo	Portobelo	1751	1821	Declared autonomy. Part of Colombia in 1822
New Granada	Santa Fe	Jul 17, 1549	Quijos y Macas	Baeza	1717	1721	Returned to the Audiencia of Quito in 1721
New Granada	Santa Fe	Jul 17, 1549	Quito	Quito	1717	1721	Returned to the Audiencia of Quito in 1721
New Granada	Santa Fe	Jul 17, 1549	Riohacha	Riohacha	1789	1823	Conquered by Colombia by 1823
New Granada	Santa Fe	Jul 17, 1549	San Faustino	San Faustino	1662	1810	Integrated into the Province of New Pamplona
New Granada	Santa Fe	Jul 17, 1549	Santa Marta	Santa Marta	1549	1822	Conquered by Colombia by 1822
New Granada	Santa Fe	Jul 17, 1549	Socorro	Socorro	1795	1810	Declared autonomy and formed a free state
New Granada	Santa Fe	Jul 17, 1549	Socorro	Socorro	1816	1821	Reconquered in 1816. Part of Colombia in 1821
New Granada	Santa Fe	Jul 17, 1549	Tierra Firme	Panama	1717	1722	Returned to the Audiencia of Tierra Firme in 1722
New Granada	Santa Fe	Jul 17, 1549	Trinidad	San José	1717	1725	Returned to the Audiencia of Santo Domingo in 1725
New Granada	Santa Fe	Jul 17, 1549	Tunja	Tunja	1549	1810	Declared autonomy and formed a free state
New Granada	Santa Fe	Jul 17, 1549	Tunja	Tunja	1816	1819	Reconquered in 1816. Part of Colombia in 1819
New Granada	Santa Fe	Jul 17, 1549	Veraguas	Veraguas	1717	1722	Returned to the Audiencia of Tierra Firme in 1722
New Granada	Santa Fe	Jul 17, 1549	Veraguas	Veraguas	1751	1821	Declared autonomy. Part of Colombia in 1822
Quito	Quito	Aug 29, 1563	Quito	Quito	1563	1810	Declared autonomy and formed a free state
Quito	Quito	Aug 29, 1563	Quito	Quito	1812	1822	Reconquered in 1812. Part of Colombia in 1822
Quito	Quito	Aug 29, 1563	Borja	Borja	1619	1822	Conquered by Colombia by 1822
Quito	Quito	Aug 29, 1563	Cuenca	Cuenca	1771	1822	Conquered by Colombia by 1822
Quito	Quito	Aug 29, 1563	Esmeraldas	Atacames	1738	1793	Integrated into the Province of Popayán
Quito	Quito	Aug 29, 1563	Guayaquil	Guayaquil	1563	1804	Returned to the Audiencia of Peru in 1804
Quito	Quito	Aug 29, 1563	Jaén	Jaén	1563	1821	Joined the Republic of Peru in 1821
Quito	Quito	Aug 29, 1563	Quijos	Baeza	1775	1804	Returned to the Audiencia of Peru in 1804
Quito	Quito	Aug 29, 1563	Quijos y Macas	Baeza	1563	1775	Separated into the Provinces of Quijos and Macas
Quito	Quito	Aug 29, 1563	Popayán	Popayán	1563	1821	Conquered by Colombia by 1821
Quito	Quito	Aug 29, 1563	Maynas	Jéberos	1619	1804	Returned to the Audiencia of Peru in 1804
Quito	Quito	Aug 29, 1563	Macas	Macas	1775	1822	Conquered by Colombia by 1822
Tierra Firme	Panama	Sep 8, 1563	Tierra Firme	Panama	1563	1751	Passed to the Audiencia of New Granada in 1751
Tierra Firme	Panama	Sep 8, 1563	Veraguas	Veraguas	1563	1751	Passed to the Audiencia of New Granada in 1751
Venezuela	Caracas	Jul 6, 1786	Caracas	Caracas	1786	1811	Integrated into the First Republic of Venezuela
Venezuela	Caracas	Jul 6, 1786	Guayana	Angostura	1786	1817	Integrated into the Third Republic of Venezuela
Venezuela	Caracas	Jul 6, 1786	Barinas	Barinas	1786	1811	Integrated into the First Republic of Venezuela
Venezuela	Caracas	Jul 6, 1786	Maracaibo	Maracaibo	1786	1821	Conquered by Colombia by 1821
Venezuela	Caracas	Jul 6, 1786	Margarita	La Asunción	1786	1811	Integrated into the First Republic of Venezuela
Venezuela	Caracas	Jul 6, 1786	New Andalusia	Cumaná	1786	1811	Integrated into the First Republic of Venezuela
Venezuela	Caracas	Jul 6, 1786	Trinidad	Puerto España	1786	1797	Conquered by the United Kingdom

== United Provinces of New Granada and Free State of Cundinamarca (1811–1816) ==
Country	Capital	Creation	Provinces	Capital	From	To	Notes
United Provinces	Tunja	Nov 27, 1811	Antioquia	Antioquia	1811	1816	Reconquered by Spain in 1816
United Provinces	Tunja	Nov 27, 1811	Cartagena	Cartagena	1811	1816	Reconquered by Spain in 1816
United Provinces	Tunja	Nov 27, 1811	Casanare	Pore	1814	1819	Incorporated into Colombia in 1819
United Provinces	Tunja	Nov 27, 1811	Chocó	Nóvita	1813	1816	Reconquered by Spain in 1816
United Provinces	Tunja	Nov 27, 1811	Cundinamarca	Santa Fe	1812	1812	Left the federation in 1812
United Provinces	Tunja	Nov 27, 1811	Cundinamarca	Santa Fe	1814	1816	Reconquered by Spain in 1816
United Provinces	Tunja	Nov 27, 1811	Mariquita	Mariquita	1814	1816	Reconquered by Spain in 1816
United Provinces	Tunja	Nov 27, 1811	Neiva	Neiva	1811	1816	Reconquered by Spain in 1816
United Provinces	Tunja	Nov 27, 1811	Pamplona	Pamplona	1811	1816	Reconquered by Spain in 1816
United Provinces	Tunja	Nov 27, 1811	Socorro	Socorro	1812	1816	Reconquered by Spain in 1816
United Provinces	Tunja	Nov 27, 1811	Tunja	Tunja	1811	1816	Reconquered by Spain in 1816
United Provinces	Tunja	Nov 27, 1811	Valle del Cauca	Cali	1812	1816	Reconquered by Spain in 1816
Cundinamarca	Santa Fe	Apr 4, 1811	Cundinamarca	Santa Fe	1811	1814	Conquered by the United Provinces in 1814
Cundinamarca	Santa Fe	Apr 4, 1811	Casanare	Pore	1813	1814	Conquered by the United Provinces in 1814
Cundinamarca	Santa Fe	Apr 4, 1811	Chocó	Nóvita	1811	1813	Joined the United Provinces in 1813
Cundinamarca	Santa Fe	Apr 4, 1811	Socorro	Socorro	1812	1812	Joined the United Provinces in 1812

== Republic of Colombia (Gran Colombia) (1819–1831) ==
Subdivisions of the Republic of Colombia (1819–1831)
Department	Capital	Admission	Provinces	Capital
Apure	Barinas	Jun 25, 1824	Barinas	Barinas
Apure	Barinas	Jun 25, 1824	Achaguas	Achaguas
Azuay	Cuenca	Jun 25, 1824	Cuenca	Cuenca
Azuay	Cuenca	Jun 25, 1824	Loja	Loja
Azuay	Cuenca	Jun 25, 1824	Jaén y Maynas	Jaén
Boyacá	Tunja	Oct 2, 1821	Casanare	Pore
Boyacá	Tunja	Oct 2, 1821	Pamplona	Pamplona
Boyacá	Tunja	Oct 2, 1821	Socorro	Socorro
Boyacá	Tunja	Oct 2, 1821	Tunja	Tunja
Cauca	Popayán	Oct 2, 1821	Buenaventura	Iscuandé
Cauca	Popayán	Oct 2, 1821	Chocó	Nóvita
Cauca	Popayán	Oct 2, 1821	Pasto	Pasto
Cauca	Popayán	Oct 2, 1821	Popayán	Popayán
Cundinamarca	Bogotá	Dec 19, 1819	Antioquia	Antioquia
Cundinamarca	Bogotá	Dec 19, 1819	Bogotá	Bogotá
Cundinamarca	Bogotá	Dec 19, 1819	Mariquita	Mariquita
Cundinamarca	Bogotá	Dec 19, 1819	Neiva	Neiva
Ecuador	Quito	May 29, 1822	Chimborazo	Riobamba
Ecuador	Quito	May 29, 1822	Imbabura	Ibarra
Ecuador	Quito	May 29, 1822	Pichincha	Quito
Guayaquil	Guayaquil	Jun 25, 1824	Guayaquil	Guayaquil
Guayaquil	Guayaquil	Jun 25, 1824	Manabí	Portoviejo
Istmo	Panama	Feb 9, 1822	Panama	Panama
Istmo	Panama	Feb 9, 1822	Veraguas	Santiago
Magdalena	Cartagena	Oct 2, 1821	Cartagena	Cartagena
Magdalena	Cartagena	Oct 2, 1821	Riohacha	Riohacha
Magdalena	Cartagena	Oct 2, 1821	Santa Marta	Santa Marta
Maturín	Cumaná	Oct 2, 1821	Cumaná	Cumaná
Maturín	Cumaná	Oct 2, 1821	Barcelona	Barcelona
Maturín	Cumaná	Oct 2, 1821	Margarita	La Asunción
Orinoco	Cumaná	Oct 2, 1821	Apure	Achaguas
Orinoco	Cumaná	Oct 2, 1821	Barinas	Barinas
Orinoco	Cumaná	Oct 2, 1821	Cumaná	Cumaná
Orinoco	Cumaná	Oct 2, 1821	Barcelona	Barcelona
Orinoco	Cumaná	Oct 2, 1821	Guayana	Angostura
Orinoco	Cumaná	Oct 2, 1821	Margarita	La Asunción
Venezuela	Caracas	Dec 19, 1819	Carabobo	Valencia
Venezuela	Caracas	Dec 19, 1819	Caracas	Caracas
Spanish Haiti	Santo Domingo	Dec 1, 1821	Santo Domingo	Santo Domingo
Zulia	Maracaibo	Oct 2, 1821	Coro	Coro
Zulia	Maracaibo	Oct 2, 1821	Maracaibo	Maracaibo
Zulia	Maracaibo	Oct 2, 1821	Mérida	Mérida
Zulia	Maracaibo	Oct 2, 1821	Trujillo	Trujillo

== United States of Colombia (1863–1886) ==
=== States of the United States of Colombia (1863–1886) ===
States of the United States of Colombia (1863–1886)
Name		Capital	Established		Population (1874)	Total area (1874)	
Name		Capital	State creation	Joined the US of Colombia	Population (1874)	mi^{2}	km^{2}
Antioquia	ANT	Medellín	June 11, 1856	May 8, 1863	365,974	22,780	59,000
Bolívar	BOL	Cartagena	June 15, 1857	May 8, 1863	241,704	27,027	70,000
Boyacá	BOY	Tunja	June 15, 1857	May 8, 1863	482,874	33,350	86,375
Cauca	CAU	Popayán	June 15, 1857	May 8, 1863	435,078	258,071	668,400
Cundinamarca	CUN	Bogotá	June 15, 1857	May 8, 1863	409,602	79,691	206,400
Magdalena	MAG	Santa Marta	June 15, 1857	May 8, 1863	85,275	25,846	66,941
Panamá	PAN	Panamá	February 27, 1855	May 8, 1863	221,052	33,282	86,200
Santander	SAN	Socorro	May 13, 1857	May 8, 1863	425,427	16,448	42,600
Tolima	TOL	Ibagué	April 12, 1861	May 8, 1863	230,891	18,417	47,700

=== Federal District of the United States of Colombia (1863–1886) ===
Federal District of the United States of Colombia (1863–1886)
Name		Capital	Established		Population (1851)	Total area (1862)	
Name		Capital	Creation	Suppression	Population (1851)	mi^{2}	km^{2}
Federal District	DF	Bogotá	July 23, 1861	May 11, 1864	29,649	3	8

=== Territories of the United States of Colombia (1863–1886) ===
Territories of the United States of Colombia (1863–1886)
Name		Capital	Established		Under the jurisdiction of
Name		Capital	Creation	Suppression	State
Bolívar	ANT	Landázuri	September 30, 1870	August 5, 1886	Santander
Caquetá	BOL	Mocoa	June 15, 1857	August 5, 1886	Cauca
Casanare	BOY	Tame	September 5, 1868	August 5, 1886	Boyacá
La Guajira	CAU	Riohacha	June 15, 1857	August 5, 1886	Magdalena
San Andrés	CUN	San Andrés	June 15, 1857	August 5, 1886	Bolívar
San Martín	MAG	San Martín	June 15, 1857	August 5, 1886	Cundinamarca
Sierra Nevada	PAN	Espíritu Santo	June 15, 1857	August 5, 1886	Magdalena
Vásquez	SAN	Puerto Reyes	June 15, 1857	August 5, 1886	Cundinamarca
