= Mainas missions =

Jesuit and Franciscan missions in the Western Amazon

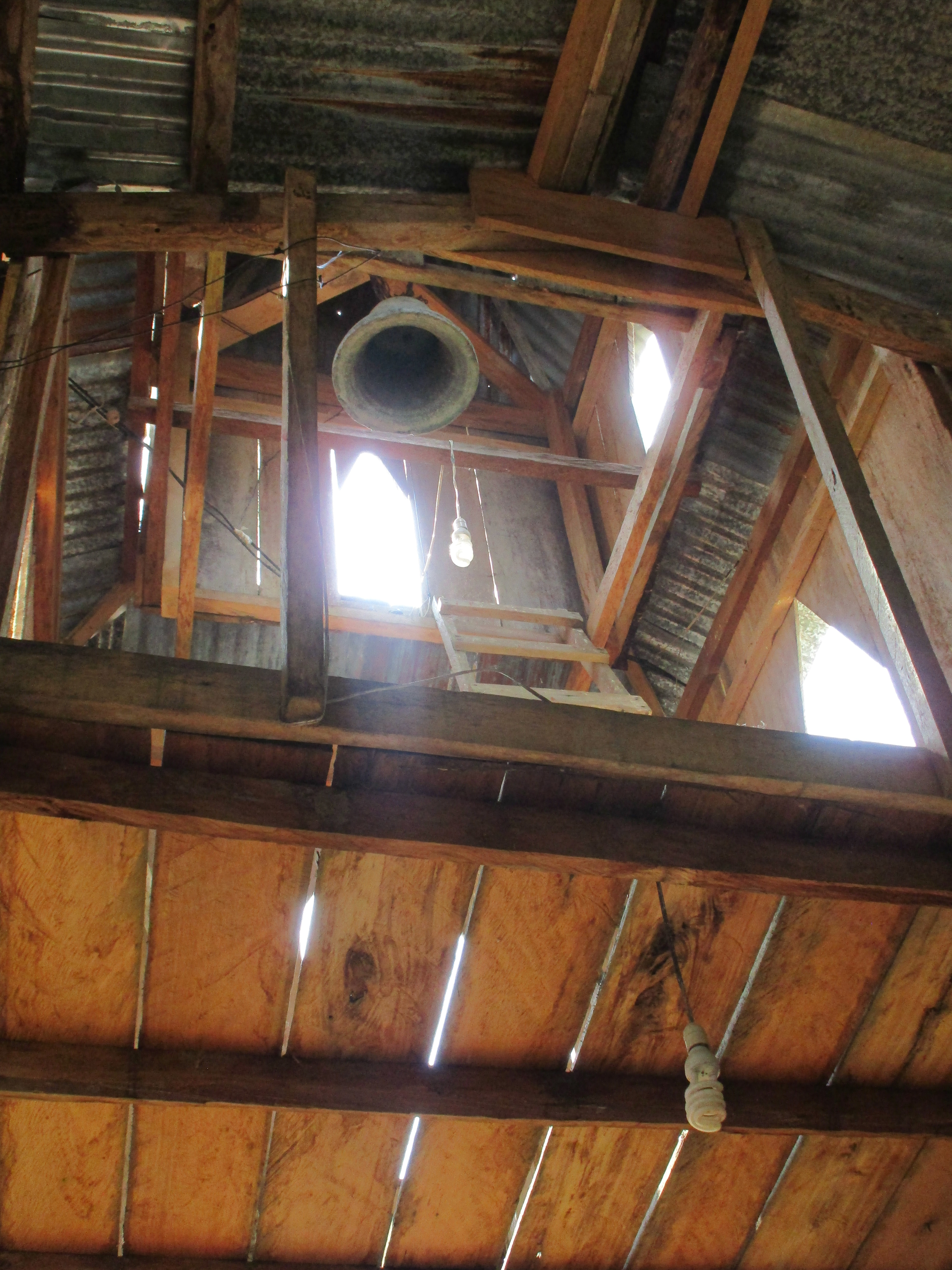
Remains of the 17th century colonial church of San Joaquín de Omaguas in Loreto.

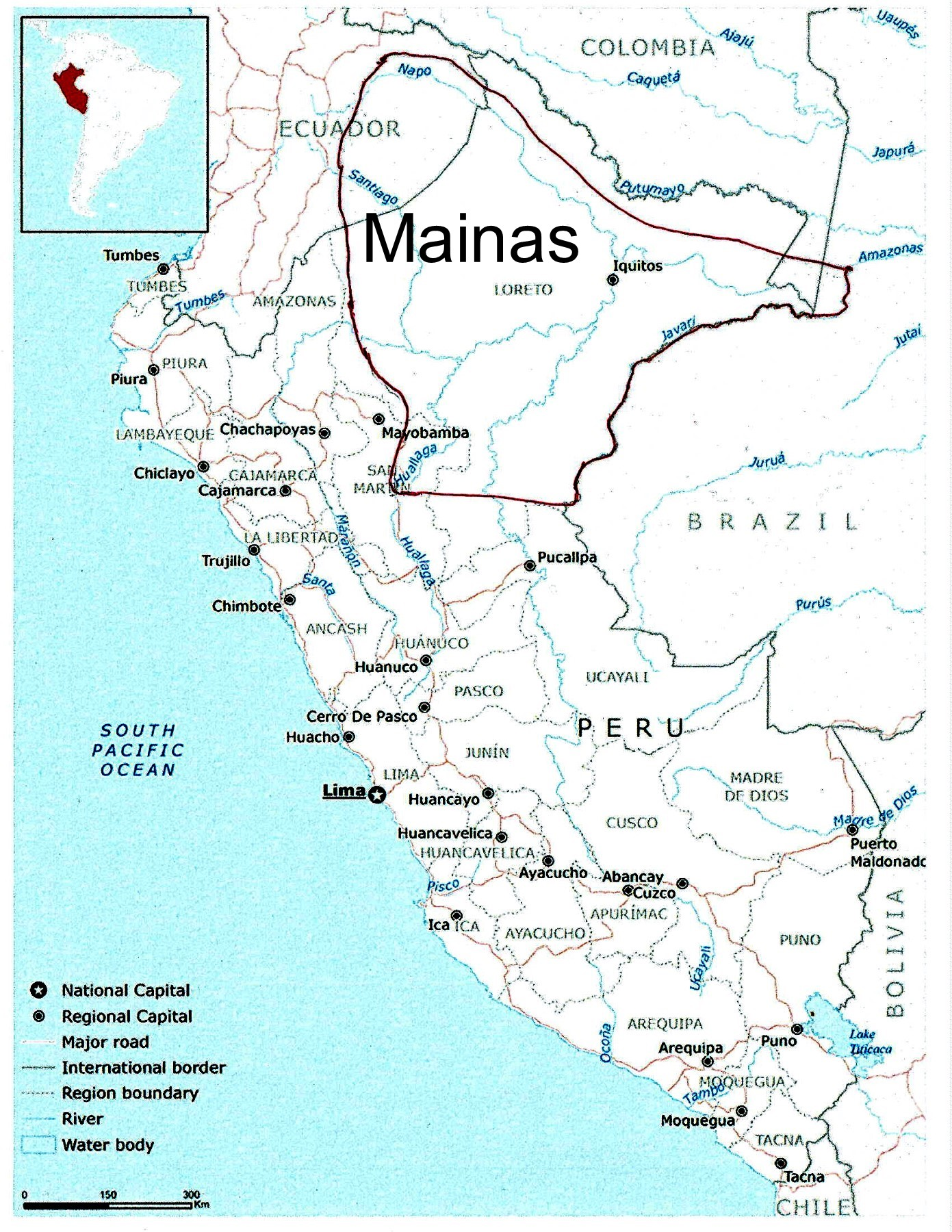
The Mainas region was mostly in Peru, but extended into Ecuador, Brazil, and Colombia.

The Mainas (or Maynas) missions refers to a large number of small missions the Jesuits established in the western Amazon region of South America from 1638 until 1767, when the Jesuits were expelled from Latin America. Following the Jesuit expulsion, mission activity continued under Franciscan auspices.

Roughly 60 missions were founded in total. Scholar Anne Christine Taylor notes that, '[o]f all the western Amazonian mission establishments, that of the Jesuits of Mainas was by far the most important'. She estimates that, prior to the arrival of the Spanish, the many ethnic groups (called Indians or Indios) in the mission field had a population of approximately 200,000. The population declined rapidly and many of the indigenous people resisted Christianity or had little contact with the Christian missionaries. Throughout their existence, the Jesuit mission settlements, known as reductions, were marked by epidemic disease (often smallpox) that exacted a large death toll on the indigenous people resident in them. Slave raids also took a toll on the population and many of the indigenous people avoided or escaped missions.

'Maynas' or 'Mainas' refers to the Maina people, indigenous to the area around the Marañón River. The area in which the missions were established includes the 21st century area of Maynas Province, Peru, and adjacent areas of Peru, Ecuador, Colombia, and Brazil. The Jivaro, Kokama, Cambeba, Secoya, and Yame were among the other indigenous peoples the missionaries sought to convert.

== Overview ==
Christian missions by the Jesuits were one element of the broader Spanish colonial project in the Americas. Historian Ann Taylor characterizes the objective of the missions as "pav[ing] the way for the spread of colonial institutions through cultural means" by using religious and other ideological tools to induce indigenous people to conform to colonial priorities. The Jesuit missions competed with the secular colonists and government for control of the indigenous population which declined rapidly during the mission period due to the introduction of European diseases, overwork and exploitation on Spanish farms, and the ravages of the Bandeirantes, slavers from Portuguese Brazil. The result of the stress on native societies was a reduction in the indigenous population of the Mainas mission area from an estimated 200,000 in 1550 to 30,000 in 1730.

The Jesuits sought to congregate semi-nomadic indigenous people into Spanish-style settlements called reductions, thereby facilitating their Christianization. The colonial governors sought in addition to subject the indigenous to the encomienda or repartimiento systems of labour extraction, forcing the Indians in the reductions to labor on Spanish farms. At times, conflict broke out between the religious orders and the state with regard to control over the indigenous population. Thus, the two organizations were allied in complex ways in the western Amazon from the 17th to 19th centuries.

The Jesuit missions offered the indigenous people Christianity, iron tools, and a small degree of protection from the slavers and the colonists. In exchange, the indigenous had to submit to Jesuit discipline and adopt, at least superficially, a life style foreign to their experience. The population of the missions was only sustained by frequent expeditions into the jungle by Jesuits, soldiers, and Christian Indians to capture indigenous people and force them to return or to settle in the missions.

Knowledge of the Mainas missions derives largely from missionary accounts of their activities. Thus, as Newson notes, a complete account is "difficult to establish in detail".

=== Rebellion ===
The immediate impetus for missionary work in the region was a 1635 (or 1637, or 1640) rebellion by the Maina people against Spanish colonialists. (Note: Accounts of the precise date of this rebellion vary widely, but it—perhaps in multiple instalments—probably occurred between 1635 and 1640.) The Maina rebelled against the encomienda system, a system analogous to slavery which 'gave individual Spaniards the right to demand labor and tribute from the Indians assigned to them ... and also turned them into de facto administrators, responsible for the control and the welfare of these Indians'.

Reeve describes the system, as practised in the early 17th century in Mainas, as 'exceedingly harsh': the vast majority of indigenous peoples co-opted into Mainas encomiendas died, and the colonial government used military force to put down those who had not been brought into the system.

The colonial strategy changed around 1636–38, however. According to Clements Markham, Pedro Vaca de Vega (known as Don Pedro Vaca and styled Governador de los Maynas), the colonial governor of Mainas province, had 'despaired of subjugating the Indians by force' and hoped that the Jesuits 'might succeed in tranquillizing them by persuasion'. Accordingly, he hoped to bring Jesuit missionaries to the area. Reeve concurs, suggesting that the governor's change of heart was due to the recent history of violence in the area.

=== 17th century ===
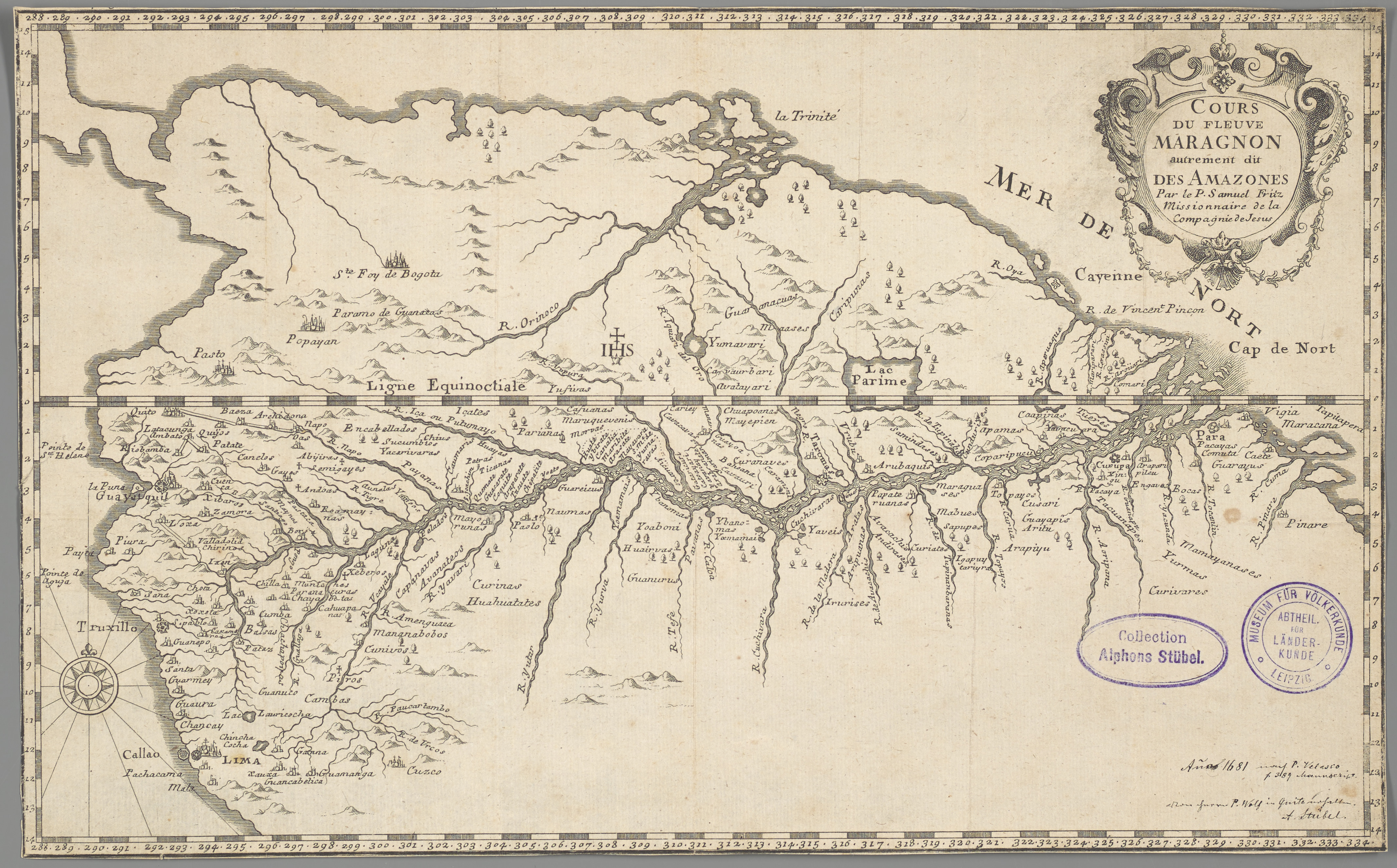
A map (c. 1717) of the Marañón by Samuel Fritz, who was superior of the Mainas missions in the early 18th century.

Two missionaries, then at Quito, initially responded to Vaca's request for mission-founders: Father Lucas de la Cueva (known as Father Cueva) and Father Cujia. Fathers Cueva and Cujia arrived at Borja on 6 February 1638, not long after the city was founded in 1619.

Mission activity began in the area around Borja, Peru on the Marañon River and in the valley of the Huallaga River (a tributary of the Marañón). The Jesuits sought to 'induc[e]' indigenous peoples to settle in reductions, as opposed to their traditional modes of habitation and forms of government. This would have been a difficult assignment in the best of circumstances, coming as it did shortly after a violent rebellion. More so, because although the Jesuits would ultimately found 'dozens' of missions in the region, there were not many missionaries to go around. Nonetheless, by 1660, the Jesuits had 'catechized' around 10,000 people. Newson estimates that this was about 10–15 percent of the indigenous population in the region at the time.

The missions were backed by colonial forces. The Jesuits travelled with soldiers, and the colonial governor would periodically send his forces on entradas—a missionary's initial attempt to establish contact with those he sought to convert, using 'food and gifts' as inducement.

In 1689, Fritz began his descent down the Amazon River, entering by the area occupied by the Portuguese along the Solimões River, in the current state of Amazonas in Brazil. He founded the missions of Nossa Senhora de Guadalupe (current city of Fonte Boa, AM), São Paulo dos Cambebas (São Paulo de Olivença, AM), Castro de Avelães (Amaturá, AM), Santa Teresa do Tape (Tefé, AM) and Santana de Coari (Coari, AM), all on already identified Portuguese routes since 1660 (LOREIRO, 1978 apud REZENDE, 2006, p. 135).

Reeve notes that the missionaries were largely dependent on 'indigenous guides and interpreters' in seeking out new fields for expansion: guides would bring the Jesuits to territories their people knew well, or with which their people were allied. She observes, then, that '[t]o a remarkable degree, the process of proselytization and mission formation followed indigenous alliance networks across the region'.

=== 18th century ===
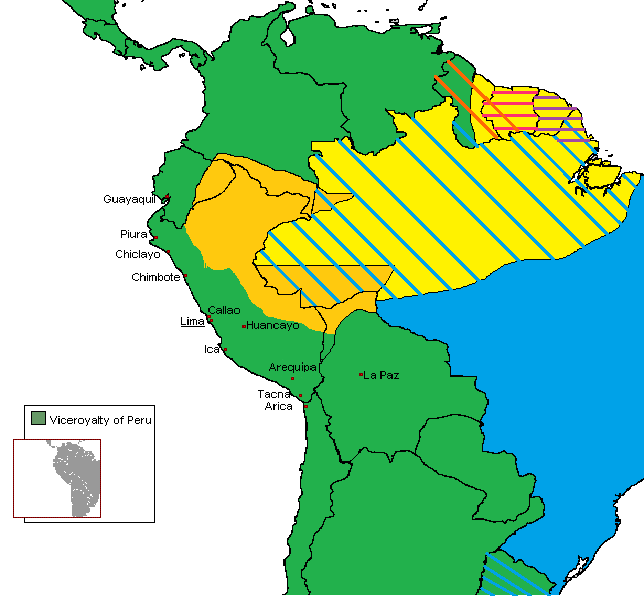
The General Command of Maynas (in mustard yellow), a district of the Viceroyalty of Peru, as it appeared c. 1802. Missions were dispersed throughout this area.

Samuel Fritz served as superior of the Mainas missions from 1704–12. Fritz sought to expand the missions further outwards, which provoked trouble with Portuguese slave traders.

After the Jesuits were expelled in 1767, Mainas came under the control of Franciscans. At the time of the expulsion the Jesuits had between 25 and 37 Mainas missions with about 14,000 Indians in residence.

=== 19th century ===
There was evidently a mission infrastructure in Mainas as late as the 1850s. William Lewis Herndon, exploring the Amazon for the United States Navy, described missions in the Mainas region that traded various goods with Brazil. He further noted:

I know of no legal establishment in the Missions—the law proceeding out of the mouths of the governors. Indians are punished by flogging or confinement in the stocks; whites are sometimes imprisoned; but if their offence is of a grave nature, they are sent to be tried and judged by the courts of the capital.

Herndon also observed that the indigenous inhabitants of the Mainas missions, unique among the 'Indians of Peru', had been exempted from the payment of a head tax, because 'these people had the forest to subdue, and were only able to wring a hard-earned support from the cultivation of the land'. He remarked that white settlers objected to this, and thought that 'some law compelling them to work' would be preferable. (Note: This head tax evidently had historical roots in medieval Spanish practices. See Simpson, Lesley Byrd (1982). The Encomienda in New Spain: The Beginning of Spanish Mexico. Berkeley, California: University of California Press. p. 150. ISBN 978-0-520-04630-6.)

== Effects ==
Disease and slavery were common in the Mainas missions.

Over the 129 years of Jesuit missionary activity in the Mainas region, numerous epidemics of smallpox and other diseases exacted a severe toll on indigenous peoples.

Slave raids, whereby Portuguese colonialists, known as bandeirantes, would capture and enslave indigenous people, were frequent throughout the period. Fritz's tenure in the Mainas missions, in particular, was marked by a number of Portuguese slave raids.

== See also ==
- Reductions
- Chiquitania
- Jesuit Block and Estancias of Córdoba (Argentina)
- La Santisima Trinidad de Paraná and Jesús de Tavarangue (Paraguay)
- List of Jesuit sites

== Sources ==
- Reeve, Mary-Elizabeth (1993). "Regional Interaction in the Western Amazon: The Early Colonial Encounter and the Jesuit Years: 1538–1767". Ethnohistory. 41 (1): 106–138. doi:10.2307/3536980. JSTOR 3536980.
- Livi-Bacci, Massimo (30 August 2016). "The Depopulation of Upper Amazonia in Colonial Times". Revista de Indias. 76 (267): 419–448. doi:10.3989/revindias.2016.013. ISSN 1988-3188.
- Markham, Clements Robert (1859). Expeditions into the Valley of the Amazons. London: T. Richards (for the Hakluyt Society).
- Newson, Linda A. (1995). Life and Death in Early Colonial Ecuador. Norman, Oklahoma: University of Oklahoma Press. p. 306. ISBN 0-585-11850-7. OCLC 44955330.
- Taylor, Anne Christine (28 October 1999), "The Western Margins of Amazonia from the Early Sixteenth to the Early Nineteenth Century", in Salomon, Frank; Schwartz, Stuart B. (eds.), The Cambridge History of the Native Peoples of the Americas, vol. 3, Cambridge University Press, pp. 188–256, doi:10.1017/chol9780521630764.005, ISBN 978-1-139-05379-2
- Waisman, Leonardo (2020), "Music in the Jesuit Missions of the Upper Marañón", in Newson, Linda A. (ed.), Cultural Worlds of the Jesuits in Colonial Latin America, University of London Press, pp. 111–126, ISBN 978-1-908857-62-0, JSTOR j.ctvwrm4h1.10
