= Governorate of Quijos =

Governorate of the Spanish Empire

Governorate of Quijos Gobierno de Quixos
- Governorate of the Spanish Empire
- 1559–1802
- Flag
- Capital: Baeza
- Historical era: Conquista
  - Established: 9 September 1559
  - Official name: 1577
  - Disestablished: 15 July 1802
Preceded by	Succeeded by
Quijos people	General Command of Maynas

The Governorate of Quijos (Spanish: Gobierno de Quijos / Gobernación de los Quijos), also known unofficially as the Province of the Quijos (Spanish: Provincia de los Quijos, formerly Quixos) prior to 1577, was one of the provinces established at the eastern part of the Real Audiencia of Quito in 1559, varying between the Viceroyalties of Peru (1559–1717; 1723–1739) and New Granada (1717–1723; 1739–1802) until its ultimate reincorporation to Peru through the real cédula of July 15, 1802, as part of the General Command of Maynas.

== History ==
The history of the area, named after the Quijos people, dates back to a commission sent there by the Sapa Inca Túpac Yupanqui to investigate the existence of gold deposits. Another expedition was later sent by Huayna Cápac prior to its ultimate invasion by troops sent by Atahualpa. The troops, headed by Rumiñahui, were initially defeated at Pillaro, but nevertheless succeeded in their occupation. By the time the city of Quito was founded in 1534, the existence of the Quijos was already known to the Conquistadores, with the first Spaniards arriving in 1538 in the search for El Dorado and La Canela.

In 1541, Gonzalo Pizarro and Gonzalo Díaz de Pineda, joined later by Francisco de Orellana at the valley of the Sumaco (later known as Ávila), reach the area. A year later, Orellana discovers the Amazon River. In 1553, the priests of the Dominican Order are put in charge of the missions in the area. The territory was formally established as part of the Spanish Empire by Andrés Hurtado de Mendoza, 3rd Marquis of Cañete, then Viceroy of Peru, on September 9, 1559, from his seat in Lima. It received its name of "Governorate" in 1577.

The Quijos people rose up against the Spanish on a number of occasions, the first in 1560. The best known of these uprisings was in 1578, under the command of the Indian Jumandy (as well as Beto, Huambi and Imbate). The town of Ávila was destroyed on November 29, soon followed by Archidona. The same fate did not befall Baeza, as the Spanish prevented the Indians' advance into the city. The rebellion failed, with its participants jailed and executed at San Blas de Quito.

With the creation of the Republic of Colombia in 1819, during the Spanish American Wars of Independence, the new state claimed the area of the governorate. The creation of the Protectorate of Peru in 1821 (and its successor republic) and of Ecuador led to a number of disputes between Colombia and Peru and between Ecuador and Peru due to the overlapping control of different parts of the governorate. For example: in 1830, Captain José Camino requested permission of the Colombian prefect to populate Quijos and Baeza, while in 1852, José María Urvina expelled the Jesuits from the area as president of Ecuador. Meanwhile, Peru had incorporated the General Command of Maynas (of which Quijos was part of, excluding the village of Papallacta, due to the real cédula of 1802) into its Department of Trujillo by 1825.

== List of governors ==
The following is an incomplete list of governors (governadores) of Quijos:

- 1559 – 14 September 1559: Gil Ramírez Dávalos
- 14 September 1559 – 1560: Rodrigo Núñez de Bonilla Sr. (Died in office)
- 1560–1561 (interim): Alonso de Bastidas
- 24 December 1561 – 1575: Melchor Vásquez de Ávila
- 1576 – ?: Agustín de Ahumada, brother of Teresa of Ávila
- 13 March 1617 – c. 1625: Alonso de Miranda

== See also ==
- Governorate of Maynas
- Colombian–Peruvian territorial dispute
- Ecuadorian–Peruvian territorial dispute
