= Pongo de Manseriche =

Feature of the Marañón River, Peru

- Canyon
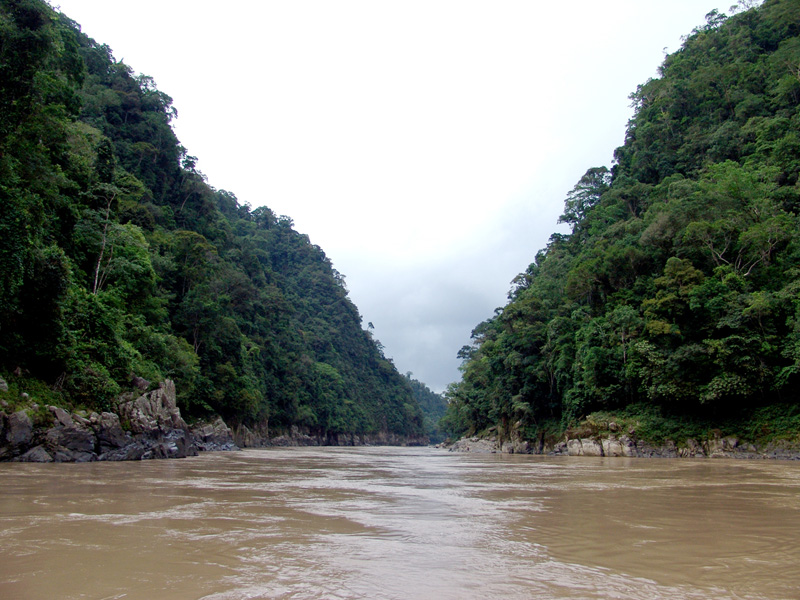

- Location within Peru
- Coordinates: 4.45833°S 77.5808°W
- Location: Peru; Regions of Amazonas and Loreto

Dimensions
  - Length: 4.8 kilometres (3 mi)
  - Width: 30 metres (30 yd)

The Pongo de Manseriche is a gorge in northwest Peru. The Marañón River runs through this gorge (and water gap) before it reaches the Amazon Basin.

The Pongo ('gate' in Quechua) de Manseriche is 3 miles (4.8 km) long, located at 4° 27′ 30″ south latitude and 77° 34′ 51″ west longitude, just below the mouth of the Río Santiago, and between it and the old missionary station of Borja.

According to Captain Carvajal, who descended the Pongo in the little steamer Napo, in 1868, it is a vast rent in the Andes about 2,000 ft (610 m) deep, narrowing in places to a width of only 100 ft (30 m), the precipices "seeming to close in at the top." Through this dark canyon the Marañón leaps along, at times, at the rate of 12 mph (19 km/h).

The Pongo de Manseriche was first discovered (by Europeans) by the Spanish Adelantado and conqueror Juan de Salinas y Loyola. He fitted out an expedition at Loja in Ecuador, descended the Rio Santiago to the Marañón, passed through the Pongo in 1557 and invaded the country of the Maina Indians. Later, the missionaries of Cajamarca and Cusco established many missions in the Maynas, and made extensive use of the Pongo de Manseriche as an avenue of communication with their several convents on the Andean plateau. According to their accounts, the huge rent in the Andes, the Pongo, is about five or six miles (9.7 km) long, and in places not more than 80 feet (24 m) wide, and is a frightful series of torrents and whirlpools interspersed with rocks. There is an ancient tradition of the indigenous people of the vicinity that one of their gods descended the Marañón and another ascended the Amazon to communicate with him. They opened the pass called the Pongo de Manseriche.
