= Battle of Higos Urco =

First Battle of Higos Urco
- Part of the Peruvian conquest of Maynas in the Peruvian War of Independence
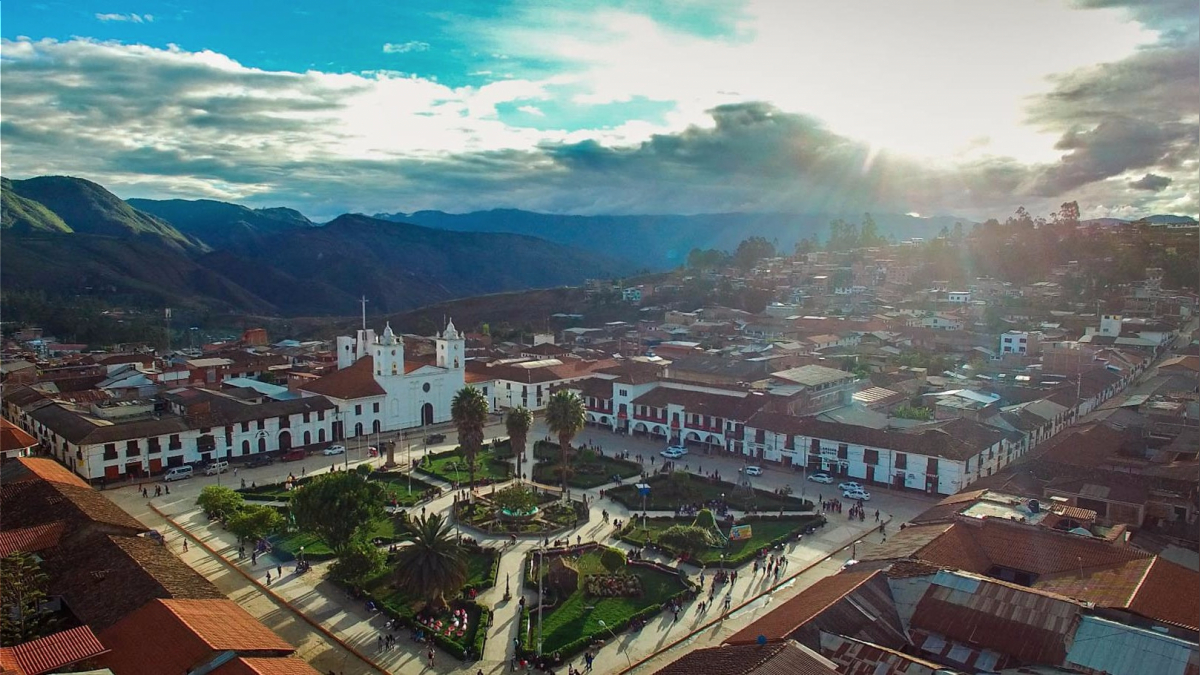
- On the hill on the left the First and Second Battle of Higos Urco took place.
Date	6 June 1821
Location	Chachapoyas, Maynas, Spain
Result	Patriot victory

Belligerents
Chachapoyans rebels	Spanish Empire

Commanders and leaders
Mariano Aguilar	José María Matos

Strength
300 men	600 men 2 cannons

Casualties and losses
50 killed	300 killed 1 cannon captured

The First Battle of Higos Urco, near Chachapoyas in the General Command of Maynas, was part of the War of Independence of Maynas.

The battle began on 6 June 1821. It was joined by small pro-independence and pro-Spanish forces. The battle was part of the campaign which led to the proclamation of Peruvian independence on 28 July 1821.

== Background ==
The deposed royalist subdelegate for Chota, Mariano Castro Taboada, a veteran military man from the defense of Zaragoza, was entrusted by the viceroy Joaquín de la Pezuela (1816-1821) with the task of isolating the government of Trujillo from the mountain and trans-Andean provinces. To this end, the king 's garrison of 600 troops was mobilized and stationed in this city, with the plan of successively taking Chachapoyas, Cajamarca and Huamachuco, and reestablishing by force, in all these localities, colonial authority.

The inhabitants of Chachapoyas joined the cause of Peruvian independence. In April 1821, they supported the action of San Martín's liberating army, ignored the Spanish authorities and exiled the subdelegate Francisco Baquedano and the bishop of Maynas, Hipólito Sánchez, who were fighting against independence.

== The first battle ==
The battle took place on June 6, 1821, in the Higos-Urco plain, near Chachapoyas. The royalist troops deployed in guerrilla warfare, supported by the fire of two light cannons. The patriots resisted the attack on foot, fighting hand to hand with knives. When the clash between the two groups occurred, fearing that the Spanish numerical superiority would prevail, the people stormed the field en masse, forcing the royalists to retreat with everything they had at their disposal.

== Consequences ==
This battle sealed the independence of Amazonas. The province of Chachapoyas, future department of Amazonas, had already been included as part of the free Peruvian territory in the Provisional Regulation dictated by José de San Martín in Huaura on February 12, 1821. It belonged to the then vast department of Trujillo until it was constituted as a departmental jurisdiction by law of November 21, 1832.
