= Elvia Barrios =

Peruvian prosecutor and judge

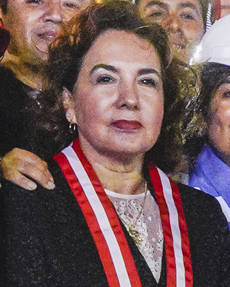
- Barrios in 2022

President of the Supreme Court of Peru
- In office 4 January 2021 – 3 January 2023
- Preceded by: José Lecaros
- Succeeded by: Javier Arévalo Vela

Justice of the Supreme Court of Peru
- Incumbent
- Assumed office 2011

Personal details
- Born: Huancavelica, Peru
- Spouse: Guillermo Thornberry (divorced)
- Relatives: Rocío Barrios (sister)
- Education: National University of San Marcos alumni

Elvia Barrios Alvarado is a Peruvian prosecutor and judge. She is justice of the Supreme Court of Peru since 2011 and was its first woman president between 2021 and 2023.

== Career ==
Barrios was born in Huancavelica, Peru, and graduated from the National University of San Marcos alumni.

In 1984, she became an assistant public prosecutor in Tarapoto and Maynas, before being appointed provincial criminal prosecutor the following year and moving to Ayacucho. In territory controlled by the Shining Path terrorist group, Barrios was tasked with investigating massacres such as those in Puccayacu and Accomarca. For security reasons, she was transferred to Lima in 1987 as a provincial criminal prosecutor, until 1990, when she was appointed senior judge of Ayacucho, a post she held until April 1992, during which time she participated in terrorism trials.

Following 1990 Fujimori’s self-coup, Barrios was dismissed and did not return to her post until the end of the dictatorship in 2001, when she joined the Lima Superior Court of Justice as president of the Criminal Chamber for Prisoners and Those on Parole. From September 2005 until 2008, she was coordinator of the Anti-Corruption System and presided over the Fourth Anti-Corruption Criminal Chamber, hearing cases such as that against Vladimiro Montesinos.

Barrios was appointed provisional justice of the Supreme Court of Peru in 2009, being part of the trial that condemned former President of Peru Alberto Fujimori and became a permanent justice in 2011, becoming the second woman to do so after Elcira Vásquez Cortez. Barrios has presided over the Special Criminal Chamber and the Judiciary’s Gender Justice Commission.

On 3 December 2020, the Plenary Chamber of the Supreme Court, by 11 votes in favour out of 15, appointed her as the first female President of the Supreme Court, and Barrios took office on 4 January 2021. In her inaugural speech, Barrios stated that the COVID-19 pandemic in Peru had highlighted the weaknesses of the judicial system and pledged to tackle corruption, reduce delays in court proceedings and modernise the justice system through digital transformation, with the aim of restoring public confidence. As president, she spearheaded the digital transformation of the justice system, the expansion of the electronic court record system, and defended judicial independence in the face of accusations of “political persecution” levelled by president Pedro Castillo’s inner circle.

After the 2022 self-coup attempt by president Castillo, Barrios immediately rejected Castillo’s announcement that he would dissolve Congress and reorganise the justice system. She stated that the judiciary would not comply with any unconstitutional decision, condemned “all actions that undermine the constitutional order” and called for the rule of law to be upheld.

She was succeeded as president of the Supreme Court on 3 January 2023 by Javier Arévalo Vela.
