= Governorate of Maynas =

Governorate of the Spanish Empire

Governorate of Maynas Gobierno de Maynas
- Governorate of the Spanish Empire
- 1619–1802
- Flag
- Capital: Xeberos
- Historical era: Spanish colonization of the Americas
  - Established: 9 December 1619
  - Disestablished: 15 July 1802
Preceded by	Succeeded by
Mainas missions	General Command of Maynas; 1776: Portuguese Brazil

The Governorate of Maynas (Spanish: Gobierno de Maynas), also known as the Province of Maynas (Spanish: Provincia de Maynas), was one of the provinces established at the eastern part of the Real Audiencia of Quito during the 17th century, first as part of the Viceroyalty of Peru and later as part of the Viceroyalty of New Granada until its reincorporation to Peru through the real cédula of July 15, 1802, as the General Command of Maynas.

== History ==
The first governor of Maynas was Diego Vaca de Vega, who in 1619 obtained the authorization and assistance necessary for the formation of a new government from the Real Audiencia of Quito. On December 9, 1619, the act of founding the city of San Francisco de Borja was signed; In 1634 the foundation was completed and the city council, councilors and other officials were elected. He divided the Maynas Nation into 24 encomiendas. In 1637, the governor of Maynas, Vaca de la Cadena, obtained the first Jesuits from Quito. The priests Cuxia and Cueva were appointed by provision of the Audiencia of Quito, after consultation with the bishop of Quito, as the founders of the Mainas missions with the Curato de Borja as a stopover, where they arrived on February 6, 1638. The Jesuits of Quito began the missions in the governorate and then spread along the Amazon and Ucayali rivers.

In 1656, the governorate, dependent on the Audiencia of Quito, was to include the city of San Francisco de Borja and all the provinces, nations and rivers, where the so-called Quito Jesuits, were founding the missions. By this decision, the governorate included the Ucayali River in a general and indefinite manner, because since previous years the Jesuits had spread along the Ucayali River to the high grasslands whose possession was ratified by King Charles II, according to the real cédula of 1689, which declares:

[...] that the Missions and Reductions of Upper and Lower Ucayali to the pajonales where the conquests of Father Ricter had reached. They belonged to the Jesuit Missionaries of Quito; and the successor king, Count of Monclava ordered that if said Jesuits had been dispossessed, they would immediately be replaced. It is assumed that these sites of the Pajonales are near the junction of the Jauja with the Apurímac, from where it is called Ucayali, at 11 degrees of southern altitude.

Based on the conformity of the facts of the conquest of the missionaries of Quito, the governorate extended over the Ucayali River to the area occupied by the nations of the Campas (or Cambas) Indians, that is, bathed by the Paucartambo, Santa Anna, Urubamba, Apurimac and Jauja, that is, up to the boundaries of the Real Audiencia of Charcas, today Bolivia. The viceroy of Peru not only did not provide help to the Jesuits but was their greatest opponent, so much so that the King of Spain Charles II intervened through the Royal Decree of 1689 in defense of the rights of the Jesuits of Quito and the Presidency of Quito. In 1685 Father Samuel Fritz, who was one of the Quito Jesuits of German origin, had spread throughout the Amazon to near the mouths of the Atlantic Ocean; but he was stripped of his Great Omagua Missions by the Portuguese. In 1698 Father Richter and the clergyman Bárgez were martyred.

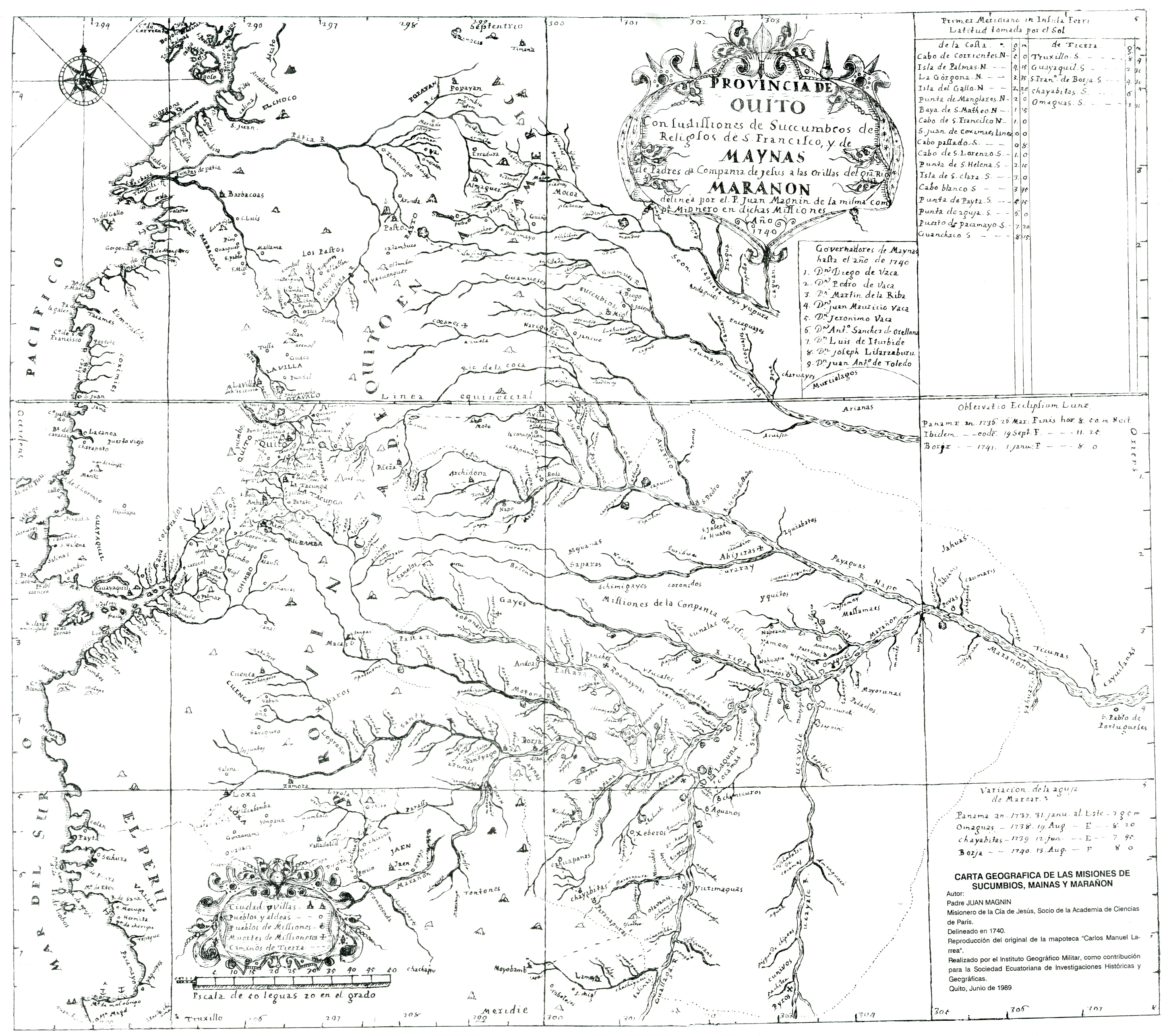
Map of Quito that includes the Franciscan missions in Sucumbíos and those of the Jesuits in Maynas.

In the context of the difficulties in sending religious to the Marañón and the pressures to repatriate them to Europe, the decision was made to intervene from the Court of Madrid. A Father Procurator was in charge of recruiting people, providing them with resources and faculties. Despite the adversities, in September 1684, Father Manuel Rodríguez assigned seven Jesuits to Quito, among whom Juan Gastel of Austria, Samuel Fritz and Enrique Richter of Bohemia stood out. His mission in Marañón, starting in August 1685, focused on carrying out missionary conquests that surpassed the previous ones. The Jesuits faced challenging conditions, such as isolation, the tropical climate, and hostility from the local population. Juan Gastel was sent to Borja, Samuel Fritz to the Omaguas mission in the Amazon, and Enrique Richter to the Alto Ucayali Reductions. The Jesuit missions in Maynas, at the end of the 17th century and beginning of the 18th century, housed more than a thousand people, but climatic difficulties, diseases, isolation and the hostility of the indigenous people hindered their development, despite the efforts of the missionaries from Quito, Cuenca and Loja. Comparatively, these Amazonian missions faced greater challenges compared to the Jesuit missions among the Guaraní, whose populations ranged between 36,000 and 141,000 people between 1643 and 1732, respectively.

On December 12, 1744, upon the death of the governor of Toledo, the Jesuits obtained from the Presidency of Quito the suppression of the Maynas governorate. A senior justice, Francisco Matías de Rioja, was chosen for Borja. This provision was approved by the viceroy of New Granada on November 28, 1746, and by the king of Spain in 1748. In 1745 a Royal Provision ordered: "that the jurisdiction of the Napo River be added to the Government of Quijos" that is, reincorporate to Quijos the territory of lower Napo that belonged to it through a cédula. On May 1, 1754, according to Basabé's Report, Maynas was only a possession and the territory of Bajo Napo was reincorporated into the Government of Quijos. The Royal Decree of September 2, 1772 provided:

[...that] those currently serving cease the exercise of the three Governments of Borja, Quijos and Macas, subrogating themselves to those that I (the King) will appoint [...] whose Governors will be responsible for corresponding with each other, reciprocally communicating everything what was offered to them and seemed important to that end. It is consulted on the subordination of these Governors to a Governor General to establish themselves in Pebas or another place on purpose to prevent the Portuguese invasions [...] and that the Bishopric of Quito place a Vicar General in La Laguna

It is known that as a consequence of the Esquilache Riots, it was decided to expel the Jesuits, something that affected the missions that were deployed in this governorate. Regarding the expulsion, there is testimony about the journey and the adventures that the Jesuits had to endure towards Europe, especially those who were in the missions, such as that documented through a letter from missionary Javier Crespo to Spanish functionary José Diguja.

As a consequence of this, in 1773 the king of Spain appointed Juan Francisco Goméz de Arce governor of Maynas. On February 15, 1779, the Council studied the project of erecting "an episcopal village in the City of Huánuco", "whose jurisdiction would embrace the entire border of those mountains of Tarma de Cajamarquilla...; it was resolved to consult if it was not of the case to be established "by placing a Bishop who has residence in the City of Borja [...] report whatever is offered and appears." The Royal Decree of July 12, 1790 ordered the Maynas Missions to be handed over to the Franciscans of Quito.

On March 24, 1794, Calvo's appointment clearly and explicitly distinguished the military government from the political government. In 1802 by Royal Decree, the governorate of Maynas was segregated from the Viceroyalty of New Granada and formed an integral part of the Viceroyalty of Peru with which, after the Peruvian War of Independence, it became part of the territory of the Protectorate of Peru and its subsequent republic, being the focus of a longstanding dispute between the governments of Peru and Ecuador until the signing of the Brasilia Presidential Act in 1998.

== List of governors ==
The following is a list of governors (gobernadores) since 1715:

- 1716: Luis de Itúrbide
- 1736: Juan Antonio de Toledo
- 1768: Joseph Antonio de Larrazabal
- 1765: Antonio de la Peña
- 1773: Juan Francisco Gómez de Arce
- 1778: Ramón García de León y Pizarro
- 1784: Francisco de Requena
- 1793: Juan Tomás de Córdova
- 1794: Diego Calvo
- 1809: Antonio Rafael Alvarez
- 1812: Tomás Costa Romero
- 1814: José Noriega
- 1819: José Rafael Caraveo

== See also ==
- Ecuadorian–Peruvian territorial dispute
