= José Lecaros =

Peruvian magistrate (1951–2024)

José Lecaros (22 April 1951 – 24 November 2024) was a Peruvian magistrate. He was justice from 2007 to 2024 and president of the Supreme Court and the Judiciary from 2019 to 2021, when was succeeded by Elvia Barrios, the first woman to hold the office.

Lecaros was born Arequipa. He died in Lima on 24 November 2024, at the age of 73.
