= Department of Loreto =

Department of Peru

Loreto
- Department
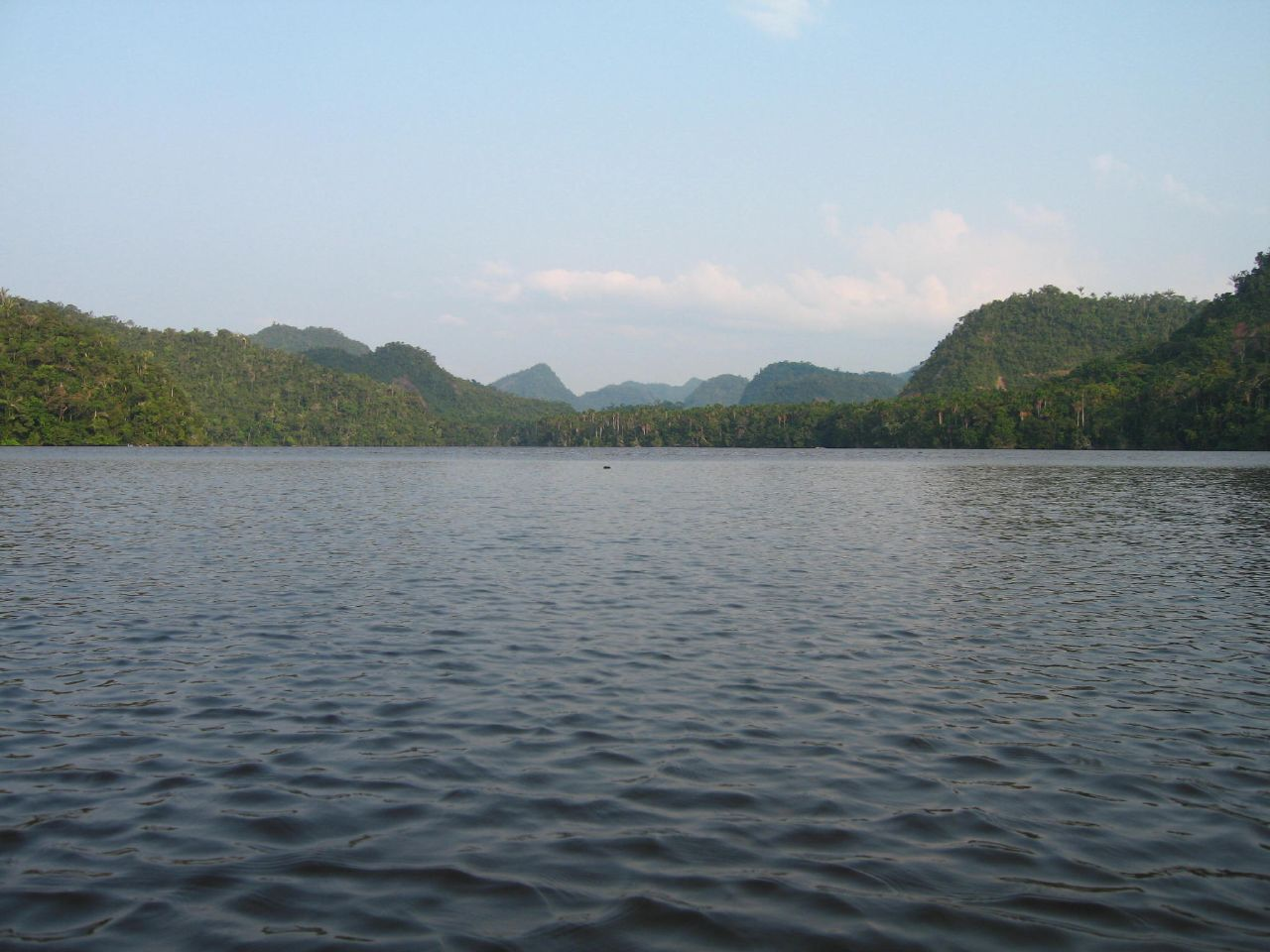
- Pisqui river and Manashahuemana hills

- Flag Coat of arms

- Location of Loreto within Peru
- Interactive map of Loreto
- Coordinates: 4.0°S 74.32°W
- Country: Peru
- Established: 1853
- Capital: Iquitos
- Provinces: List: Alto Amazonas; Datem del Marañón; Loreto; Mariscal Ramón Castilla; Maynas; Requena; Ucayali; Putumayo

Government
  - Type: Regional Government
  - Governor: Jorge René Chávez Silvano

Area
  - Total: 368,851.95 km^{2} (142,414.53 sq mi)
- Highest elevation: 220 m (720 ft)
- Lowest elevation: 70 m (230 ft)

Population (2023)
  - Total: 1,027,559
  - Density: 2.785830/km^{2} (7.215268/sq mi)
- Demonym(s): Loretan; (loretano/a
- UBIGEO: 16
- Dialing code: 065
- ISO 3166 code: PE-LOR
- Principal resources: Rice, cassava, wood, fruit trees, rubber and cebu cattle
- Poverty rate: 24.9%
- Percentage of Peru's GDP: 2.51%
- Website: www.regionloreto.gob.pe

Loreto (Spanish pronunciation: [loˈɾeto]) is a department of Peru. Covering almost one-third of Peru's territory, it is Peru's largest and northernmost department, occupying a large part of the country's portion of the Amazon rainforest. Slightly smaller than Japan or Germany, it is also one of the most sparsely populated regions due to its remote location in the region. Its capital is Iquitos.

Its territory was once part of the General Command of Maynas, a subdivision of the Spanish Empire created in 1802. The overlapping claims over the region following the Spanish American wars of independence was the genesis for two different territorial disputes between Peru and its neighbours. The dispute with Colombia lasted until 1934, while the dispute with Ecuador only ended in 1999. Both disputes led to armed conflict in a number of occasions.

The territory of Maynas was first incorporated into Peru as part of the Department of La Libertad until 1825. On November 21, 1832, the Department of Amazonas was created, which included the province. This subdivision was granted autonomy through by a law issued by Ramón Castilla on March 10, 1853, and was ultimately elevated to a department on September 7, 1866.

== History ==
The first settlers in the region expanded through the various eastern slopes of the Andes. Many of these ethnic groups settled in the Purús, Turúa and Yaraví river basins, receiving names different from those of their lineage.

It is hard to determine the number of indigenous peoples in the region when the first European explorers and missionaries arrived. Numbers given by chroniclers indicate that within the first century of contact, 100,000 natives were baptized. Presumably, when the Spanish arrived, the total population was almost 300,000. Later on, however, the natives were afflicted with diseases such as smallpox, malaria, and yellow fever, due to contact with the Spaniards.

=== Spanish period ===
It is argued that upon the arrival of the Spanish in America, various exogenous diseases—such as malaria—spread throughout the Amazon rainforest and the rest of the continent, decimating the indigenous population or at least significantly reducing it. During this period, Francisco de Orellana arrived in the area, departing from the city of Guayaquil on February 4, 1541. After reaching Quito, he reorganized his expedition and advanced into the jungle, navigating the Napo River to its mouth, where he discovered the Amazon River in 1542.

The Spanish Crown failed to impose its dominion in the region as it did in the Andes. The territory was part of the Viceroyalty of Peru from its inception, then became part of the Viceroyalty of New Granada for a period under ten years, before returning to the Viceroyalty of Peru. During its time in Gran Colombia, it was unable to establish de facto control from Quito; even Jesuit, Dominican and Franciscan missionaries departed to evangelize the various ethnic groups from the city of Moyobamba, which belonged to the Royal Audiencia of Lima. During these years, they contributed by opening travel routes and cutting down distances between Indian and Spanish settlements. This ecclesiastical presence was also the only significant Spanish presence in the Amazonian lowlands at that time and even until the founding of the republic. When the missions fell, a long period of relative national neglect followed, encompassing most of the 19th century. What would become Iquitos was founded in the 1750s.

In 1784, the corregimiento system was replaced by that of the intendancies. The area became part of that of Trujillo, divided into seven partidos. In 1802, the General Command of Maynas and Quixos was created through a real cédula, separating it from the Audiencia of Quito and reincorporating it into Peru. The capital of the territory at the time was Moyobamba, and its territory encompassed the area currently part of Loreto, Amazonas, La Libertad and San Martín.

Following the establishment of a Peruvian state in 1821, what would later become the department of Loreto was central to two territorial disputes: one involving Colombia, which ended in 1934, and another one involving Ecuador, which ended in 1999. Maynas seceded from Spain following a 21-month military campaign that concluded in 1823.

=== Republican period ===
The Department of Quijos and Maynas (Spanish: Departamento de Quijos y Maynas) (Note: In addition to this name, used in 1822, it was also known as the Governorate of Maynas (Spanish: Gobernación de Maynas). In 1824, it was called the Province of Maynas (Spanish: Provincia de Maynas),) was established through a Supreme Decree on April 26, 1822. Prior to its creation, its territory had been administered by the department of Trujillo. Its capital was Moyobamba. It was the site of a pro-Royalist sublevation following its establishment in 1822, which ultimately failed as Moyobamba was again occupied by troops of the Peruvian Army headed by José Nicolás Arriola on September 25. Shortly after the rebellion was suppressed, its first governor was named.

Maynas was administered with ambiguity and without a clear political demarcation due to the confusion caused by the uti possidetis agreement of 1810. In Republican Peru, the name simply referred to an area mentioned by Torre Tagle's decree that mentioned a population of 15,000 people which allegedly had produced a deputy to represent them at the first Congress of the country. During its existence, it was administered by a total of two governors:

- Damián Yépez (1822–1824)
- Damián Najar (1824–1825), sergeant major.

Its territory was reincorporated into the department of Trujillo in 1825. At the time, Carlos del Castillo had been appointed as deputy representing the province within the department in Congress.

In 1828, the territorial dispute over the territory led to a full-scale war between Peru and Colombia. This had been preceded by the official visit of Joaquín Mosquera in 1822, where he requested that Peru return Maynas to Colombia. On July 25, 1824, the Congress of Gran Colombia passed a territorial division law, intending to include the Canton of Quijos within the province of Pichincha in the department of Quito, according to its boundaries at the time of the creation of the Viceroyalty of New Granada. It also intended to incorporate the provinces of Jaén de Bracamoros and Maynas into the department of Azuay.

On November 1, 1832, the territory made up of the provinces of Chachapoyas and Maynas were separated from the department of La Libertad to form the department of Amazonas, whose prefecture headquarters was established in the city of Chachapoyas. The province of Maynas was separated from the prefecture of Amazonas on March 10, 1853. On April 15, it was renamed the Provincia Fluvial de Loreto and, on July 7, 1857, Moyobamba was made the capital of Loreto province. In 1961, it was made a Maritime and Military Government (Spanish: Departamento Marítimo y Militar).

On September 7. 1866, the department was created, with its capital in Moyobamba. During the late 19th century, the rubber boom led to a 25-year period of prosperity, as the area was the centre of worldwide interest at the time. The city of Iquitos prospered as one of the most important centres of latex export at the expense of the department's capital, Moyobamba. Additionally, the feeling of abandonment by the Peruvian government, as well as threats from neighbouring countries had contributed to the development of a feeling of disconnect from the rest of Peru among the local population. During the electoral campaign during the 1895 Peruvian presidential election, candidate Nicolás de Piérola had expressed his support in implanting the federalist system in the country. However, after becoming the president, Piérola had supported the centralist system instead. These events eventually led to the locals revolting against the government in 1896.

=== First insurgent period ===
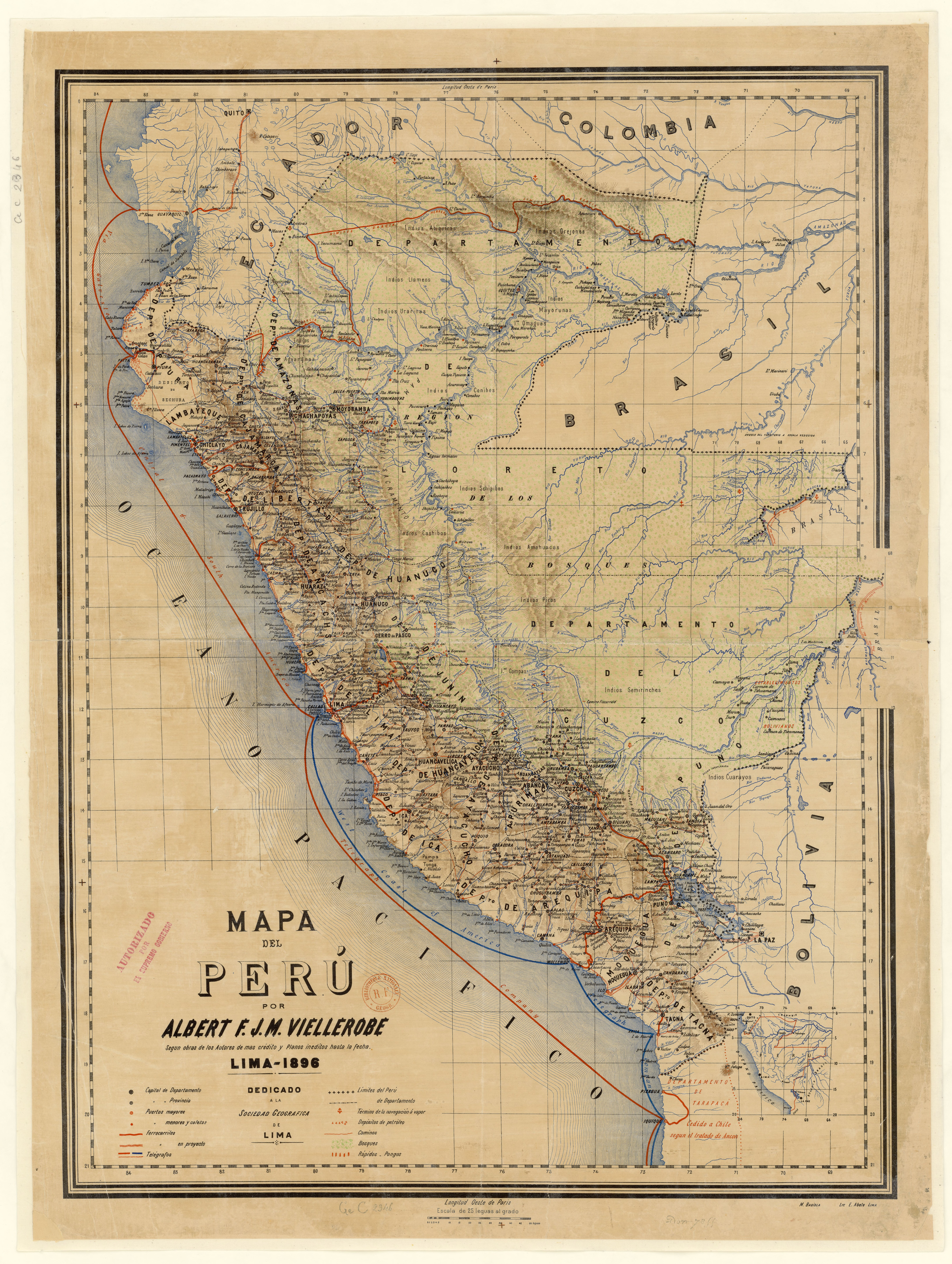
Peru in 1896.

The Federal State of Loreto (Spanish: Estado Federal de Loreto) was the unrecognised government body proclaimed by insurrect locals, with Iquitos as its capital. Its goal was to gain more autonomy for the region as well as to reform Peru into a federal state. The proclamation was made on May 2, 1896, by colonel Ricardo Seminario y Aramburú and soldier Mariano José Madueño. On May 8, the state had signed a provisional constitution, which stated that it was an integral part of Peru, subject to its constitution. By June 2, the movement had spread to the cities of Yurimaguas and Moyobamba. Following that, political organizations and public offices were established in those cities.

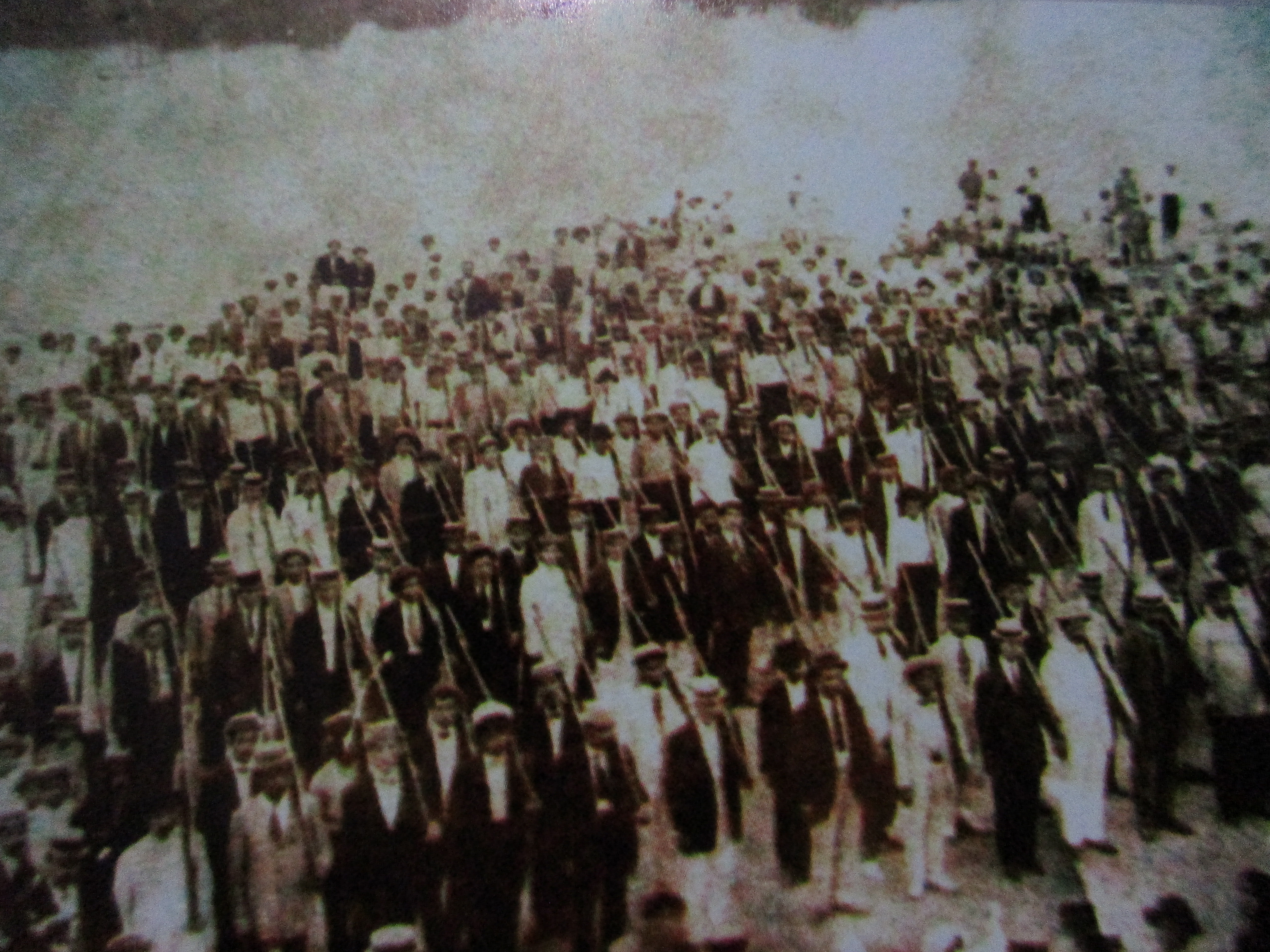
Loretan insurrects in 1896.

News about the proclamation reached Lima on May 18, 1896. The information came from Rio de Janeiro, being relayed through Pará. Piérola ordered the rerouting of three expeditions to counterattack the insurgents. The two of them were land campaigns. One—led by army colonels Eduardo Jessup and Emilio Vizcarra—travelled from Chiclayo to Cajamarca, following the river to reach Moyobamba. Another one travelled by railway and then by boat on the Pichis River. The third expedition of 292 men, had traveled on board of the gunboat Constitución, crossing the Strait of Magellan and then entering the Amazon River on 29 June. The last expedition didn't arrive on time. The insurgent forces lacked local support and were defeated by the land expeditions on July 10, 1896. On July 16, it had been reported in Lima that the leaders of the rebellion had fled the country.

Following the insurrection, colonel Vizcarra was appointed as the prefect of the department. Its capital was Moyobamba. He slowly began to adapt the local pro-regional views that had led to the insurrection. In 1897, the Department of San Martín was created, with Iquitos becoming Loreto's new political capital.

=== Second insurgent period ===
The Jungle Nation (Spanish: Nación Selvática), also known as the Jungle Republic (Spanish: República Selvática), was proclaimed by colonel Vizcarra on May 22, 1899, who then acquired the title of the Supreme Leader. His political campaign had been financed by businessman Juan Jiménez Pimentel. In response, President Eduardo López de Romaña ordered colonel Teobaldo Gutiérrez to siege the southern territory of the self-proclaimed state. The reaction of the neighbouring countries of Brazil, Colombia, and Ecuador, was indifferent.

On February 27, 1900, while on a tour across Loretan cities to appoint new authorities, Vizcarra got involved in a civil revolt at the main square in Moyobamba in response to the abuse carried out by his militias against the local population. During the fighting, the supreme leader was lethally hit with a rock in the head, by a woman with the surname Tapullima. Following his death, the state had fallen a few days later and has been reincorporated into Peru.

=== Third insurgent period ===
Peru in 1910.

The Third Federal State of Loreto was proclaimed in 1921 as a federated state within Peru by Army captain Guillermo Cervantes Vásquez. The proclation was a response to the region's perceived neglect by the government, in both trade and its intent of ceding cerritory to Colombia. Cervantes had previously participated in a conflict against Colombia in 1911. The provisional government, headed in Iquitos, soon expanded its control to Amazonas and San Martín.

On its second day of existence, after it withdrew twenty-thousand Peruvian pounds, the rebel authorities authorized the distribution of provisional banknotes made out of cardboard used by locals as currency. Martial law and a curfew were declared, and local ports were ordered shut, with local trade and navigation being tightly controlled. The revolution was quickly accepted by the local population, but was met negatively by President Augusto B. Leguía, who sent a few troops to the area, and shut down trade to the region. The local guerrillas' military inferiority soon became apparent, and by early 1922, a famished Iquitos had been occupied by Peruvian troops headed by captain Genaro Matos, while Cervantes had escaped on January 9, seeking refuge in the Ecuadorian jungle and with his army soon becoming little more than an insurgent force.

=== Contemporary period ===
The rubber boom ended during the early 20th century. During this period, atrocities were committed against local Natives.

In late 1932, a civilian takeover of the port of Leticia in response to the 1922 border agreement led to an undeclared war between Colombia and Peru. Similarly, Ecuadorian claims over the region led to a full-scale war in 1941.

In 1964, the Peruvian government bombed Matsés communities in Loreto due to clashes with anti-government protestors belonging to the community.

In 1980, the province of Coronel Portillo was separated from Loreto to form the Department of Ucayali.

On December 17, 2018, the Congress of the Republic eliminated the exemption from the payment of the IGV (General Sales Tax).

== Geography ==
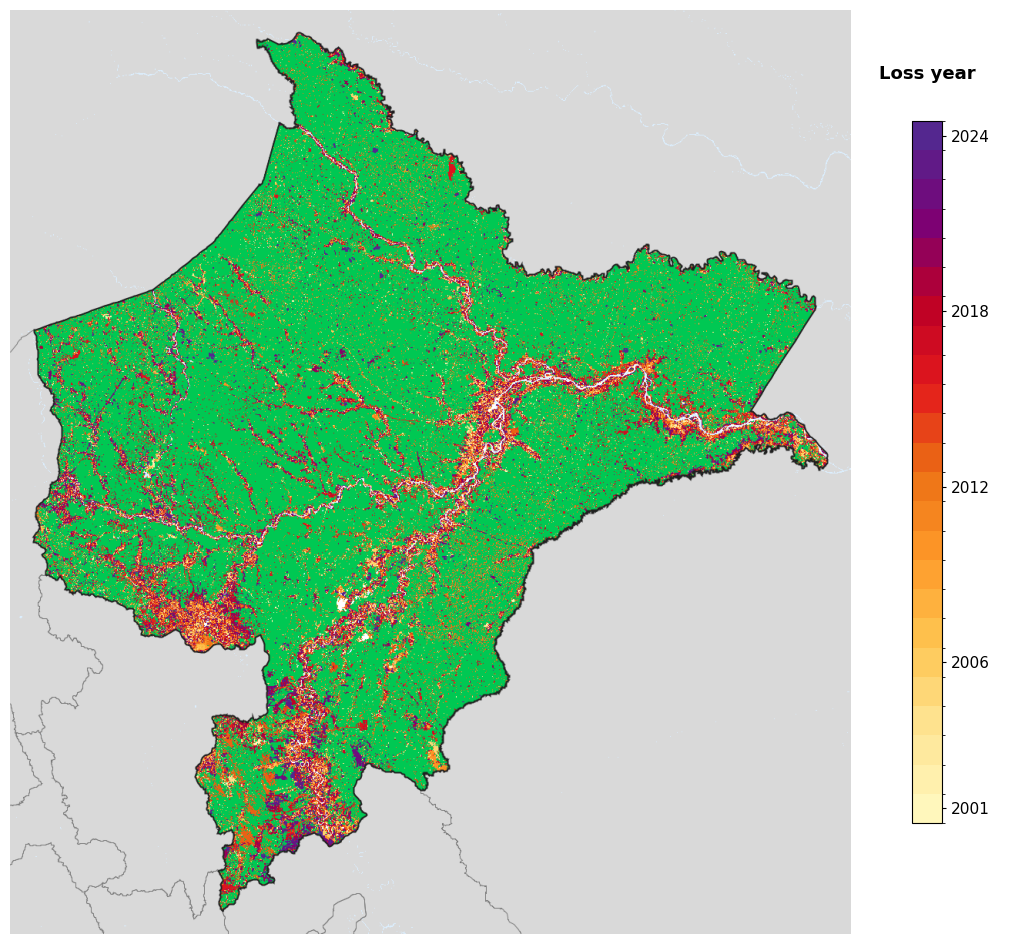
Tree-cover loss year in Loreto, 2001-2024, from the Global Forest Change dataset.

- Northwest: Ecuador: Sucumbíos Province, Orellana Province, Pastaza Province and Morona-Santiago Province
- North: Colombia: Putumayo Department
- Northeast: Colombia: Amazonas Department
- East: Brazil: Amazonas State and Acre State
- South: Ucayali and Huánuco regions
- West: San Martín and Amazonas regions

Loreto's large territory comprises parts of the high and low jungle, and is largely covered with thick vegetation.

This territory has wide river flood plains, which are covered with rainwater and are usually swamped in summer. In these flood areas there are elevated sectors called restingas, which always remain above water, even in times of the greatest swellings. There are numerous lagoons known as cochas and tipishcas, surrounded by marshy areas with abundant grass vegetation.

Numerous rivers cross Loreto's territory, all of which are part of the Amazonian hydrographical system. Most of them are navigable. The main river crossing the region is the Amazon, one of the world's most important rivers. Its numerous curves are always changing and sometimes make for a difficult journey. The width between banks of the Amazon sometimes measures a staggering 4 km (2.5 mi). The Yavari River runs from Peru to Brazil, the Putumayo River serves as part of the border with Colombia, and the Ucayali and Marañón rivers penetrate Loreto after going through the Pongo de Manseriche.

=== Climate ===
The weather is warm and humid with an average temperature of 17 °C (63 °F) to 20 °C (68 °F) during the months of June and July, and up to a high of 36 °C (97 °F) from December through March.

The average humidity level is 84%, with strong rain all year round.

== Politics ==
The department is administered by a regional government based in Iquitos. It is administered by the Catholic Church in Peru as part of the apostolic vicariates of Iquitos, Requena, San José de Amazonas and Yurimaguas.

=== List of governors ===
Since 2023, the regional governor of Loreto is René Chávez Silvano.

=== Subdivisions ===
Map of provinces

The region is divided into eight provinces (provincias, singular: provincia), which are composed of 53 districts (distritos, singular: distrito). The provinces, with their capitals in parentheses, are:

- Alto Amazonas (Yurimaguas)
- Datem del Marañón (San Lorenzo)
- Loreto (Nauta)
- Mariscal Ramón Castilla (Caballococha)
- Maynas (Iquitos)
- Requena (Requena)
- Ucayali (Contamana)
- Putumayo (San Antonio del Estrecho)

Largest cities
#	City	Population
1	Iquitos	476,736
2	Yurimaguas	104,862
3	Nauta	34,702
4	Requena	28,348

== Demographics ==
Loreto is home to many Amazonian indigenous peoples such as the Amhuacas and the Urarina. As of the 2017 Peru Census, 82% of the population identifies as Mestizo, 11.4% identify as other (mostly Amazonian tribes), 2.9% identify as Afro-Peruvian, 2% identify as White, and 1.5% identify as Quechua.

=== Languages ===
According to the 2007 Peru Census, the mother tongue of most of the residents was Spanish (92.51%). The following table shows the mother tongue of the people of the Loreto Region by province:

Province	Quechua	Aymara	Asháninka	Another native language	Foreign language	Deaf or mute	Total
Alto Amazonas	367	16	15	12,811	7	146	95,290
Datem del Marañón	1,736	13	8	20,014	1	43	44,144
Loreto	548	9	8	4,618	1	79	56,058
M. Ramón Castilla	497	30	13	4,411	38	44	49,116
Maynas	2,612	140	80	4,466	266	427	454,800
Requena	29	6	16	1,449	-	64	59,125
Ucayali	101	15	24	5,748	5	55	55,783
Total	5,890	229	164	53,517	318	858	814,316
%	0.72	0.02	0.03	6.57	0.04	0.11	100.00

Ethnicities

== Culture ==
=== Festivities ===
- First week of January. Anniversary of Iquitos. Week-long festivities to celebrate the founding of the city.
- Third week of February. Carnivals.
- June 24. Fiesta de San Juan. The local people go to the Nanay and Amazonas river banks, taking with them the traditional juanes, cooked on the eve. In front of the waters, they merrily drink and dance.
- First two weeks of August. A farm, livestock and crafts fair takes place in the small town of Santa Clara de Nanay, located 14 kilometres (8.7 mi) from the city of Iquitos.
- September 7. Señora de la Natividad. Date in which the Tamshiyacu people, in the province of Maynas, honor their patron.
- December 8. Fiesta de la Purísima, celebrated in the district of Punchana, located 3 kilometres (1.9 mi) from Iquitos

=== Gastronomy ===
The typical dishes in Loreto are very similar to those of other places in the Amazon region. Motelo or turtle meat soup and juanes (rice tamales with chicken or fish) are typical Loretan dishes. Vendors in the local markets offer fried or steamed monkey or lizard meat considered delicious according to the local people.

Other typical dishes include cecina (dried and smoked pork), tacacho (coal cooked bananas, pork, and chopped onions), chonta salad, palometa (fish soup), carachama (fish) and paiche (a large fish). Among desserts there is a refreshing aguaje ice cream.

To drink, they serve masato (a beer made of cassava) or natural fruit juices such as aguaje, maracuyá (passion fruit), and cocona (Solanum sessiliflorum).

== Landmarks ==
- Allpahuayo-Mishana National Reserve
- Pucacuro Reserved Zone
- Pacaya-Samiria National Reserve

== See also ==
- Peruvian Amazon
- Iquitos
- Yurimaguas
- Nauta
