= General Command of Maynas =

Administrative district of the Spanish Empire

General Command of Maynas Comandancia General de Maynas
- Governorate and General Command of the Spanish Empire
- 1802–1822
- Flag

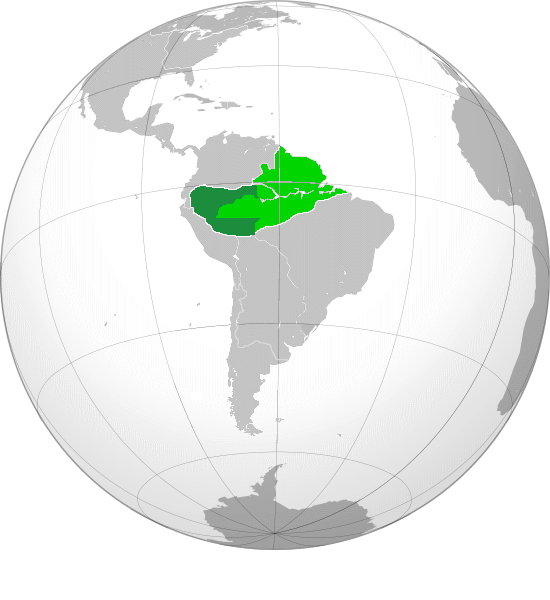
- Map with controlled (green) and claimed (light green) territory
- Capital: Moyobamba
- Historical era: Viceroyalty of Peru
  - Established: 15 July 1802
  - War of Independence: 1821–1822
  - Supreme Decree: 26 April 1822
Preceded by	Succeeded by
Governorate of Maynas	Department of Quijos and Maynas

The General Command of Maynas (Note: Spanish: Comandancia general de Maynas / Gobierno y comandancia general de Maynas. Translations in English vary, with General Command being used, but also translated as the General Commandery of Maynas) was a governorate and general command of the Spanish Empire that existed from 1802 to 1822. It replaced the governorates of Quijos and Maynas, excluding the latter's village of Papallacta.

== History ==
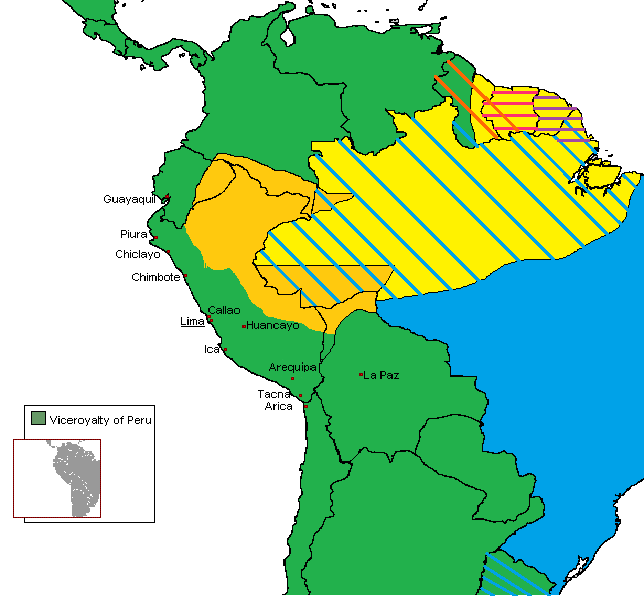
The area (in mustard) c. 1802.

The territory was created through the real cédula of July 15, 1802, which transferred the governorates of Maynas and Quijos (excluding the village of Papallacta) into the Viceroyalty of Peru. It was incorporated into the Protectorate of Peru as a department with the name of Quijos and Maynas following a war for the territory's independence that lasted from 1821 to 1822, during the Spanish American wars of independence. The aforementioned department was ultimately incorporated into the Department of Trujillo in 1825.

After the wars of independence in Ecuador and Peru, the zone became extremely relevant for both countries, as it was a main focus of the Ecuadorian–Peruvian territorial dispute, which escalated in 1941 as the Ecuadorian–Peruvian War and continued to a lesser extent with skirmishes in 1995 and in 1998, the latter leading to the signing of the Brasilia Presidential Act in 1998. Additionally, it was also a focus of the territorial dispute between Colombia and Peru that escalated in 1933 with the Colombia–Peru War which concluded with the signing of the Rio Protocol the following year.

== Areas that belonged to Maynas ==
=== Peru ===
- Department of Loreto, Peru
- Department of Ucayali, Peru
- Department of San Martín, Peru

== See also ==
- Ecuadorian–Peruvian territorial dispute
- Colombian–Peruvian territorial dispute
