= Borja, Peru =

Settlement in Loreto Region, Peru

Borja
- Settlement
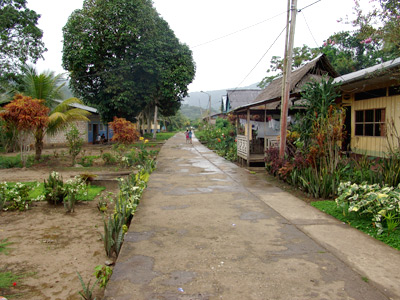
- A street in Borja

- Location within Peru
- Coordinates: 4.470°S 77.548°W
- Country: Peru
- Region: Loreto
- Province: Datem del Marañón Province
- Established: 1619
- Elevation: 165 m (541 ft)

Population (2017)
  - Total: 329

Borja is a settlement in the Datem del Marañón Province of the Loreto Region of Peru. The hamlet is located on the banks of the Marañón River at an elevation of 165 m (541 ft). In 2017 the population was 329. Established in 1619, Borja was one of the first settlements of Spanish colonists in the Amazon lowlands of Peru. Borja became a Roman Catholic mission of the Jesuit Order in 1638. Because of European diseases and enslavement of the indigenous Maina and other ethnic groups, the population of Borja and its vicinity declined from about 3,000 in 1638 to a few hundred by the late 18th century.

== History ==
The first Spaniard known to have been in the Borja region was Juan de Salinas y Loyola who came this way in 1557, floating down the Marañón River through the tumultuous waters of the Pongo de Manseriche, a water gap, that marks the end of the Andes highlands and the beginning of the flat, forested upper Amazon Basin. The site of Borja is 2 km (1.2 miles) past the Pongo and was inhabited at that time by the Mainas people, one of many ethnic groups living in the region.

In 1619, the settlement of Borja was founded by Diego Baca de Vega from Loja, Ecuador. It was one of the first Spanish settlements in the lowlands of the Amazon Basin. Borja was named for the viceroy of Peru, Francisco de Borja y Aragón. The indigenous population of the Borja region was the Maina people who numbered at that time three or four thousand. Twenty-one Spaniards and mestizos were awarded encomiendas (a right to compel the labor of the indigenous people) by the colonial government and forced the indigenous people (Indians or Indios) to work on Spanish farms. Many of the Maina died of disease or overwork or escaped the encomiendas. In 1635, the Maina revolted and were severely repressed.

When Jesuit missionaries arrived in 1638 the population consisted of about 2,800 Maina and other ethnic groups and about 200 Spaniards, including a small military garrison. Borja was the Spanish administrative center of a region that was called Mainas. The population of Borja was only sustained by frequent expeditions into the jungle by the missionaries, soldiers, and Christian Indians to capture Maina and other peoples and force them to return to or settle in Borja. Nevertheless, the population continued to decline and in 1661 was only 1,000. In 1776, the population was 263 indigenous people and 152 Spanish and mestizos. Jesuit missionaries established missions among a multitude of different ethnic groups in an area as large as Spain. Most of the missions they established were ephemeral.

Borja was isolated. Links with the highland areas of Peru were often through the town of Jaen, 210 km (130 miles) southwest in straight line distance. In 1743, travel between the two settlements still required, at the most favorable times, four days by road and 2 and one-half days floating down the Marañón, passing through the dangerous Pongo. In times of high water, the river was not navigable, and Borja was isolated. Borja produced small amounts of tobacco and achiote for trade with Jaen.
