= Nóvita =

Coordinates: 4°57′N 76°37′W

- Municipality and town
- Flag

- Location of the municipality and town of Nóvita in the Chocó Department of Colombia.
- Country: Colombia
- Department: Chocó Department
- Elevation: 66 m (217 ft)

Population
  - Total: 7,867
- Time zone: UTC-5 (Colombia Standard Time)

Nóvita is a municipality and town in the Chocó Department, Colombia.

It was the first capital of Chocó Province. It was a traditional center for gold mining, Many of its residents are Afro-Colombians.

In the 1850s, supplies, and possibly even people, were brought to the town by porters due to "the mountainous terrain, very high rainfall, and many rivers" of the surrounding region.

== Climate ==
Nóvita has an extremely wet tropical rainforest climate (Af) with over 9000 mm of rain annually.

Climate data for Nóvita town
Month	Jan	Feb	Mar	Apr	May	Jun	Jul	Aug	Sep	Oct	Nov	Dec	Year
Mean daily maximum °C (°F)	30.2 (86.4)	30.2 (86.4)	30.8 (87.4)	30.6 (87.1)	30.7 (87.3)	30.5 (86.9)	30.8 (87.4)	30.7 (87.3)	30.5 (86.9)	30.0 (86.0)	29.6 (85.3)	29.9 (85.8)	30.4 (86.7)
Daily mean °C (°F)	26.0 (78.8)	26.0 (78.8)	26.5 (79.7)	26.4 (79.5)	26.4 (79.5)	26.2 (79.2)	26.4 (79.5)	26.3 (79.3)	26.2 (79.2)	25.8 (78.4)	25.6 (78.1)	25.9 (78.6)	26.1 (79.1)
Mean daily minimum °C (°F)	21.9 (71.4)	21.9 (71.4)	22.2 (72.0)	22.3 (72.1)	22.2 (72.0)	21.9 (71.4)	22.0 (71.6)	21.9 (71.4)	21.9 (71.4)	21.7 (71.1)	21.7 (71.1)	21.9 (71.4)	22.0 (71.5)
Average rainfall mm (inches)	685.7 (27.00)	665.7 (26.21)	689.2 (27.13)	788.7 (31.05)	808.6 (31.83)	659.9 (25.98)	614.5 (24.19)	816.0 (32.13)	824.0 (32.44)	937.5 (36.91)	930.2 (36.62)	760.1 (29.93)	9,180.1 (361.42)
Average rainy days	19	16	17	18	19	19	18	19	20	21	21	20	227
