= War of Independence of Maynas =

1820–1822 military conflict in South America

Maynas campaign
- Part of the Peruvian War of Independence and the Spanish American Wars of Independence
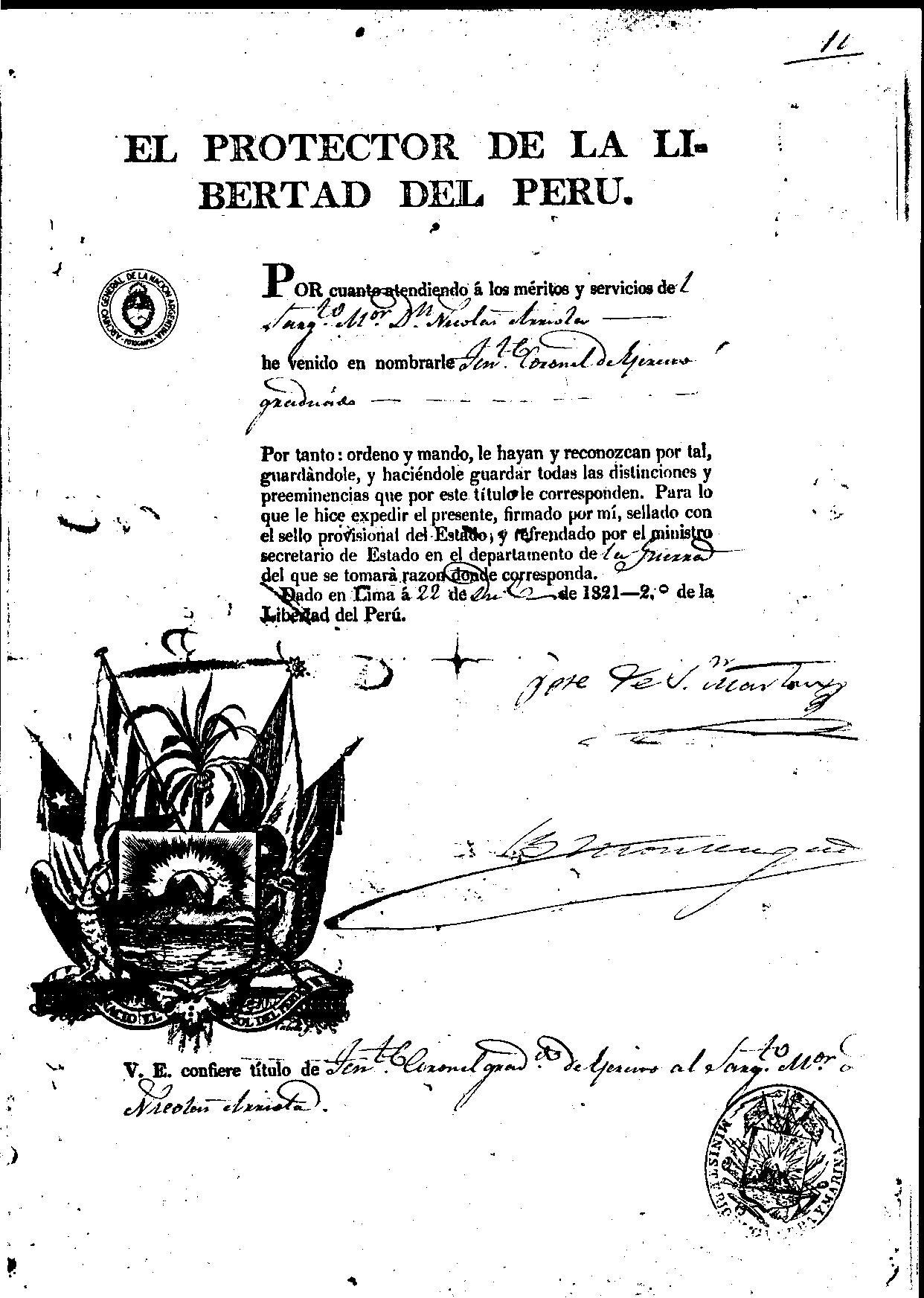
- Peruvian recognition of Maynas' independence
| Date | April 10, 1821 — January 9, 1823 |
| Location | General Command of Maynas |
| Result | Peruvian Patriot victory; The General Command of Maynas was incorporated into Peru in 1822 |

Belligerents
| Maynas rebels (Peru) Peruvian Protectorate (Peru) Peruvian Republic (Note: The war started while the Viceroyalty of Peru was occupied by troops headed by José de San Martín. It became the Protectorate of Peru on July 28, 1821, and then the Peruvian Republic (headed by a military junta from 1822 to 1823).); Supported by: Río de la Plata (Note: Until early 1822) | Spanish Empire: General Command of Maynas; Province of Quito |

Commanders and leaders
| Pedro Pascasio Noriega (executed); Matiaza Rimachi (Note: Also known as Matea Rimachi); Juan Valdivieso; José María Egúsquiza (United Provinces of the Río de la Plata) Nicolás Arriola | (Spain) Manuel F. Álvarez † (Spain) Santiago Cárdenas (executed) (Spain) José María Matos † |

Units involved
| Peruvian Army; Invisible Army; Army of the Andes | Royal Army of Peru |

Casualties and losses
| 200–900 killed | 5,000–8,000+ killed 4,000+ Spaniards executed 1,000 civilians Peruvianized; 5,000+ deported |

The Maynas War of Independence (Spanish: Guerra de Independencia de Maynas), also known as the Maynas War (Spanish: Guerra de Maynas), or Maynas campaign (Spanish: Campaña de Maynas), was an episode of the Spanish American Wars of Independence where the General Command of Maynas declared its independence from the Spanish Empire. It started with the royalist army's takeover of the city of Moyobamba in response to the city's imminent declaration of independence and ended with the capture of the city in 1822.

== Conflict ==
The conflict took place within the Spanish American Wars of Independence. The General Command of Maynas, a territory created under the Spanish Empire, had been preceded by the declarations of independence of the Republic of Colombia (in 1819) and the Protectorate of Peru (in 1821) in its immediate surroundings.

April 10, 1821, had been chosen as the date for Maynas' declaration of independence, although said plans were interrupted when troops of the Royal Army of Peru took over the city of Moyobamba, the capital of the General Command, capturing a number of so-called patriots, such as Pedro Pascasio Noriega, who was executed on the 11th.

In response to the events, José Bernardo de Tagle y Portocarrero, 4th Marquess of Torre Tagle, then intendant of Trujillo, sent troops under the command of Juan Valdivieso (who had previously defeated the royalists at Higos Urco). Once in the city, an armistice was requested to settle on the area's future, with August 10 chosen as the date of independence, although an open cabildo ultimately carried out said proclamation on August 19. On August 17, Governor Manuel Fernández Álvarez asked the opinion of a war council, which decided that the forces would take refuge in Tabatinga, delivering artillery and ammunition to Luso-Brazilian commanders.

The Royal Army carried out a counter-insurgent military campaign that recaptured Moyobamba on May 24, 1822. In response, the 200-men 11th battalion of the Army of the Andes was sent under the command of Nicolás Arriola. Battles took place in La Ventana, Tambo Visitador, Sarandajas, Habana and the Pampa de Higos Urco. The latter two served as a decisive point in the campaign, with the patriot armies successful in their consolidation of Maynas' independence soon after. The battle at Higos Urco also gave San Martín the confidence to take over Lima, proclaiming the independence of Peru on July 28, 1821.

== See also ==
- Spanish American Wars of Independence
- Peruvian War of Independence
