= Papallacta =

Rural parish of Ecuador

Coordinates: 0°22′01″S 78°07′58″W

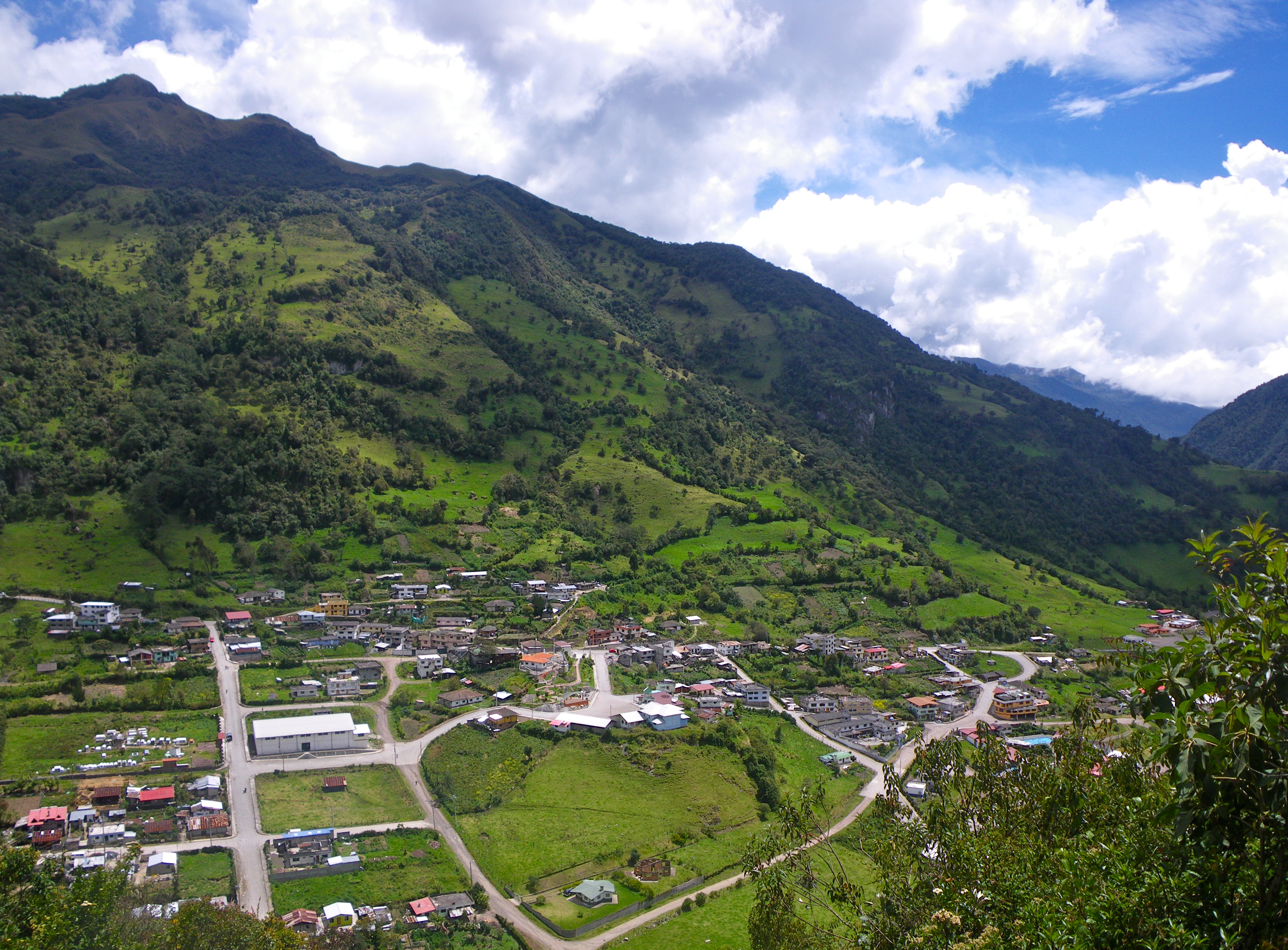
Papallacta, Ecuador on 16 October 2011

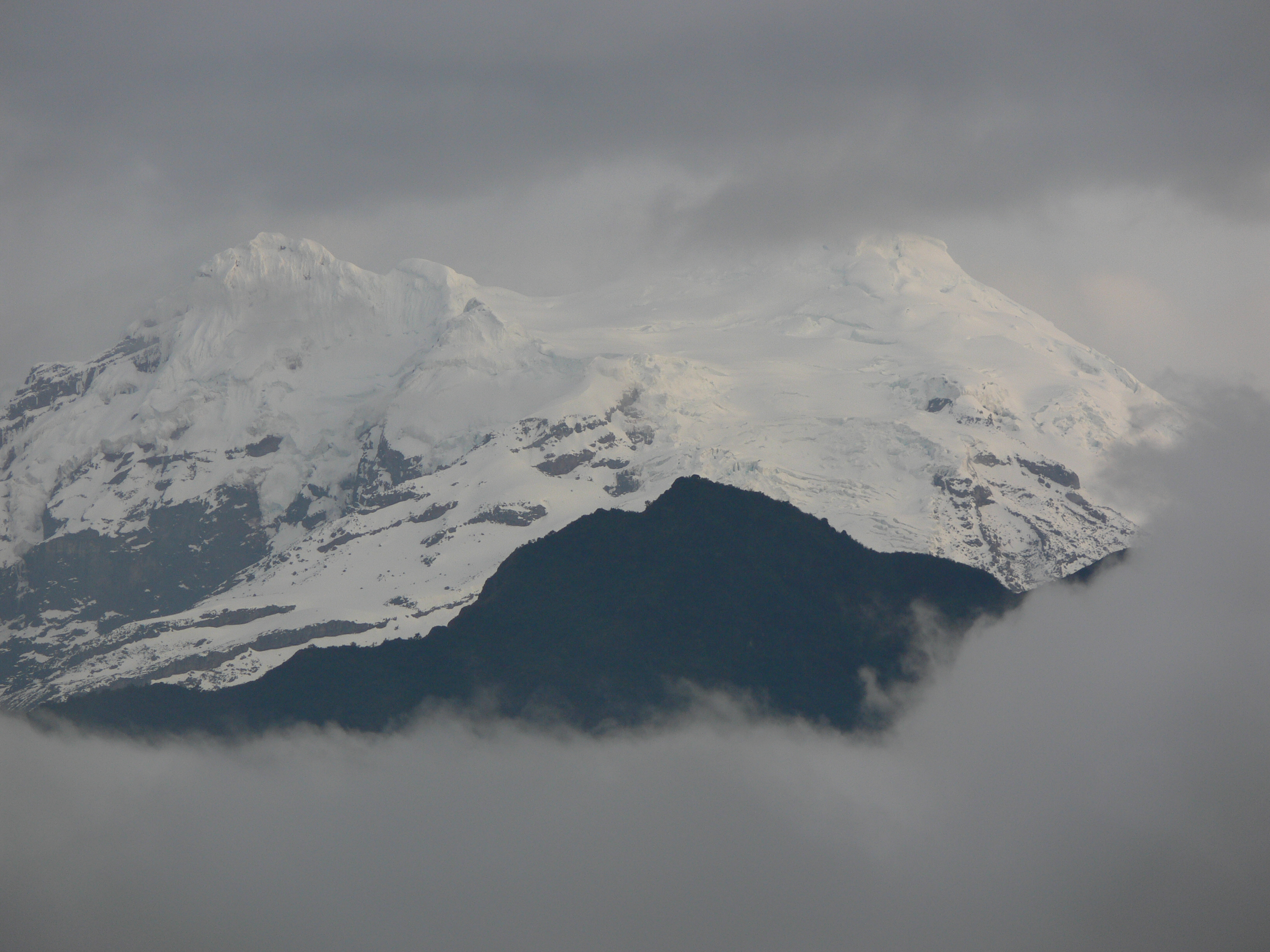
The volcano Antisana seen from the hot spring of Papallacta

Papallacta is a village at an altitude of 3,300 metres (10,827 feet) in Napo Province, Ecuador. Its population is 635 as of 2022.

== Climate ==
Climate data for Papallacta, elevation 3,160 m (10,370 ft), (1971–2000)
Month	Jan	Feb	Mar	Apr	May	Jun	Jul	Aug	Sep	Oct	Nov	Dec	Year
Mean daily maximum °C (°F)	14.4 (57.9)	14.4 (57.9)	13.9 (57.0)	14.2 (57.6)	13.8 (56.8)	12.6 (54.7)	12.0 (53.6)	12.3 (54.1)	13.0 (55.4)	14.6 (58.3)	15.3 (59.5)	14.6 (58.3)	13.8 (56.8)
Mean daily minimum °C (°F)	5.2 (41.4)	5.4 (41.7)	5.8 (42.4)	6.0 (42.8)	6.0 (42.8)	5.3 (41.5)	5.2 (41.4)	5.0 (41.0)	5.1 (41.2)	5.2 (41.4)	5.5 (41.9)	5.2 (41.4)	5.4 (41.7)
Average precipitation mm (inches)	121.0 (4.76)	85.0 (3.35)	107.0 (4.21)	114.0 (4.49)	159.0 (6.26)	163.0 (6.42)	179.0 (7.05)	145.0 (5.71)	123.0 (4.84)	97.0 (3.82)	83.0 (3.27)	71.0 (2.80)	1,447 (56.98)
Average relative humidity (%)	88	91	90	90	91	90	89	88	88	88	88	89	89
Source: FAO

== See also ==
- List of highest towns by country
