= Real cédula =

Legal order of Spain

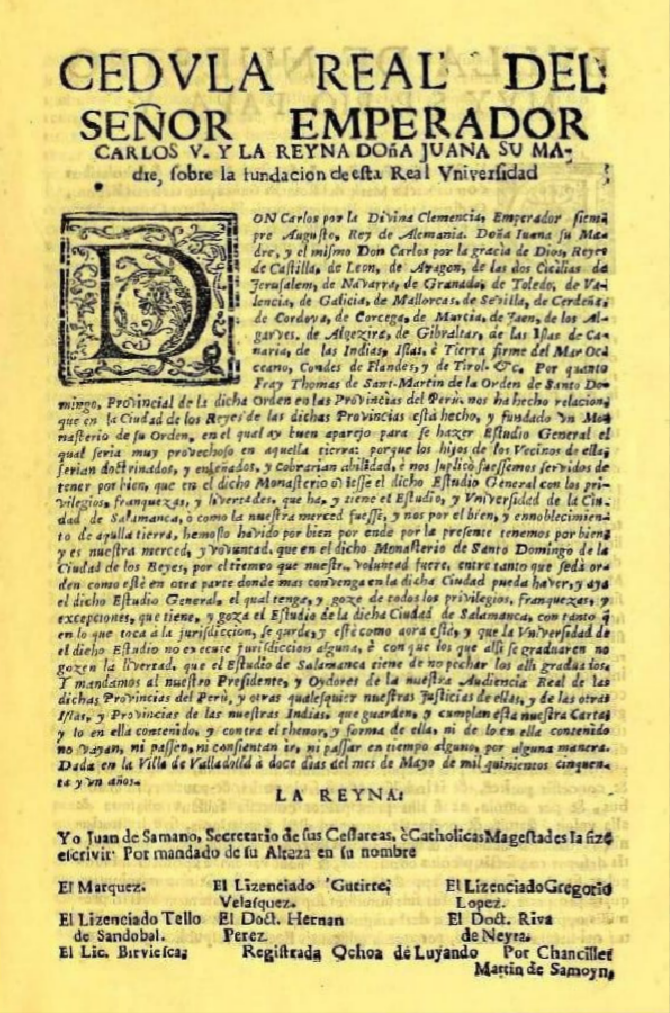
Real cédula authorising the founding of the Royal University of Lima (today San Marcos).

The real cédula (Latin: Regium Diploma; English: royal certificate), also called a real despacho (English: royal dispatch), was, in Spanish law during the ancien régime, a dispatch from the king of Spain, issued by some council or superior court at the request of the king or on his behalf (that is, that is, by decision of the court), in which a favour was granted or some measure was taken. More specifically, the content of the order resolved some conflict of legal relevance, established some guideline of legal conduct, created some institution, appointed some royal position, granted a personal or collective right or ordered some specific action.

Currently, the concept of "royal certificate" still exists in the case of appointments, being a ratification published in the Boletín Oficial del Estado (BOE) of a position historically created by a real cédula, by which a person is appointed. to occupy that position. Reales cédulas that were issued in the past for the founding of certain institutes continue to form part of their statutes, and can be consulted, ratified or transformed to the current constitutional model.

== Description ==
There are two fundamental variants: The reales cédulas de oficio that derive from the administrative function itself, which begin with the name—if it is personalized—or with the positions or titles of the people to whom it is addressed. The other reales cédulas are also granted by the King, but at the request of a party and begin by mentioning the subject of the request and the applicant.

This type of document was used both in Peninsular Spain and in the Spanish overseas dominions—America and the Philippines—in this case with advice in most cases from the Council of the Indies.

The order was headed by the words: El Rey ("The King"), addressed to the recipient of the mandate and ended with the signature: Yo, el Rey ("I, the King"). Since Charles I became emperor of the Holy Roman Empire, his orders usually bore the title of emperor, and, depending on the occasion, they could be issued in the name of the queen consort.

== See also ==
- Royal Decree of Graces of 1815
- Royal Decree (Spain)
- Letters patent
