= Maina people =

Group of indigenous peoples in South America

The Maina or Meena are a group of indigenous peoples living along the north bank of the Marañón River in South America. They spoke, or semi-speak, varieties of the Omurano language. Most Maina speak Urarina today.

The Maina were among the first tribes of the upper Amazon region to have been evangelized by the Catholic Church, leading to the naming of several jurisdictions and areas after the tribe, including the province of Mainas, which included the larger part of the present Ecuador and northern Peru, east of the main Cordillera, including the basins of the Huallaga and Ucayali.

The Maina were one of many older cultures to play with rubber balls as toys. They called it "caucho" which combined the words "caa" (wood) and "ochu" (to cry), made by extracting the sap from a tree they called "heve" and letting it dry into a playable solid that we today call rubber.
