= Córdoba Province =

Córdoba Province may refer to:

- Córdoba Province, Argentina
- Córdoba Province, Colombia
- Province of Córdoba (Spain)
