= Spanish colonization of the Americas =

Flag of Spanish conquistadors with the crown of Castile on a red flag, used by Hernán Cortés, Francisco Pizarro, and others

Spanish (blue) and Portuguese (green) empires in 1790

The Spanish colonization of the Americas began in 1493 on the Caribbean island of Hispaniola (now Haiti and the Dominican Republic) after the initial 1492 voyage of Genoese mariner Christopher Columbus under license from Queen Isabella I of Castile. These overseas territories of the Spanish Empire were under the jurisdiction of Crown of Castile until the last territory was lost in 1898. Spaniards saw the dense populations of Indigenous peoples as an important economic resource and the territory claimed as potentially producing great wealth for individual Spaniards and the crown. Religion played an important role in the Spanish conquest and incorporation of indigenous peoples, bringing them into the Catholic Church peacefully or by force. The crown created civil and religious structures to administer the vast territory. Spanish men and women settled in greatest numbers where there were dense indigenous populations and the existence of valuable resources for extraction.

The Spanish Empire claimed jurisdiction over the New World in the Caribbean and North and South America, with the exception of Brazil, ceded to Portugal by the Treaty of Tordesillas. Other European powers, including England, France, and the Dutch Republic, took possession of territories initially claimed by Spain. Although the overseas territories under the jurisdiction of the Spanish crown are now commonly called "colonies" the term was not used until the second half of 18th century. The process of Spanish settlement, now called "colonization" and the "colonial era" are terms contested by scholars of Latin America and more generally.

It is estimated that during the period 1492–1832, a total of 1.86 million Spaniards settled in the Americas, and a further 3.5 million immigrated during the post-independence era (1850–1950); the estimate is 250,000 in the 16th century and most during the 18th century, as immigration was encouraged by the new Bourbon dynasty. The indigenous population plummeted by an estimated 80% in the first century and a half following Columbus's voyages, primarily through the spread of infectious diseases. Practices of forced labor and slavery for resource extraction, and forced resettlement in new villages and later missions were implemented. Alarmed by the precipitous fall in indigenous populations and reports of settlers' exploitation of their labor, the crown put in place laws to protect their newly converted indigenous vassals. Europeans imported enslaved Africans to the early Caribbean settlements to replace indigenous labor and enslaved and free Africans were part of colonial-era populations. A mixed-race casta population came into being during the period of Spanish rule.

In the early 19th century, the Spanish American wars of independence resulted in the secession of most of Spanish America and the establishment of independent nations. Continuing under crown rule were Cuba and Puerto Rico, along with the Philippines, which were all lost to the United States in 1898, following the Spanish–American War, ending its rule in the Americas.

== Imperial expansion ==
The expansion of Spain's territory took place under the Catholic Monarchs Isabella I of Castile and her husband Ferdinand II of Aragon, whose marriage marked the beginning of Spanish power beyond the Iberian Peninsula. They pursued a policy of joint rule of their kingdoms and created the initial stage of a single Spanish monarchy, completed under the eighteenth-century Bourbon monarchs. The first expansion of territory was the conquest of the Muslim Emirate of Granada on 1 January 1492, the culmination of the Christian Reconquest of the Iberian Peninsula, held by the Muslims since 711. On 31 March 1492, the Catholic Monarchs ordered the expulsion of the Jews in Spain who refused to convert to Christianity. Having departed from the port of Palos de la Frontera on 3 August 1492, on 12 October 1492, Genoese mariner Christopher Columbus and his crew made landfall in the Western Hemisphere, and in 1493 permanent Spanish settlement of the Americas began.

Castile and Aragon were ruled jointly by their respective monarchs, but they remained separate kingdoms. When the Catholic Monarchs gave official approval for the plans for Columbus's voyage to reach "the Indies" by sailing West, the funding came from the queen of Castile. The profits from Spanish expedition flowed to Castile. The Kingdom of Portugal authorized a series of voyages down the coast of Africa and when they rounded the southern tip, were able to sail to India and further east. Spain sought similar wealth, and authorized Columbus's voyage sailing west. Once the Spanish settlement in the Caribbean occurred, Spain and Portugal formalized a division of the world between them in the 1494 Treaty of Tordesillas. The deeply pious Isabella saw the expansion of Spain's sovereignty inextricably paired with the evangelization of non-Christian peoples, the so-called "spiritual conquest" with the military conquest. Pope Alexander VI in a 4 May 1493 papal decree, Inter caetera, divided rights to lands in the Western Hemisphere between Spain and Portugal on the proviso that they spread Christianity. These formal arrangements between Spain and Portugal and the pope were ignored by other European powers, with the French, the English, and the Dutch seizing territory in the Caribbean and in North America claimed by Spain but not effectively settled. Portugal's claim to part of South America under the Treaty of Tordesillas resulted in the creation of Portuguese colony of Brazil. Although during the rule of Charles V, the Spanish Empire was the first to be called "The empire on which the sun never sets", under Philip II the permanent colonization of the Philippine Islands made it demonstrably true.

=== General principles of expansion ===
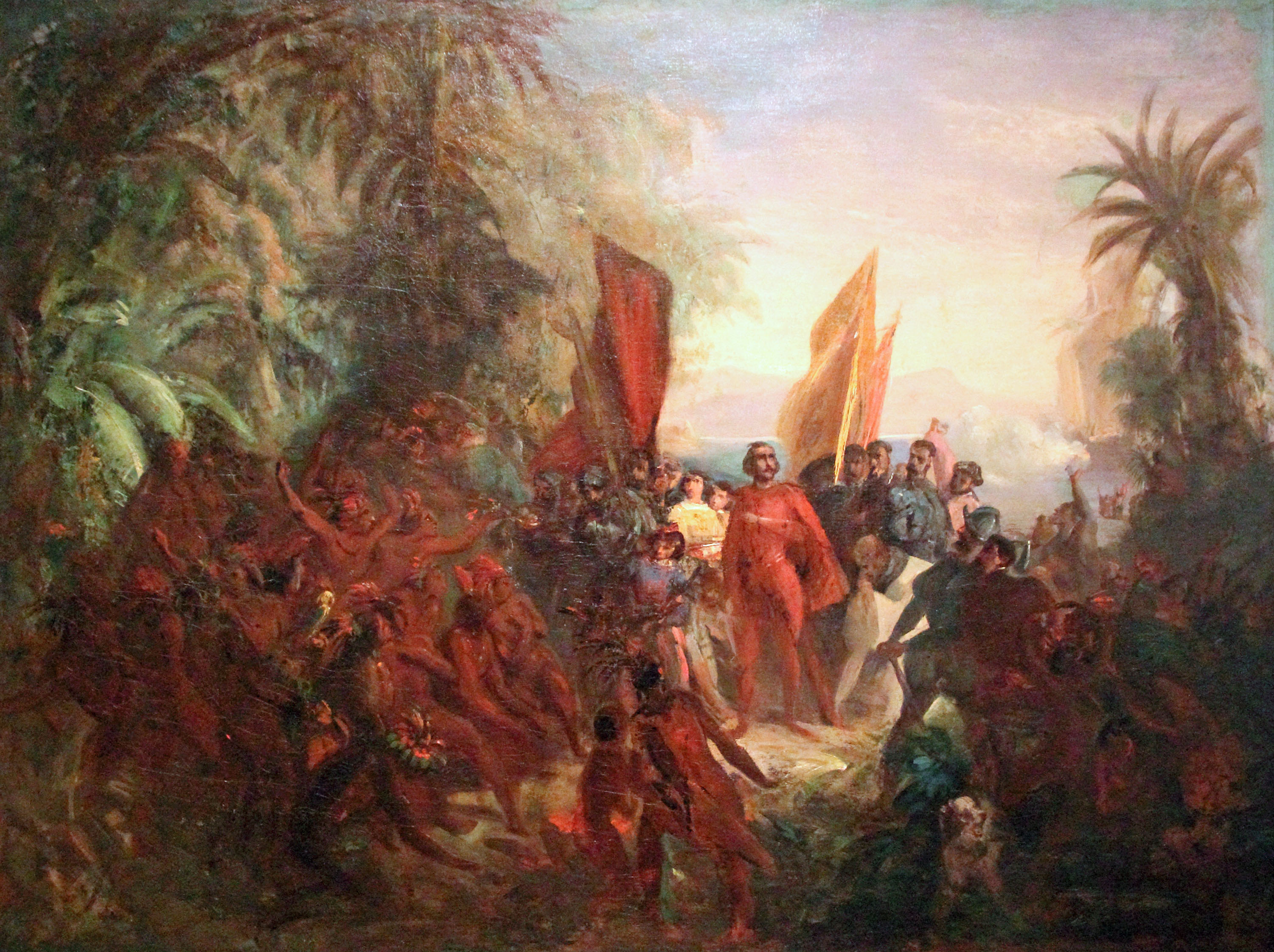
"The Discovery of America" (Johann Moritz Rugendas)

The Spanish expansion has sometimes been succinctly summed up as being motivated by "gold, glory, God", that is, the search for material wealth, the enhancement of the conquerors' and the crown's position, and the expansion of Christianity to the exclusion of other religious traditions. In the extension of Spanish sovereignty to its overseas territories, authority for expeditions (entradas) of discovery, conquest, and settlement resided in the monarchy. Expeditions required authorization by the crown, which laid out the terms of such expedition. Virtually all expeditions after the Columbus voyages, which were funded by the crown of Castile, were done at the expense of the leader of the expedition and its participants. Although often the participants, conquistadors, are now termed "soldiers", they were not paid soldiers in ranks of an army, but rather soldiers of fortune, who joined an expedition with the expectation of profiting from it. The leader of an expedition, the adelantado was a senior with material wealth and standing who could persuade the crown to issue him a license for an expedition. He also had to attract participants to the expedition who staked their own lives and meager fortunes on the expectation of the expedition's success. The leader of the expedition pledged the larger share of capital to the enterprise, which in many ways functioned as a commercial firm. Upon the success of the expedition, the spoils of war were divvied up in proportion to the amount a participant initially staked, with the leader receiving the largest share. Participants supplied their own armor and weapons, and those who had a horse received two shares, one for himself, the second recognizing the value of the horse as a machine of war. For the conquest era, the names of two Spaniards are popularly known because they led the conquests of two indigenous empires, Hernán Cortés, leader of the expedition involved in the conquest of the Aztec Empire, and Francisco Pizarro, leader of the conquest of the Inca in Peru. Spanish conquerors took advantage of indigenous rivalries to forge alliances with groups seeing an advantage for their own goals. This is most clearly seen in the conquest of the Aztec Empire with the alliance of the Nahua city-state of Tlaxcala against the Aztec Empire resulting in lasting benefits to themselves and their descendants.

=== Caribbean islands and the Spanish Main ===
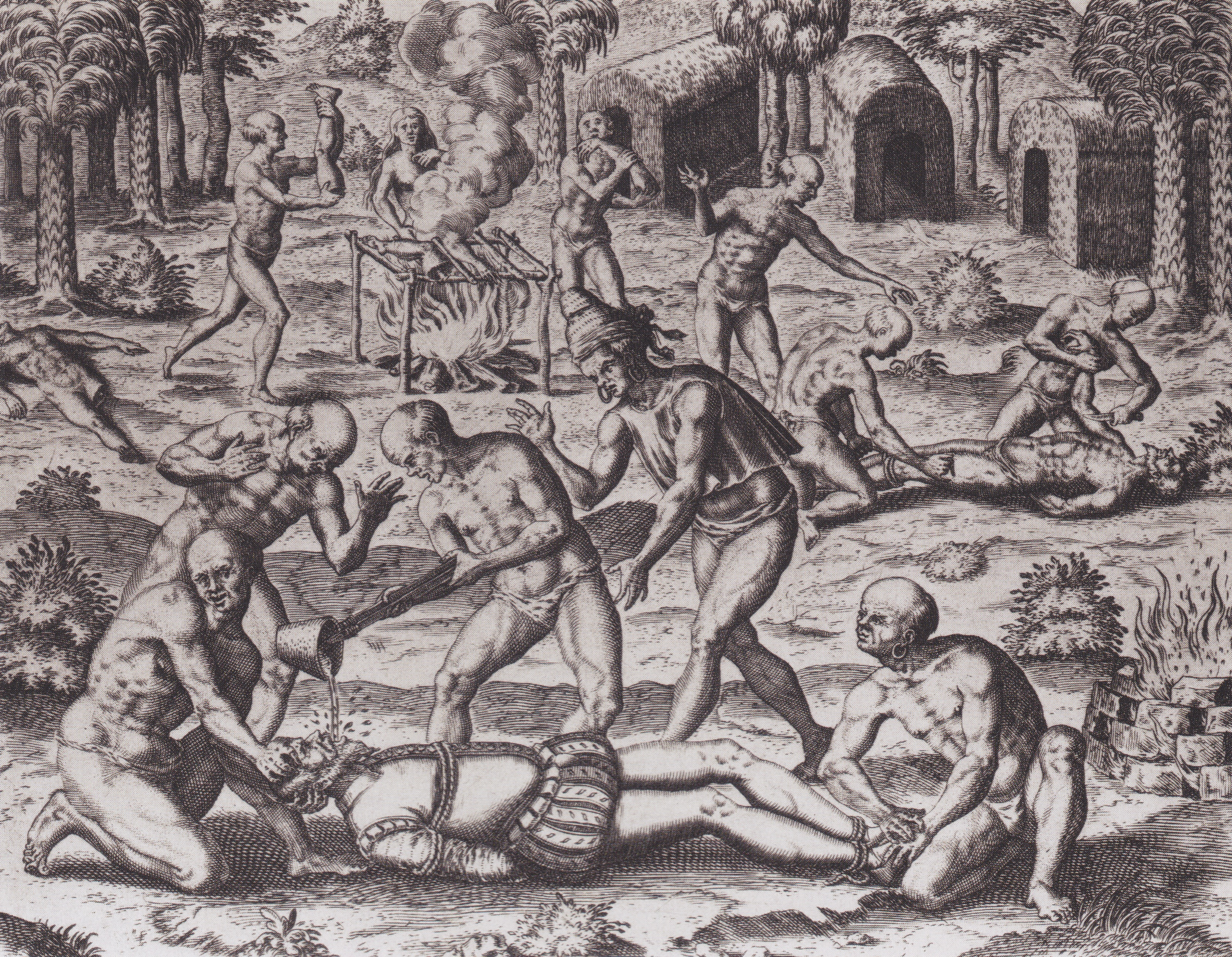
A 16th-century illustration by Flemish Protestant Theodor de Bry for Las Casas' A Short Account of the Destruction of the Indies depicting Taínos fighting back against Spaniards, showing cannibalism and forcing a Spaniard to swallow molten gold

Patterns of the first Spanish settlements in the Caribbean were to endure there and had a lasting impact on the Spanish Empire. Until his dying day, Columbus was convinced that he had reached Asia, the Indies. From that misperception the Spanish called the indigenous peoples of the Americas, "Indians" (indios), lumping a multiplicity of civilizations, groups, and individuals into a single category. The Spanish royal government called its overseas possessions "The Indies" until its empire dissolved in the nineteenth century.

In the Caribbean, because there was no integrated Indigenous civilization such as found in Mexico and Peru, there was no large-scale Spanish conquest of Indigenous peoples, but there was indigenous resistance to Spanish colonization. Columbus made four voyages to the West Indies as the monarchs granted Columbus vast powers of governance over this unknown part of the world. The crown of Castile financed more of his trans-Atlantic journeys, a pattern they would not repeat elsewhere. Effective Spanish settlement began in 1493, when Columbus brought livestock, seeds, and agricultural equipment. The first settlement of La Navidad, a crude fort built on his first voyage in 1492, had been abandoned by the time he returned in 1493. He then founded the settlement of La Isabela on the island they named Hispaniola (now divided into Haiti and the Dominican Republic).

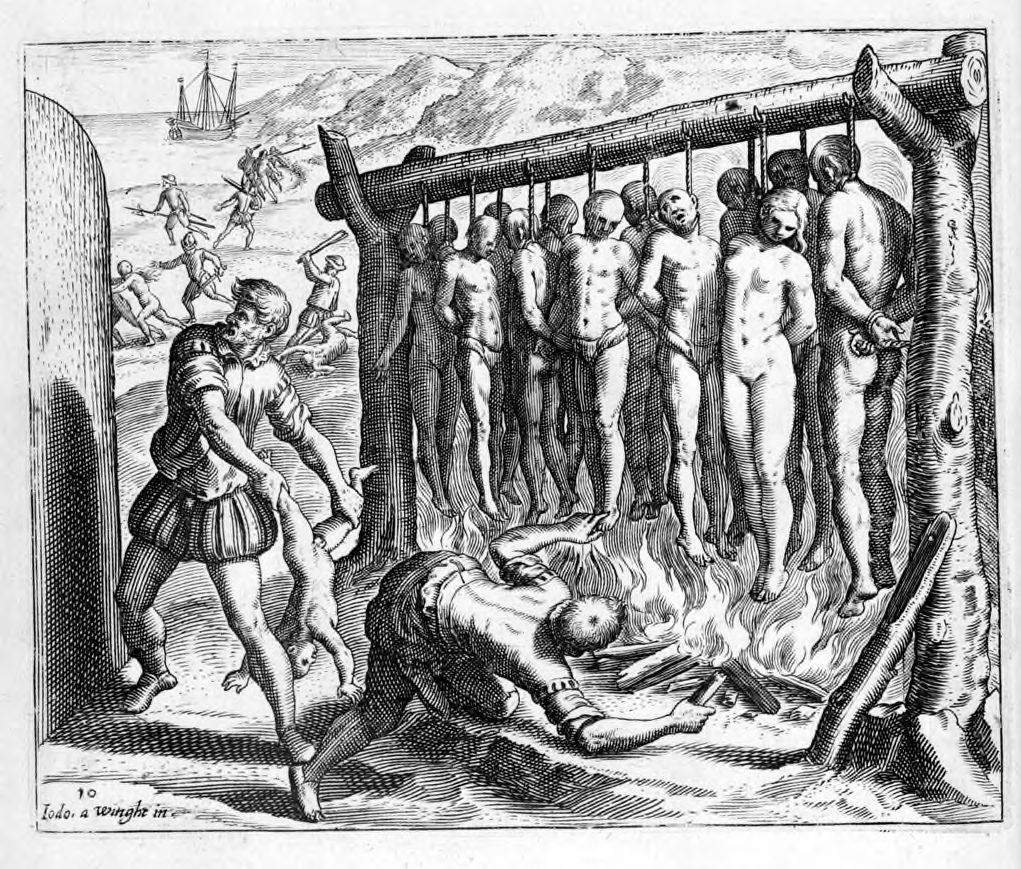
Theodor de Bry illustration depicting Spanish atrocities during the conquest of Hispaniola. Las Casas wrote about the cruelty of Spanish settlers: "They erected certain Gibbets, large, but low made, so that their feet almost reached the ground, every one of which was so ordered as to bear Thirteen Persons in Honour and Reverence (as they said blasphemously) of our Redeemer and his Twelve Apostles, under which they made a Fire to burn them to Ashes whilst hanging on them"

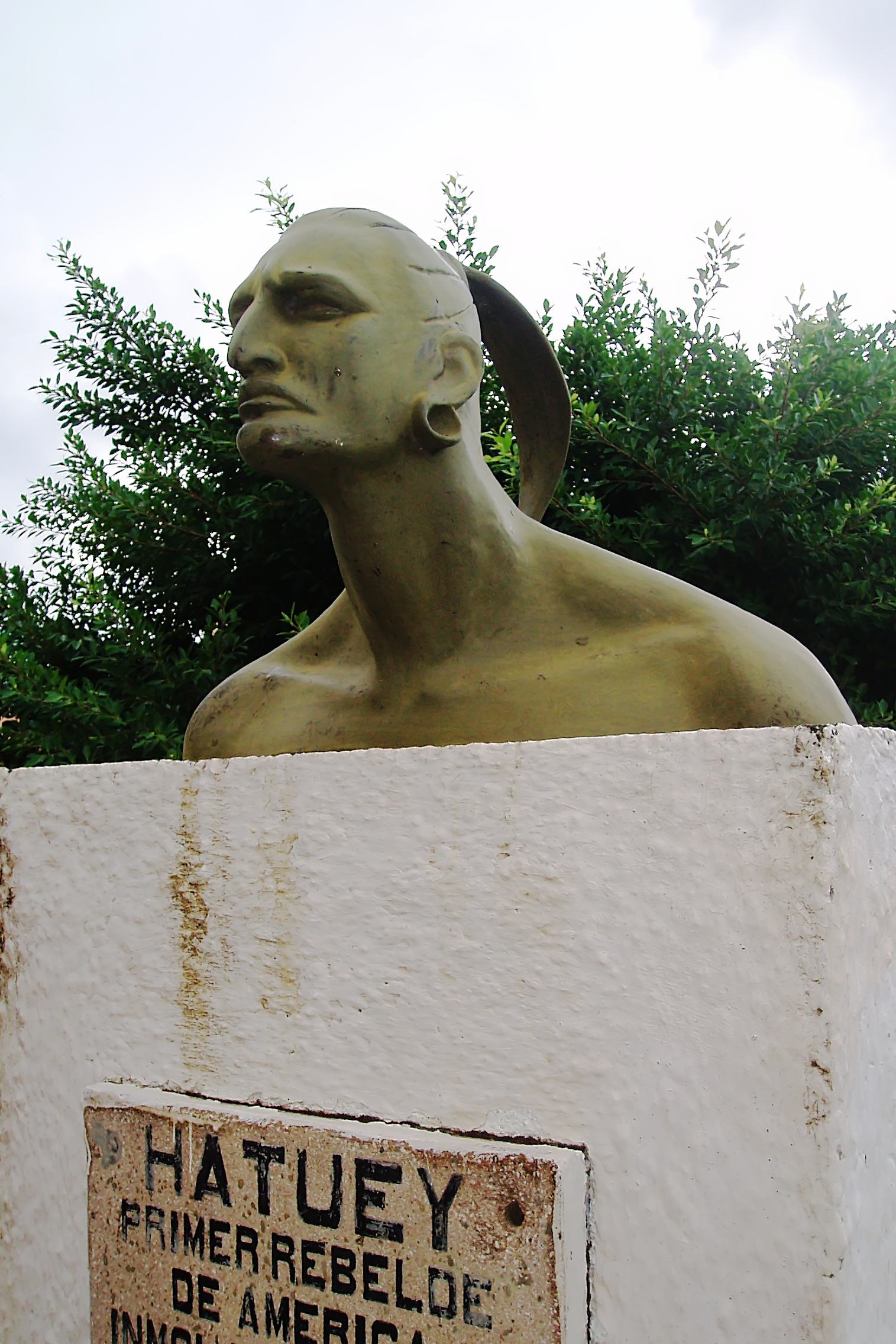
Bust of Hatuey, who rebelled against the Spaniards

Spanish explorations of other islands in the Caribbean and what turned out to be the mainland of South and Central America occupied them for over two decades. Columbus had promised the crown that the region he now controlled held a huge treasure in the form of gold and spices. Spanish settlers initially found relatively dense populations of indigenous peoples, who were agriculturalists living in villages ruled by leaders not part of a larger integrated political system. The Spanish saw these populations as a source of labor, there for their exploitation, to supply their own settlements with foodstuffs, but more importantly for the Spanish, to extract mineral wealth or produce another valuable commodity for Spanish enrichment. The labor of dense populations of Taíno were allocated as grants to Spanish settlers in an institution known as the encomienda, where particular indigenous settlements were awarded to individual Spaniards. There was surface gold found in early islands, and holders of encomiendas put the indigenous to work panning for it. For all practical purposes, this was slavery.

Queen Isabel put an end to formal slavery, declaring the indigenous to be vassals of the crown, but Spaniards' exploitation of indigenous labor continued. The Taíno population on Hispaniola went from hundreds of thousands or millions – the estimates by scholars vary widely – but in the mid-1490s, they were practically wiped out. Disease and overwork, disruption of family life and the agricultural cycle (which caused severe food shortages to Spaniards dependent on them) rapidly decimated the indigenous population. From the Spanish viewpoint, their source of labor and viability of their own settlements was at risk. After the collapse of the Taino population of Hispaniola, Spaniards began raiding indigenous settlements on nearby islands, including Cuba, Puerto Rico, and Jamaica, to enslave those populations, replicating the demographic catastrophe there as well. The names of two indigenous leaders (caciques) who rebelled against Spanish colonization, Enriquillo and Hatuey in the Dominican Republic (Hispaniola), have become important.

Dominican friar Antonio de Montesinos denounced Spanish cruelty and abuse in a sermon in 1511, which comes down to us in the writings of Dominican friar Bartolomé de las Casas. In 1542, Las Casas wrote a damning account of this demographic catastrophe, A Short Account of the Destruction of the Indies. It was translated quickly to English and became the basis for the anti-Spanish writings, collectively known as the Black Legend. Las Casas spent his long life attempting to defend the indigenous populations and to enlist the Spanish crown in establishing protections for them, seen most prominently in the enactment of the New Laws of 1542, restricting Spaniards' inheritance of encomiendas.

The first mainland explorations by Spaniards were followed by a phase of inland expeditions and conquest. In 1500 the city of Nueva Cádiz was founded on the island of Cubagua, Venezuela, followed by the founding of Santa Cruz by Alonso de Ojeda in the present-day Guajira Peninsula. Cumaná in Venezuela was the first permanent settlement founded by Europeans in the mainland Americas, in 1501 by Franciscan friars, but due to successful attacks by the indigenous people, it had to be refounded several times, until Diego Hernández de Serpa's foundation in 1569. The Spanish founded San Sebastián de Uraba in 1509 but abandoned it within the year. There is indirect evidence that the first permanent Spanish mainland settlement established in the Americas was Santa María la Antigua del Darién.

Spaniards spent over 25 years in the Caribbean where their initial high hopes of dazzling wealth gave way to continuing exploitation of disappearing indigenous populations, exhaustion of local gold mines, initiation of cane sugar cultivation as an export product, and forced migration of enslaved Africans as a labor force. Spaniards continued to expand their presence in the circum-Caribbean region with expeditions. One was by Francisco Hernández de Córdoba in 1517, another by Juan de Grijalva in 1518, which brought promising news of possibilities there. Even by the mid-1510s, the western Caribbean was largely unexplored by Spaniards. A well-connected settler in Cuba, Hernán Cortés received authorization in 1519 by the governor of Cuba to form an expedition of exploration-only to this far western region. That expedition was to make world history. The Caribbean islands became less central to Spain's overseas colonization, but remained important strategically and economically, especially the islands of Cuba and Hispaniola. Smaller islands claimed by Spain were lost to the English and the Dutch, with France taking half of Hispaniola and establishing the sugar-producing colony of St-Domingue, as well as also taking other islands.

=== Mexico ===
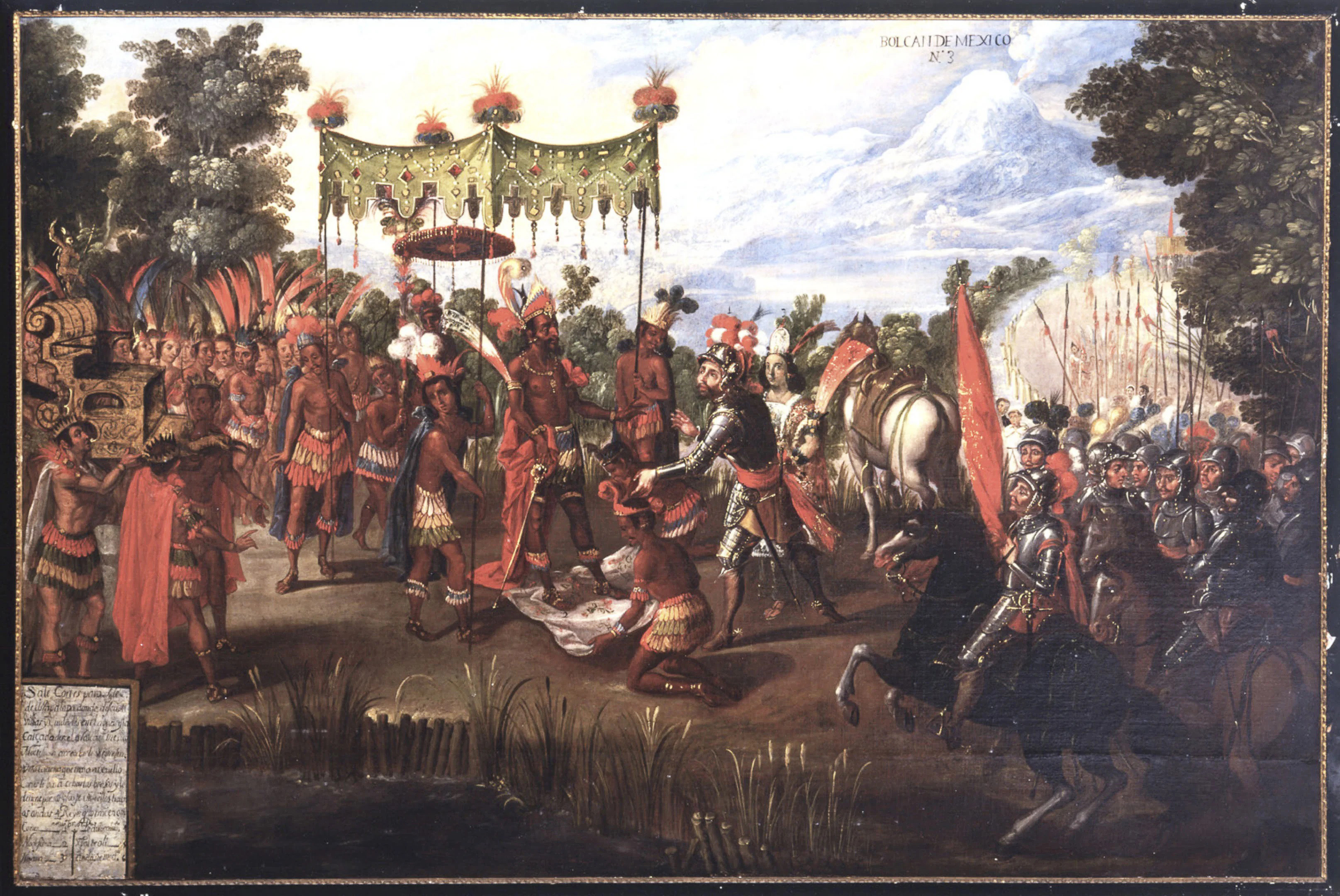
Meeting of Cortés and Moctezuma, 17th c. depiction

With Spanish expansion into central Mexico under conqueror Hernán Cortés and the conquest of the Aztec Empire (1519–1521), Spanish explorers were able to find wealth on the scale that they had long hoped for. Unlike Spanish contact with indigenous populations in the Caribbean, which involved limited armed combat and sometimes the participation of indigenous allies, the conquest of central Mexico was protracted and necessitated significant numbers of indigenous allies, who chose to participate in defeating the Aztec Empire for their own purposes. The conquest of the Aztec Empire involved the combined effort of armies from many indigenous allies, spearheaded by a small Spanish force of conquistadors. The Aztecs did not govern over an empire in the conventional sense but were the rulers of a confederation of dozens of city-states and other polities; the status of each varied from harshly subjugated to closely allied. The Spaniards persuaded the leaders of Aztec vassals and Tlaxcala (a city-state never conquered by the Aztecs), to ally with them against the Aztecs. Through such methods, the Spaniards came to accumulate a massive force of thousands, perhaps tens of thousands of indigenous warriors. Records of the conquest of central Mexico include accounts by the expedition leader Hernán Cortés, Bernal Díaz del Castillo and other Spanish conquistadors, indigenous allies from the city-states altepetl of Tlaxcala, Texcoco, and Huexotzinco. In addition, indigenous accounts were written by the defeated from the Aztec capital, Tenochtitlan, a case of history being written by those other than the victors.

The capture of the Aztec emperor Moctezuma II, by Cortés was not a brilliant stroke of innovation, but came from the playbook that the Spanish developed during their period in the Caribbean. The composition of the expedition was the standard pattern, with a senior leader, and participating men investing in the enterprise with the full expectation of rewards if they did not lose their lives. Cortés's seeking indigenous allies was a typical tactic of warfare: divide and conquer. But the indigenous allies had much to gain by throwing off Aztec rule. For the Spaniards' Tlaxcalan allies, their crucial support gained them enduring political legacy into the modern era, the Mexican state of Tlaxcala.

The conquest of central Mexico sparked further Spanish conquests, following the pattern of conquered and consolidated regions being the launching point for further expeditions. These were often led by secondary leaders, such as Pedro de Alvarado. Later conquests in Mexico were protracted campaigns with less immediate results than the conquest of the Aztec Empire. The Spanish conquest of Yucatán, the Spanish conquest of Guatemala, the conquest of the Purépecha of Michoacan, the war of Mexico's west, and the Chichimeca War in northern Mexico expanded Spanish control over territory and indigenous populations stretching thousands of miles. Not until the conquest of the Incan Empire, which used similar tactics and began in 1532, was the conquest of the Aztecs matched in scale of either territory or treasure.

=== Peru ===
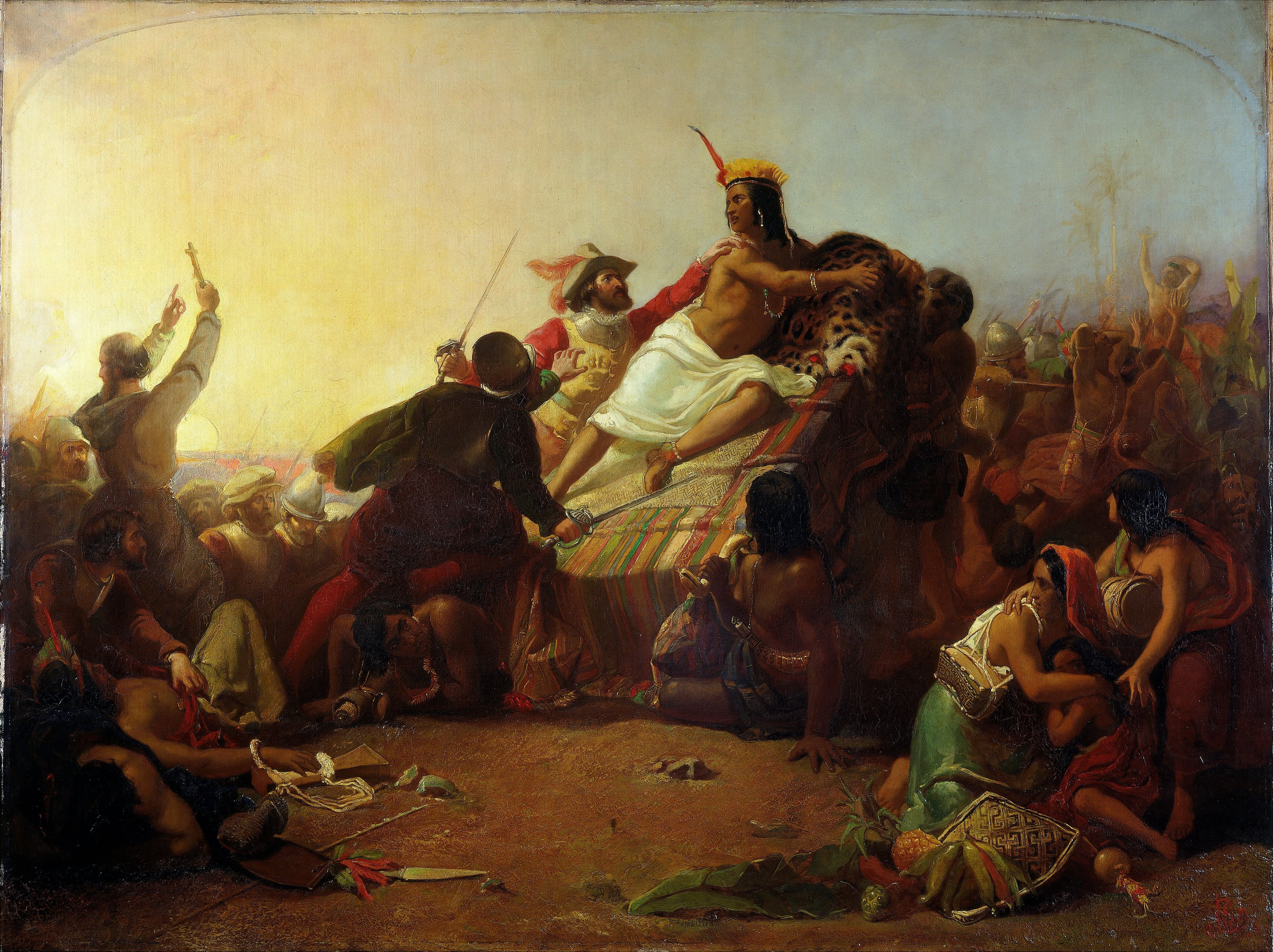
Depiction of Pizarro seizing the Inca emperor Atahualpa. John Everett Millais 1845.

Extent of the Inca Empire at the eve of the Spanish conquest

In 1532 at the Battle of Cajamarca, a group of Spaniards under Francisco Pizarro and their indigenous Andean Indian auxiliaries native allies ambushed and captured the Emperor Atahualpa of the Inca Empire. It was the first step in a long campaign that took decades of fighting to subdue the mightiest empire in the Americas. In the following years, Spain extended its rule over the Empire of the Inca civilization.

The Spaniards took advantage of a recent civil war between the factions of the two brothers Emperor Atahualpa and Huáscar, and the enmity of indigenous nations the Incas had subjugated, such as the Huanca, Chachapoyas, and Cañaris. In the following years the conquistadors and indigenous allies extended control over the Greater Andes Region. The Viceroyalty of Perú was established in 1542. The last Inca stronghold was conquered by the Spaniards in 1572.

Peru was the last territory on the continent under Spanish rule, which ended on 9 December 1824 at the Battle of Ayacucho (Spanish rule continued until 1898 in Cuba and Puerto Rico).

=== Chile ===
[Chile] has four months of winter, no more, and in them, except when there is a quarter moon, when it rains one or two days, all the other days have such a beautiful sunshine...

— First relation letter from Pedro de Valdivia to emperor Charles V

Chile was explored by Spaniards based in Peru, where Spaniards found the fertile soil and mild climate attractive. The Mapuche people of Chile, whom the Spaniards called Araucanians, resisted fiercely. The Spanish did establish the settlement of Chile in 1541, founded by Pedro de Valdivia.

Southward colonization by the Spanish in Chile halted after the conquest of Chiloé Archipelago in 1567. This is thought to have been the result of an increasingly harsh climate to the south, and the lack of a populous and sedentary indigenous population to settle among for the Spaniards in the fjords and channels of Patagonia. South of the Bío-Bío River the Mapuche successfully reversed colonization with the Destruction of the Seven Cities in 1599–1604. This Mapuche victory laid the foundation for the establishment of a Spanish-Mapuche frontier called La Frontera. Within this frontier the city of Concepción assumed the role of "military capital" of Spanish-ruled Chile. With a hostile indigenous population, no obvious mineral or other exploitable resources, and little strategic value, Chile was a fringe area of colonial Spanish America, hemmed in geographically by the Andes to the east, Pacific Ocean to the west, and indigenous to the south.

=== New Granada ===
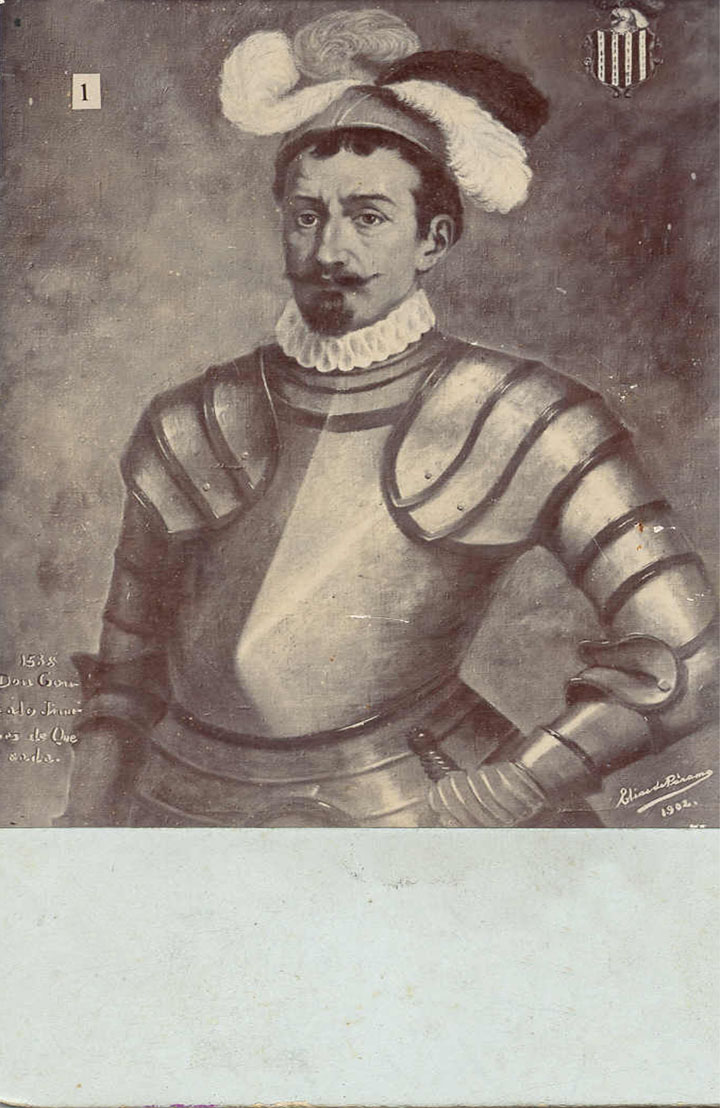
Gonzalo Jiménez de Quesada

Between 1537 and 1543, six Spanish expeditions entered highland Colombia, conquered the Muisca Confederation, and set up the New Kingdom of Granada (Spanish: Nuevo Reino de Granada). Gonzalo Jiménez de Quesada was the leading conquistador with his brother Hernán second in command. It was governed by the president of the Audiencia of Bogotá, and comprised an area corresponding mainly to modern-day Colombia and parts of Venezuela. The conquistadors originally organized it as a captaincy general within the Viceroyalty of Peru. The crown established the audiencia in 1549. Ultimately, the kingdom became part of the Viceroyalty of New Granada first in 1717 and permanently in 1739. After several attempts to set up independent states in the 1810s, the kingdom and the viceroyalty ceased to exist altogether in 1819 with the establishment of Gran Colombia.

=== Venezuela ===
Venezuela was first visited by Europeans during the 1490s, when Columbus was in control of the region, and the region as a source for Indigenous slaves for Spaniards in Cuba and Hispaniola, since the Spanish destruction of the local Indigenous population. There were few permanent settlements, but Spaniards settled the coastal islands of Cubagua and Margarita to exploit the pearl beds. Western Venezuela's history took an atypical direction in 1528, when Spain's first Hapsburg monarch, Charles I granted rights to colonize to the German banking family of the Welsers. Charles sought to be elected Holy Roman Emperor and was willing to pay whatever it took to achieve that. He became deeply indebted to the German Welser and Fugger banking families. To satisfy his debts to the Welsers, he granted them the right to colonize and exploit western Venezuela, with the proviso that they found two towns with 300 settlers each and construct fortifications. They established the colony of Klein-Venedig in 1528. They founded the towns of Coro and Maracaibo. They were aggressive in making their investment pay, alienating the indigenous populations and Spaniards alike. Charles revoked the grant in 1545, ending the episode of German colonization.

=== Río de la Plata and Paraguay ===
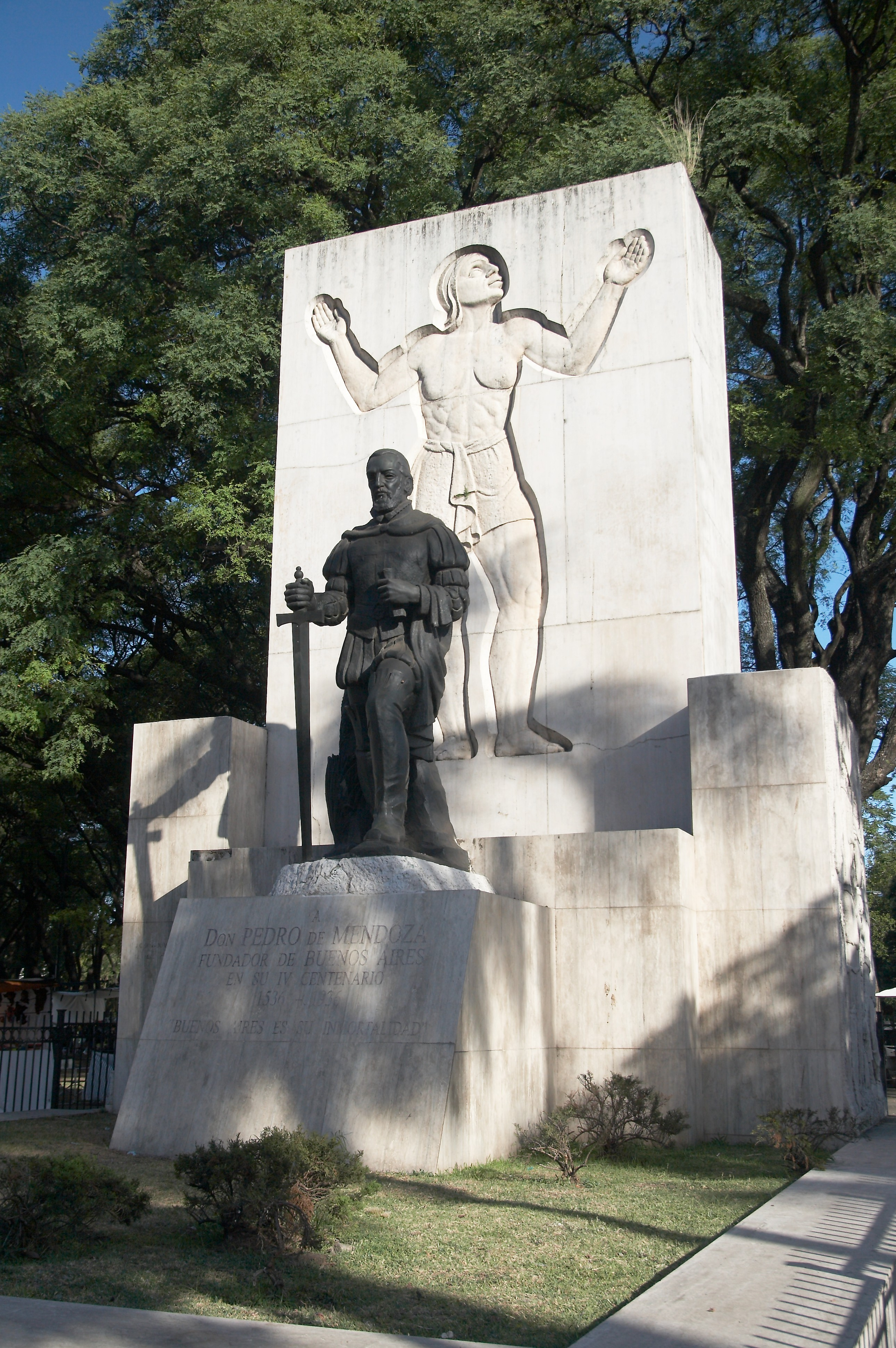
Monument to Pedro de Mendoza, Buenos Aires

Argentina was not conquered or later exploited in the grand fashion of central Mexico or Peru, since the indigenous population was sparse and there were no precious metals or other valuable resources. Although today Buenos Aires at the mouth of Río de la Plata is a major metropolis, it held no interest for Spaniards and the 1535–1536 settlement failed and was abandoned by 1541. Pedro de Mendoza and Domingo Martínez de Irala, who led the original expedition, went inland and founded Asunción, Paraguay, which became the Spaniards' base. A second (and permanent) settlement was established in 1580 by Juan de Garay, who arrived by sailing down the Paraná River from Asunción, now the capital of Paraguay. Exploration from Peru resulted in the foundation of Tucumán in what is now northwest Argentina.

=== United States ===
Much of what is now the Southern United States was claimed by Spain, some of it at least explored by the Spanish starting in the early 1500s, and some permanent settlements established. Spanish explorers claimed land for the crown in the modern-day states of Alabama, Arizona, the Carolinas, Colorado, Florida, Georgia, Mississippi, New Mexico, Texas, and California. Puerto Rico was also colonized by the Spanish during this era, occasioning the earliest contact between Africans and what would become the United States (via the free Black conquistador Juan Garrido). Free and enslaved Africans were a feature of New Spain throughout the colonial period.

One of the colonists who conquered Puerto Rico, Juan Ponce de León, is commonly given credit for being the first European to sight Florida in 1513. (Note: The Portuguese Cantino map dates back to 1502 and seems to depict Florida and the surrounding land.) For political reasons, Spain would sometimes claim that La Florida (Note: Florida was supposedly named because it was spotted on Easter, or the Festival of Flowers as it was commonly called in Spain.) was all of the North American continent. However, the name was typically used to refer to the peninsula itself as well as the Gulf Coast, Georgia, Carolina, and southern Virginia. In 1521, Ponce de Leon was killed while trying to establish a settlement near what is now Charlotte Harbor, Florida. Another failed attempt was conducted by Lucas Vázquez de Ayllón, who set out with approximately 500 colonists and established the settlement of San Miguel de Gualdape in modern-day South Carolina in 1526. In the fall of 1528, Spanish explorer Álvar Núñez Cabeza de Vaca landed on present day Follet's Island, Texas.

In 1559, Tristán de Luna y Arellano established the first multi-year European settlement in the United States in what is now Pensacola, Florida. This settlement predates the foundation of Mission Nombre de Dios in St. Augustine by six years, marking an important yet often overlooked moment in the history of Spanish colonization. Archaeological evidence from the University of West Florida has confirmed the presence of Luna's expedition, which included 1,500 people and lasted from 1559 to 1561. The artifacts discovered at the site provide a direct link to Spain's early efforts to colonize the northern Gulf Coast.

The 1565 establishment of the settlement in St. Augustine, Florida, lasted in one way or another until modern times, making the city arguably the oldest in the United States. Permanent Spanish settlements were founded in New Mexico, starting in 1598, with Santa Fe founded in 1610.

=== End of era of exploration ===
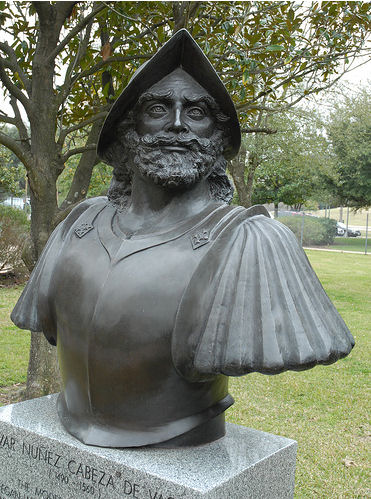
Bust of Álvar Núñez Cabeza de Vaca, who wrote epic account of years of wandering in the North American south and southwest

The spectacular conquests of central Mexico (1519–1521) and Peru (1532) sparked Spaniards' hopes of finding yet another high civilization. Expeditions continued into the 1540s and regional capitals founded by the 1550s. Among the most notable expeditions are Hernando de Soto into southeast North America, leaving from Cuba (1539–1542); Francisco Vázquez de Coronado to northern Mexico (1540–1542), and Gonzalo Pizarro to Amazonia, leaving from Quito, Ecuador (1541–1542). In 1561, Pedro de Ursúa led an expedition of some 370 Spanish (including women and children) into Amazonia to search for El Dorado. Far more famous now is Lope de Aguirre, who led a mutiny against Ursúa, who was murdered. Aguirre subsequently wrote a letter to Philip II bitterly complaining about the treatment of conquerors like himself in the wake of the assertion of crown control over Peru. An earlier expedition that left in 1527 was led by Pánfilo Narváez, who was killed early on. Survivors continued to travel among indigenous groups in the North American south and southwest until 1536. Álvar Núñez Cabeza de Vaca was one of four survivors of that expedition, writing an account of it. The crown later sent him to Asunción, Paraguay to be adelantado there. Expeditions continued to explore territories in hopes of finding another Aztec or Inca empire, with no further success. Francisco de Ibarra led an expedition from Zacatecas in northern New Spain, and founded Durango. Juan de Oñate, is sometimes referred to as "the Last Conquistador", expanded Spanish sovereignty over what is now New Mexico. Like previous conquistadors, Oñate engaged in widespread abuses of the Indian population. (Note: most notoriously, the Acoma Massacre) Shortly after founding Santa Fe, Oñate was recalled to Mexico City by the Spanish authorities. He was subsequently tried and convicted of cruelty to both natives and colonists and banished from New Mexico for life.

=== Factors affecting Spanish settlement ===
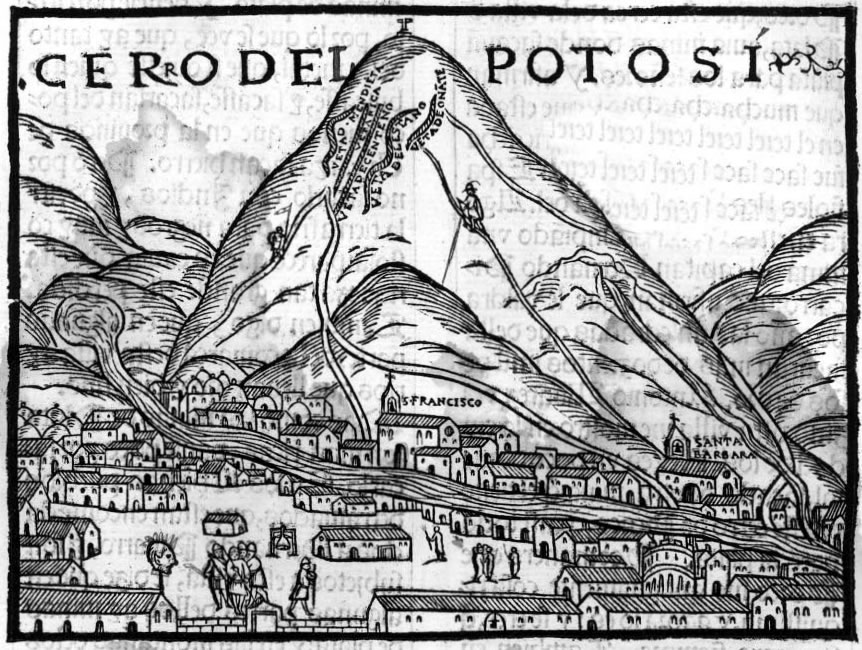
Cerro Rico del Potosi, the first image of silver mountain in Europe. Pedro Cieza de León, 1553.

Two major factors affected the density of Spanish settlement in the long term. One was the presence or absence of dense, hierarchically organized indigenous populations that could be made to work. The other was the presence or absence of an exploitable resource for the enrichment of settlers. Best was gold, but silver was found in abundance.

The two main areas of Spanish settlement after 1550 were Mexico and Peru, the sites of the Aztec and Inca indigenous civilizations, and rich deposits of the valuable metal silver. Spanish settlement in Mexico "largely replicated the organization of the area in preconquest times". However, in Peru the center of the Incas was too far south, too remote, and at too high an altitude for the Spanish capital, so the capital Lima was built near the Pacific coast. The capitals of both Mexico and Peru (Mexico City and Lima) came to have large concentrations of Spanish settlers and hubs of royal and ecclesiastical administration, large commercial enterprises with skilled artisans, and centers of culture. Although Spaniards had hoped to find vast quantities of gold, the discovery of large quantities of silver became the motor of the Spanish colonial economy, a major source of income for the Spanish crown, and transformed the international economy. Mining regions in Mexico were remote, outside the zone of indigenous settlement in central and southern Mexico Mesoamerica, but mines in Zacatecas (founded 1548) and Guanajuato (founded 1548) emerged as key hubs in the colonial economy. In Peru, silver was found in a single silver mountain, the Cerro Rico de Potosí, which is still producing silver in the 21st century. Potosí (founded 1545) was in the zone of dense indigenous settlement, so that labor could be mobilized on traditional patterns to extract the ore. An important element for productive mining was mercury for processing high-grade ore. Peru had a source in Huancavelica (founded 1572), while Mexico had to rely on mercury imported from Spain.

=== Establishment of early settlements ===
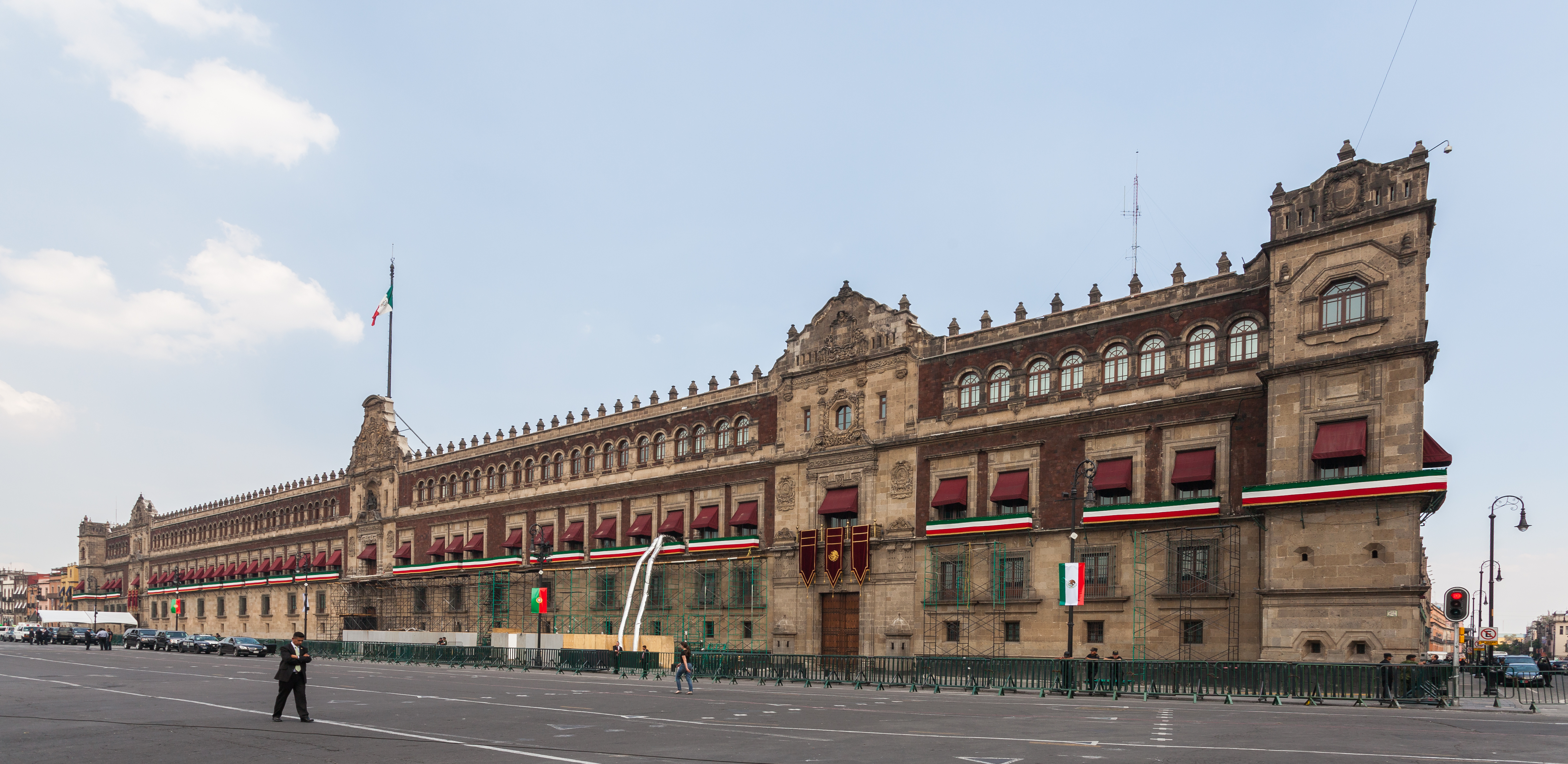
National Palace, Mexico City, built by Hernán Cortés in the Aztec central zone of palaces and temples

The Spaniards founded towns in the Caribbean, on Hispaniola and Cuba, on a pattern that became spatially similar throughout Spanish America. A central plaza had the most important buildings on the four sides, especially buildings for royal officials and the main church. A checkerboard pattern radiated outward. Residences of the officials and elites were closest to the main square. Once on the mainland, where there were dense indigenous populations in urban settlements, the Spaniards could build a settlement on the same site, dating its foundation to when that occurred. Often they erected a church on the site of an Indigenous temple. They replicated the existing Indigenous network of settlements, but added a port city. The Spanish network needed a port city so that inland settlements could be connected by sea to Spain. In Mexico, Hernán Cortés and the men of his expedition founded of the port town of Veracruz in 1519 and constituted themselves as the town councilors, as a means to throw off the authority of the governor of Cuba, who did not authorize an expedition of conquest. Once the Aztec Empire was toppled, they founded Mexico City on the ruins of the Aztec capital. Their central official and ceremonial area was built on top of Aztec palaces and temples. In Peru, Spaniards founded the city of Lima as their capital and its nearby port of Callao, rather than the high-altitude site of Cuzco, the center of Inca rule. Spaniards established a network of settlements in areas they conquered and controlled. Important ones include Santiago de Guatemala (1524); Puebla (1531); Querétaro (ca. 1531); Guadalajara (1531–42); Valladolid (now Morelia) (1529–41)); Antequera (now Oaxaca (1525–29)); Campeche (1541); and Mérida. In southern Central and South America, settlements were founded in Panama (1519); León, Nicaragua (1524); Cartagena (1532); Piura (1532); Quito (1534); Trujillo (1535); Cali (1537) Bogotá (1538); Quito (1534); Cuzco (1534); Lima (1535); Tunja, (1539); Huamanga (1539); Arequipa (1540); Santiago de Chile (1544) and Concepción, Chile (1550). Settled from the south were Buenos Aires (1536, 1580); Asunción (1537); Potosí (1545); La Paz, Bolivia (1548); and Tucumán (1553).

=== Ecological conquests and demographic catastrophe ===
The Columbian exchange was as significant as the clash of civilizations. Arguably the most significant introduction was diseases brought to the Americas, which devastated indigenous populations in a series of epidemics. The loss of indigenous population had a direct impact on Spaniards as well, since increasingly they saw those populations as a source of their own wealth, disappearing before their eyes.

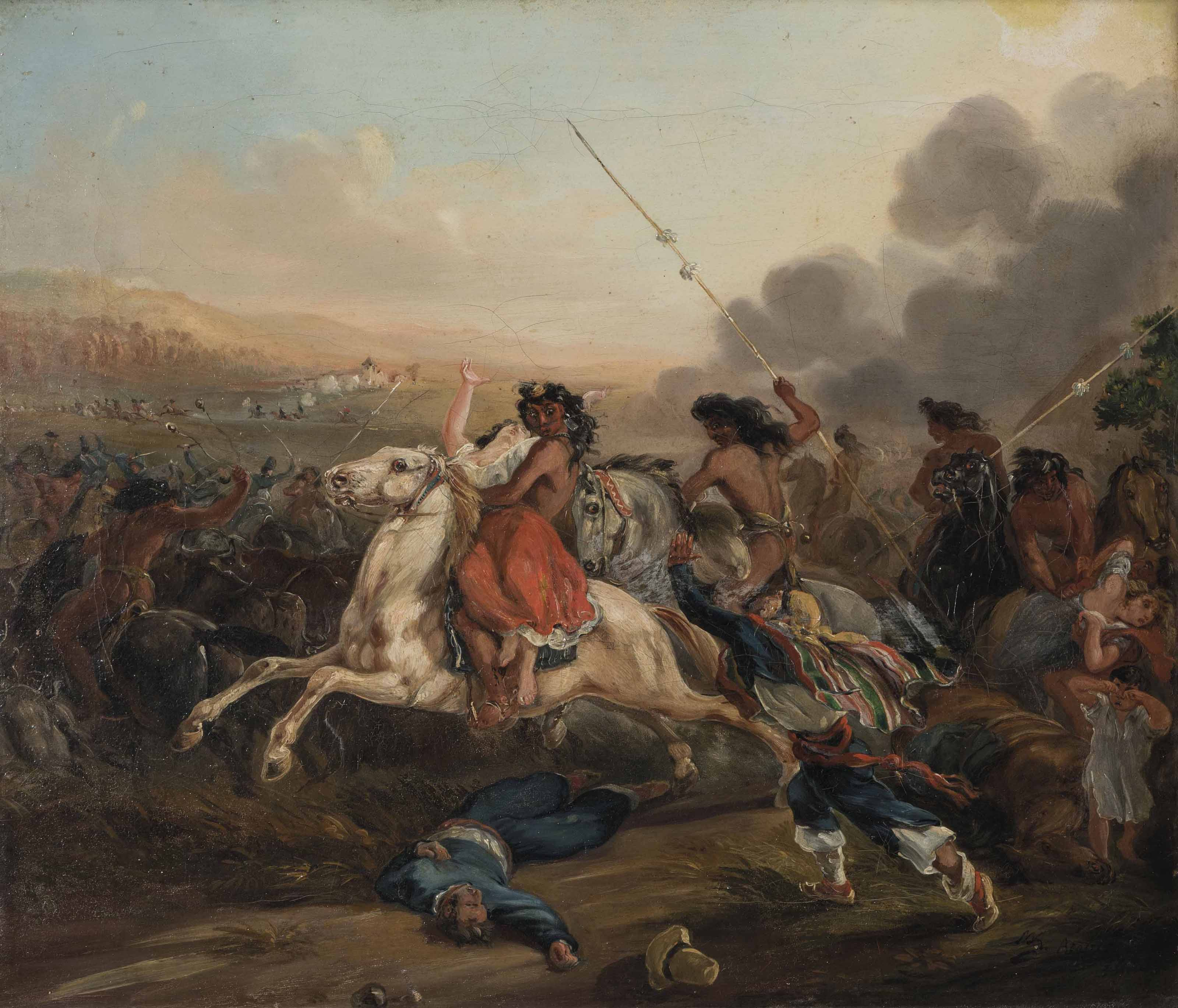
A mounted Mapuche carrying off a Spanish woman. Johann Moritz Rugendas.

In the first settlements in the Caribbean, the Spaniards deliberately brought animals and plants that transformed the ecological landscape. Pigs, cattle, sheep, goats, and chickens allowed Spaniards to eat a diet with which they were familiar. But the importation of horses transformed warfare for both the Spaniards and the indigenous. Where the Spaniards had exclusive access to horses in warfare, they had an advantage over indigenous warriors on foot. They were initially a scarce commodity, but horse breeding became an active industry. Horses that escaped Spanish control were captured by indigenous; many indigenous also raided for horses. Mounted indigenous warriors were significant foes for Spaniards. The Chichimeca in northern Mexico, the Comanche in the northern Great Plains and the Mapuche in southern Chile and the pampas of Argentina resisted Spanish conquest. For Spaniards, the fierce Chichimecas barred them for exploiting mining resources in northern Mexico. Spaniards waged a 50-year war (ca. 1550–1600) to subdue them, but peace was only achieved by Spaniards' making significant donations of food and other commodities the Chichimeca demanded. "Peace by purchase" ended the conflict. In southern Chile and the pampas, the Araucanians (Mapuche) prevented further Spanish expansion. The image of mounted Araucanians capturing and carrying off white women was the embodiment of Spanish ideas of civilization and barbarism.

Cattle multiplied quickly in areas where little else could turn a profit for Spaniards, including northern Mexico and the Argentine pampas. The introduction of sheep production was an ecological disaster in places where they were raised in great numbers, since they ate vegetation to the ground, preventing the regeneration of plants.

The Spaniards brought new crops for cultivation. (See Mission Garden for specific foods.) They preferred wheat cultivation to indigenous sources of carbohydrates: casava, maize (corn), and potatoes, initially importing seeds from Europe and planting in areas where plow agriculture could be utilized, such as the Mexican Bajío. They also imported cane sugar, which was a high-value crop in early Spanish America. Spaniards also imported citrus trees, establishing orchards of oranges, lemons, limes, and grapefruit. Other imports were figs, apricots, cherries, pears, and peaches among others. The exchange did not go one way. Important indigenous crops that transformed Europe were the potato and maize, which produced abundant crops that led to the expansion of populations in Europe. Chocolate and vanilla were cultivated in Mexico and exported to Europe. Among the foodstuffs that became staples in European cuisine and could be grown there were tomatoes, squashes, bell peppers, cashews, pecans, and peanuts.

== Civil governance ==
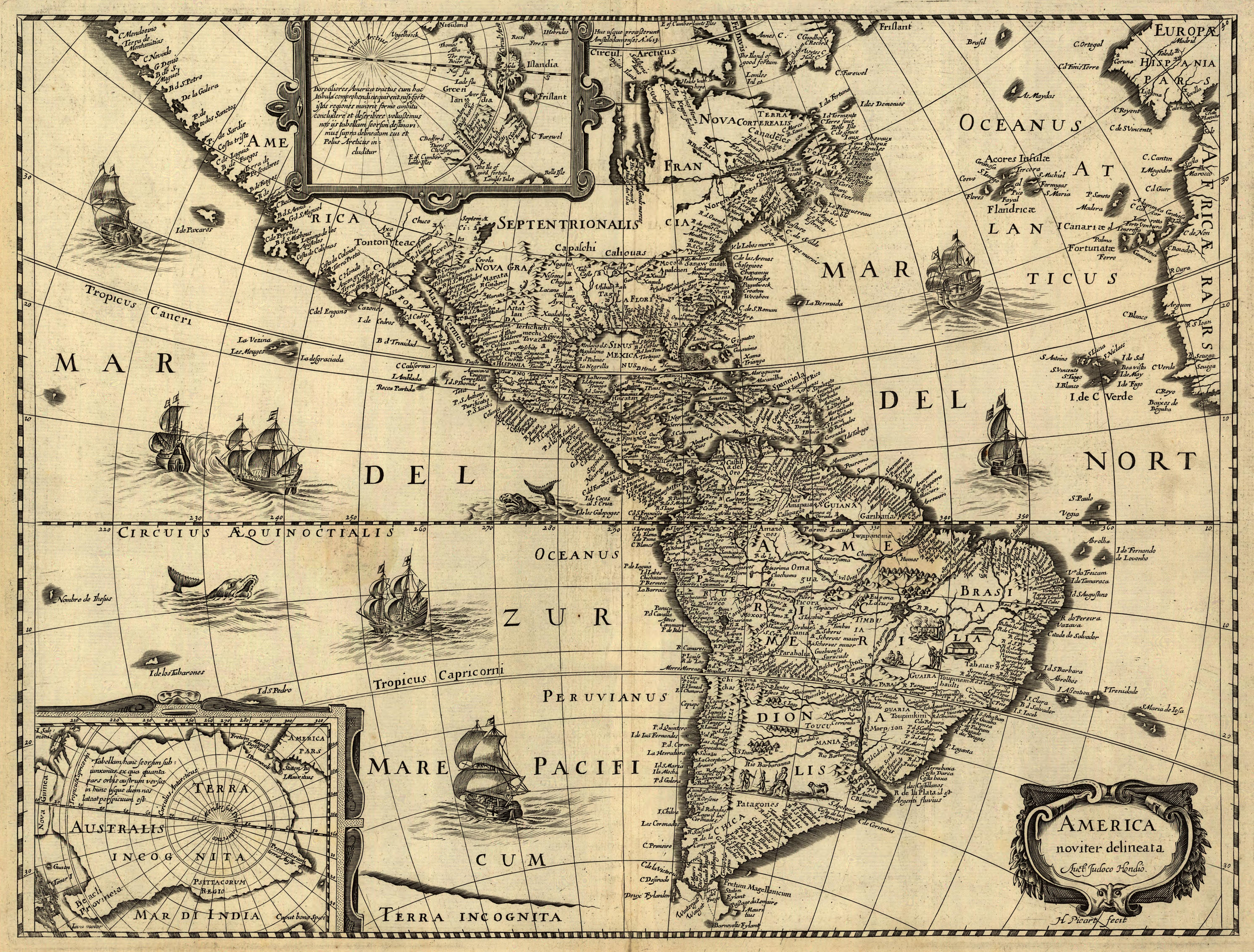
17th-century Dutch map of the Americas

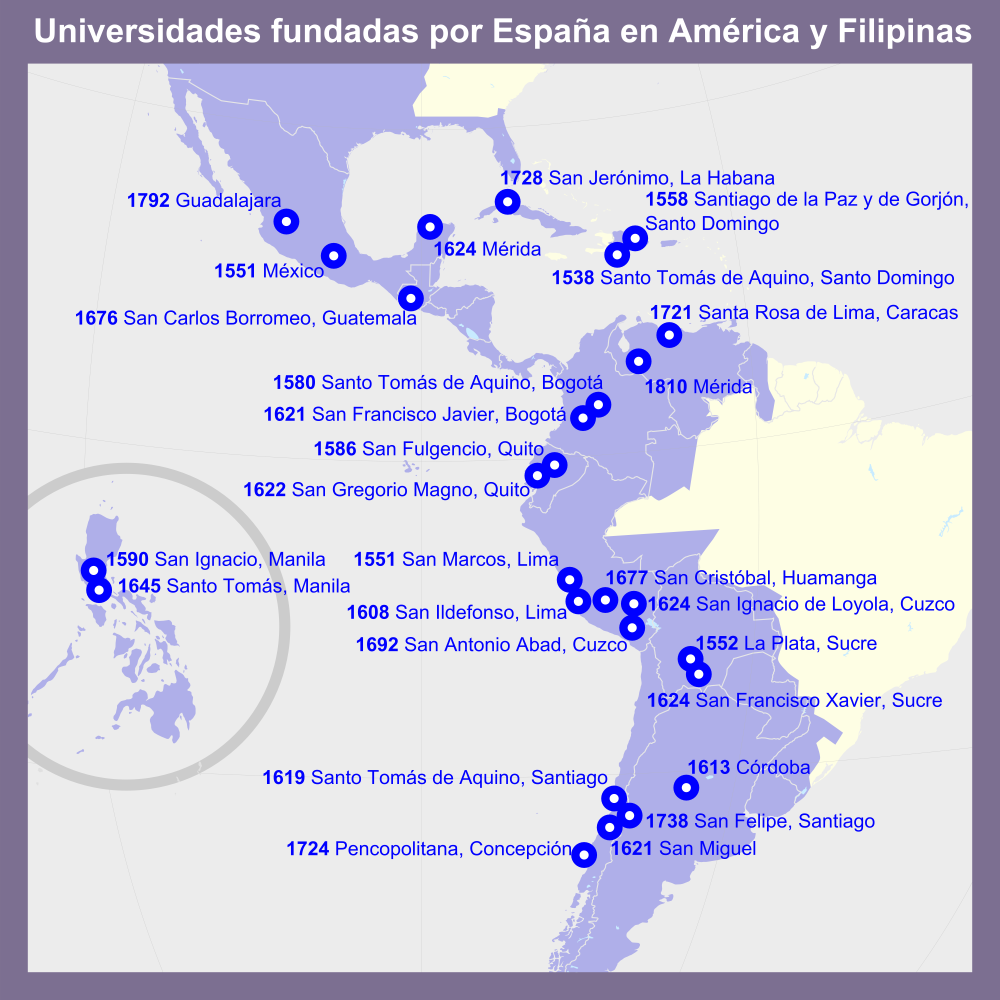
Universities founded in Spanish America by the Spanish Empire

The empire in the Indies was a newly established dependency of the kingdom of Castile alone, so crown power was not impeded by any existing cortes (i.e. parliament), administrative or ecclesiastical institution, or seigneurial group. The crown sought to establish and maintain control over its overseas possessions through a complex, hierarchical bureaucracy, which in many ways was decentralized. The crown asserted is authority and sovereignty of the territory and vassals it claimed, collected taxes, maintained public order, meted out justice, and established policies for governance of large indigenous populations. Many institutions established in Castile found expression in The Indies from the early colonial period. Spanish universities expanded to train lawyer-bureaucrats (letrados) for administrative positions in Spain and its overseas empire.

The end of the Habsburg dynasty in 1700 saw major administrative reforms in the eighteenth century under the Bourbon monarchy, starting with the first Spanish Bourbon monarch, Philip V (r. 1700–1746) and reaching its apogee under Charles III (r. 1759–1788). The reorganization of administration has been called "a revolution in government." Reforms sought to centralize government control through reorganization of administration, reinvigorate the economies of Spain and the Spanish Empire through changes in mercantile and fiscal policies, defend Spanish colonies and territorial claims through the establishment of a standing military, undermine the power of the Catholic church, and rein in the power of the American-born elites.

=== Early institutions of governance ===
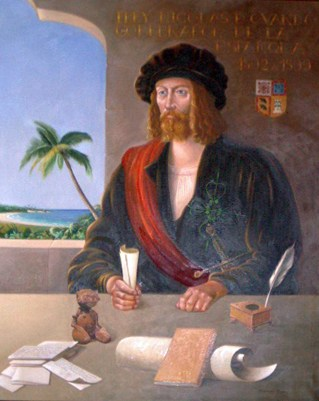
Nicolás de Ovando, sent by the crown to assert royal control

The crown relied on ecclesiastics as important councilors and royal officials in the governance of their overseas territories. Archbishop Juan Rodríguez de Fonseca, Isabella's confessor, was tasked with reining in Columbus's independence. He strongly influenced the formulation of colonial policy under the Catholic Monarchs, and was instrumental in establishing the Casa de Contratación (House of Trade) (1503), which enabled crown control over trade and immigration. Ovando fitted out Magellan's voyage of circumnavigation, and became the first President of the Council of the Indies in 1524. Ecclesiastics also functioned as administrators overseas in the early Caribbean period, particularly Frey Nicolás de Ovando, who was sent to investigate the administration of Francisco de Bobadilla, the governor appointed to succeed Christopher Columbus. Later ecclesiastics served as interim viceroys, general inspectors (visitadores), and other high posts.

==== House of Trade ====
The crown established control over trade and emigration to the Indies with the 1503 establishment the Casa de Contratación (House of Trade) in Seville. Ships and cargoes were registered, and emigrants vetted to prevent migration of anyone not of Old Christian heritage, (i.e., with no Jewish or Muslim ancestry), and facilitated the migration of families and women. In addition, the Casa de Contratación took charge of the fiscal organization, and of the organization and judicial control of the trade with the Indies.

==== Assertion of royal control in the early Caribbean ====
The politics of asserting royal authority to oppose Columbus resulted in the suppression of his privileges and the creation of territorial governance under royal authority. These governorates, also called as provinces, were the basic of the territorial government of the Indies, and arose as the territories were conquered and colonized. To carry out the expedition (entrada), which entailed exploration, conquest, and initial settlement of the territory, the king, as sovereign, and the appointed leader of an expedition (adelantado) agreed to an itemized contract (capitulación), with the specifics of the conditions of the expedition in a particular territory. The individual leaders of expeditions assumed the expenses of the venture and in return received as reward the grant from the government of the conquered territories; and in addition, they received instructions about treating the indigenous peoples.

After the end of the period of conquests, it was necessary to manage extensive and different territories with a strong bureaucracy. In the face of the impossibility of the Castilian institutions to take care of the New World affairs, other new institutions were created.

As the basic political entity it was the governorate, or province. The governors exercised judicial ordinary functions of first instance, and prerogatives of government legislating by ordinances. To these political functions of the governor, it could be joined the military ones, according to military requirements, with the rank of Captain general. The office of captain general involved to be the supreme military chief of the whole territory and he was responsible for recruiting and providing troops, the fortification of the territory, the supply and the shipbuilding.

Beginning in 1522 in the newly conquered Mexico, government units in the Spanish empire had a royal treasury controlled by a set of oficiales reales (royal officials). There were also sub-treasuries at important ports and mining districts. The officials of the royal treasury at each level of government typically included two to four positions: a tesorero (treasurer), the senior official who guarded money on hand and made payments; a contador (accountant or comptroller), who recorded income and payments, maintained records, and interpreted royal instructions; a factor, who guarded weapons and supplies belonging to the king, and disposed of tribute collected in the province; and a veedor (overseer), who was responsible for contacts with native inhabitants of the province, and collected the king's share of any war booty. The veedor, or overseer, position quickly disappeared in most jurisdictions, subsumed into the position of factor. Depending on the conditions in a jurisdiction, the position of factor/veedor was often eliminated, as well.

The treasury officials were appointed by the king, and were largely independent of the authority of the viceroy, audiencia president or governor. On the death, unauthorized absence, retirement or removal of a governor, the treasury officials would jointly govern the province until a new governor appointed by the king could take up his duties. Treasury officials were supposed to be paid out of the income from the province, and were normally prohibited from engaging in income-producing activities.

=== Spanish law and indigenous peoples ===
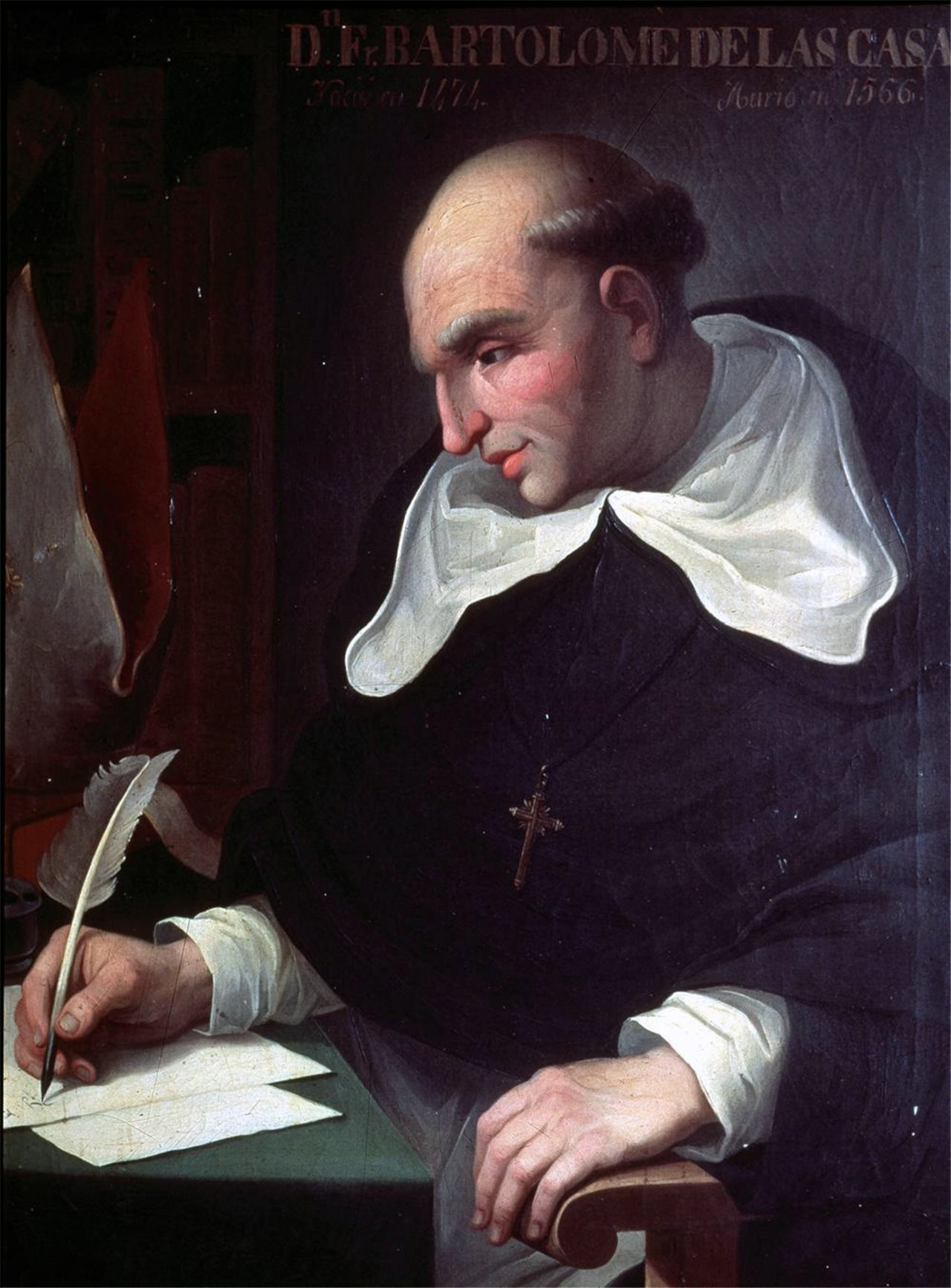
Fray Bartolomé de Las Casas, Protector of the Indians

The protection of the indigenous populations from enslavement and exploitation by Spanish settlers were established in the Laws of Burgos, 1512–1513. The laws were the first codified set of laws governing the behavior of Spanish settlers in the Americas, particularly with regards to treatment of native Indians in the institution of the encomienda. They forbade the maltreatment of natives, and endorsed the forced resettlement of indigenous populations with attempts of conversion to Catholicism. Upon their failure to effectively protect the indigenous and following the Spanish conquest of the Aztec Empire and the Spanish conquest of Peru, more stringent laws to control conquerors' and settlers' exercise of power, especially their maltreatment of the indigenous populations, were promulgated, known as the New Laws (1542). The crown aimed to prevent the formation of an aristocracy in the Indies not under crown control.

Queen Isabel was the first monarch that laid the first stone for the protection of the indigenous peoples in her testament in which the Catholic monarch prohibited the enslavement of the indigenous peoples of the Americas. Then the first such in 1542; the legal thought behind them was the basis of modern International law.

The Valladolid debate (1550–1551) was the first moral debate in European history to discuss the rights and treatment of a colonized people by colonizers. Held in the Colegio de San Gregorio, in the Spanish city of Valladolid, it was a moral and theological debate about the colonization of the Americas, its justification for the conversion to Catholicism and more specifically about the relations between the European settlers and the natives of the New World. It consisted of a number of opposing views about the way natives were to be integrated into colonial life, their conversion to Christianity and their rights and obligations. According to the French historian Jean Dumont, the Valladolid debate was a major turning point in world history, "In that moment in Spain appeared the dawn of the human rights".

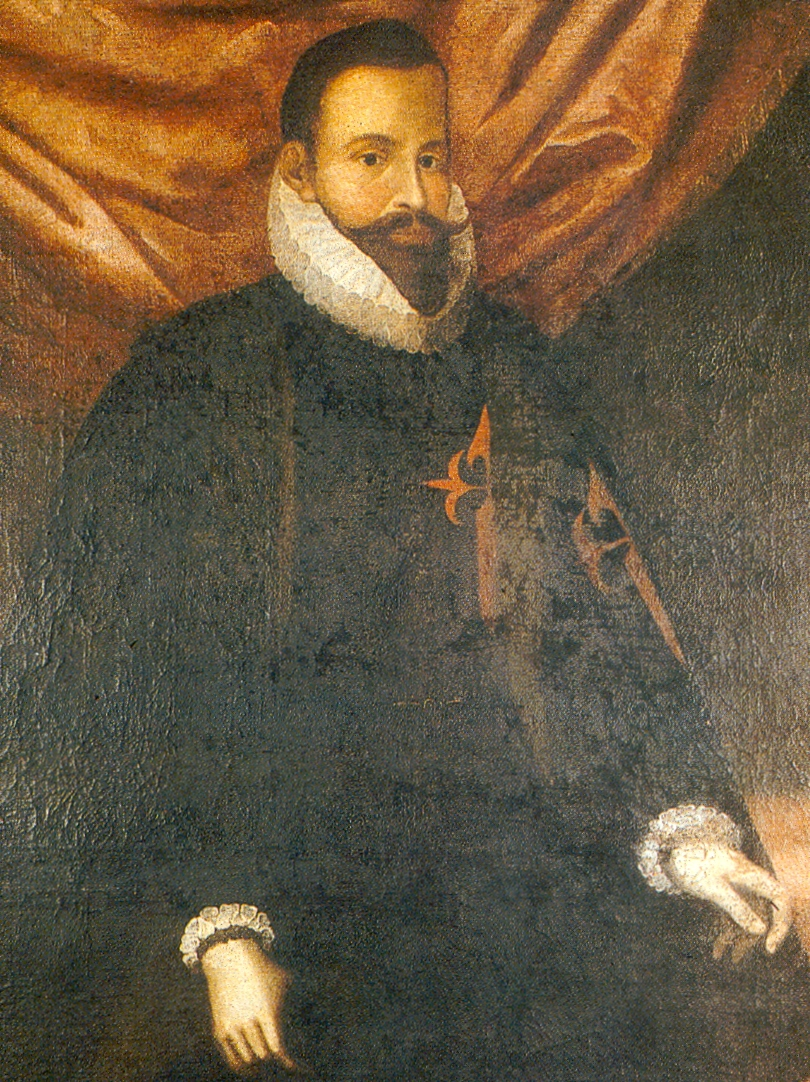
First viceroy of Peru, Blasco Núñez Vela, overthrown by Spaniards for implementing the New Laws

The indigenous populations in the Caribbean became the focus of the crown in its roles as sovereigns of the empire and patron of the Catholic Church. Spanish conquerors holding grants of indigenous labor in encomienda ruthlessly exploited them. A number of friars in the early period came to the vigorous defense of the indigenous populations, who were new converts to Christianity. Prominent Dominican friars in Santo Domingo, especially Antonio de Montesinos and Bartolomé de las Casas denounced the maltreatment and pressed the crown to act to protect the indigenous populations. The crown enacted Laws of Burgos (1513) and the Requerimiento to curb the power of the Spanish conquerors and give indigenous populations the opportunity to peacefully embrace Spanish authority and Christianity. Neither was effective in its purpose. Las Casas was officially appointed Protector of the Indians and spent his life arguing forcefully on their behalf. The New Laws of 1542 were the result, limiting the power of encomenderos, the private holders of grants to indigenous labor previously held in perpetuity. The crown was open to limiting the inheritance of encomiendas in perpetuity as a way to extinguish the coalescence of a group of Spaniards impinging on royal power. In Peru, the attempt of the newly appointed viceroy, Blasco Núñez Vela, to implement the New Laws so soon after the conquest sparked a revolt by conquerors against the viceroy and the viceroy was killed in 1546. In Mexico, Don Martín Cortés, the son and legal heir of conqueror Hernán Cortés, and other heirs of encomiendas led a failed revolt against the crown. Don Martín was sent into exile, while other conspirators were executed.

=== Indigenous peoples and colonial rule ===
Detail of a gallery of portraits of sovereigns in Peru, showing continuity from Inca emperors to Spanish monarchs. Published in 1744 by Jorge Juan and Antonio de Ulloa in Relación del Viaje a la América Meridional.

The conquest of the Aztec and Inca Empires ended their sovereignty over their respective territorial expanses, replaced by the Spanish Empire, and Indigenous religious beliefs and practices were suppressed and populations converted to Christianity. The Spanish Empire could not have ruled these vast territories and dense Indigenous populations without utilizing the existing Indigenous political and economic structures at the local level. A key to this was the cooperation between most Indigenous elites with the new ruling structure. The Spanish recognized Indigenous elites as nobles and gave them continuing standing in their communities. Indigenous elites could use the noble titles don and doña, were exempt from the head-tax, and could entail their landholdings into cacicazgos. These elites played an intermediary role between the Spanish rulers and Indigenous commoners. Since in Mesoamerica and the Andean civilizations, Indigenous peoples had existing traditions of payment of tribute and required labor service, the Spanish could tap into these systems to extract wealth. There were few Spaniards and huge Indigenous populations, so utilizing Indigenous intermediaries was a practical solution to the incorporation of the Indigenous population into the new regime of rule. By maintaining hierarchical divisions within communities, Indigenous noblemen were the direct interface between the Indigenous and Spanish spheres and kept their positions so long as they continued to be loyal to the Spanish crown.

The exploitation and demographic catastrophe that Indigenous peoples experienced from Spanish rule in the Caribbean also occurred as Spaniards expanded their control over territories and their Indigenous populations. The crown set the indigenous communities legally apart from Spaniards (as well as Blacks), who made up the República de Españoles, with the creation of the República de Indios. The crown attempted to curb Spaniards' exploitation, banning Spaniards' bequeathing their private grants of Indigenous communities' tribute and encomienda labor in 1542 in the New Laws. In Mexico, the crown established the General Indian Court (Juzgado General de Indios), which heard disputes affecting individual Indigenous as well as indigenous communities. Lawyers for these cases were funded by a half-real tax, an early example of legal aid for the poor. A similar legal apparatus was set up in Lima.

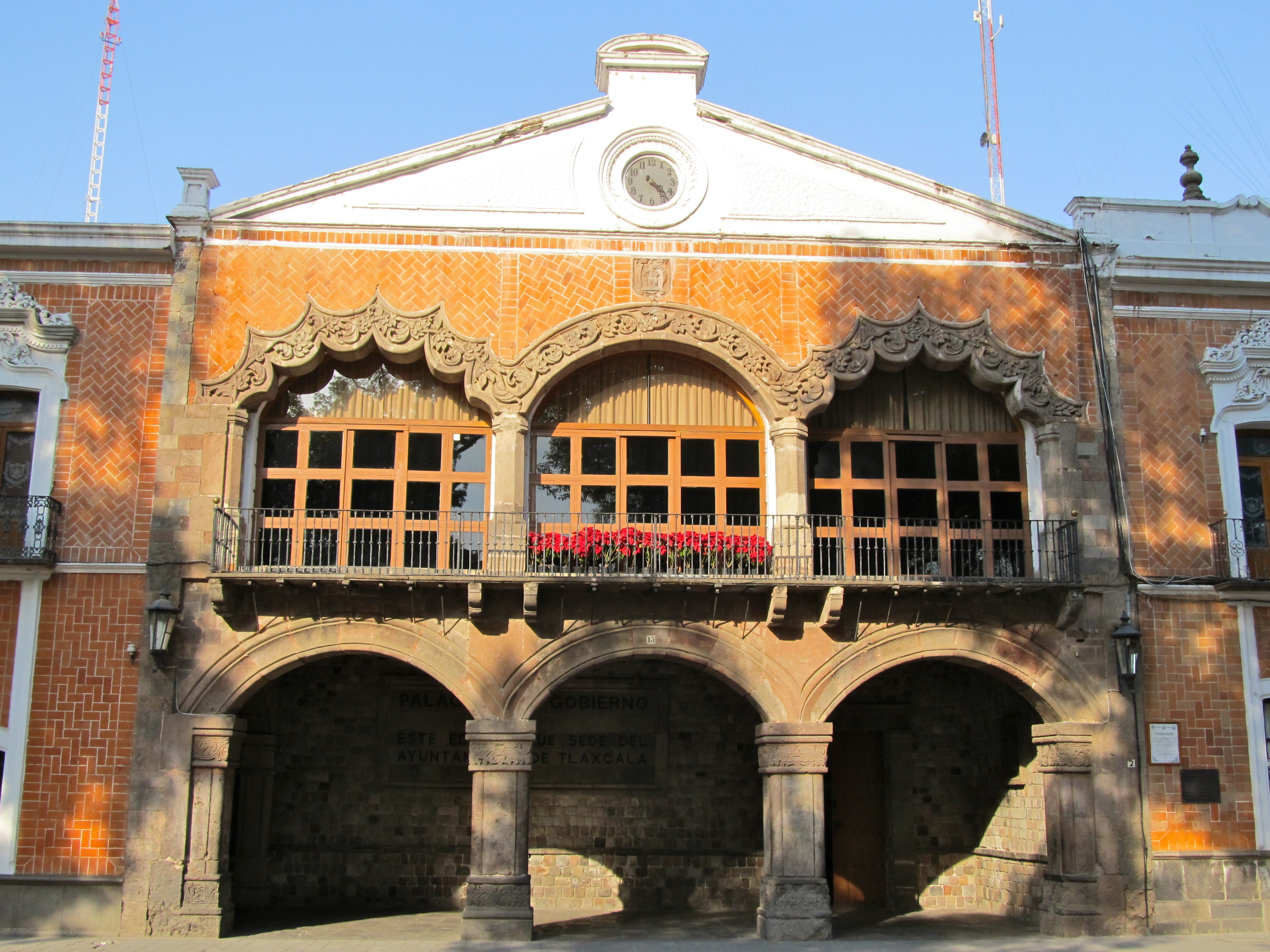
Cabildo building of Tlaxcala, Mexico

The Spaniards systematically attempted to transform structures of indigenous governance to those more closely resembling those of Spaniards, so the indigenous city-state became a Spanish town and the Indigenous noblemen who ruled became officeholders of the town council (cabildo). Although the structure of the Indigenous cabildo looked similar to that of the Spanish institution, its indigenous functionaries continued to follow Indigenous practices. In central Mexico, there exist minutes of the sixteenth-century meetings in Nahuatl of the Tlaxcala cabildo. Indigenous noblemen were particularly important in the early period of colonization, since the economy of the encomienda was initially built on the extraction of tribute and labor from the commoners in their communities. As the colonial economy became more diversified and less dependent on these mechanisms for the accumulation of wealth, the Indigenous noblemen became less important for the economy. However, noblemen became defenders of the rights to land and water controlled by their communities. In colonial Mexico, there are petitions to the king about a variety of issues important to particular Indigenous communities when the noblemen did not get a favorable response from the local friar or priest or local royal officials.

Works by historians in the 20th and 21st centuries have expanded the understanding of the impact of the Spanish conquest and changes during the more than three hundred years of Spanish rule. There are many such works for Mexico, often drawing on native-language documentation in Nahuatl, Mixtec, and Yucatec Maya. For the Andean area, there are an increasing number of publications as well. The history of the Guaraní has also been the subject of a recent study.

In 2000, Pope John Paul II apologized for the wrongs done by the Catholic Church, including those to Indigenous peoples. In 2007 Pope Benedict XVI issued a less sweeping apology for the wrongs done in the conversion of Indigenous peoples.

=== Council of the Indies ===
In 1524, the Council of the Indies was established, following the system of system of Councils that advised the monarch and made decisions on his behalf about specific matters of government. Based in Castile, with the assignment of the governance of the Indies, it was thus responsible for drafting legislation, proposing the appointments to the King for civil government as well as ecclesiastical appointments, and pronouncing judicial sentences; as maximum authority in the overseas territories, the Council of the Indies took over both the institutions in the Indies as the defense of the interests of the Crown, the Catholic Church, and of indigenous peoples. With the 1508 papal grant to the crown of the Patronato real, the crown, rather than the pope, exercised absolute power over the Catholic Church in the Americas and the Philippines, a privilege the crown zealously guarded against erosion or incursion. Crown approval through the Council of the Indies was needed for the establishment of bishoprics, building of churches, appointment of all clerics.

In 1721, at the beginning of the Bourbon monarchy, the crown transferred the main responsibility for governing the overseas empire from the Council of the Indies to the Ministry of the Navy and the Indies, which were subsequently divided into two separate ministries in 1754.

=== Viceroyalties ===
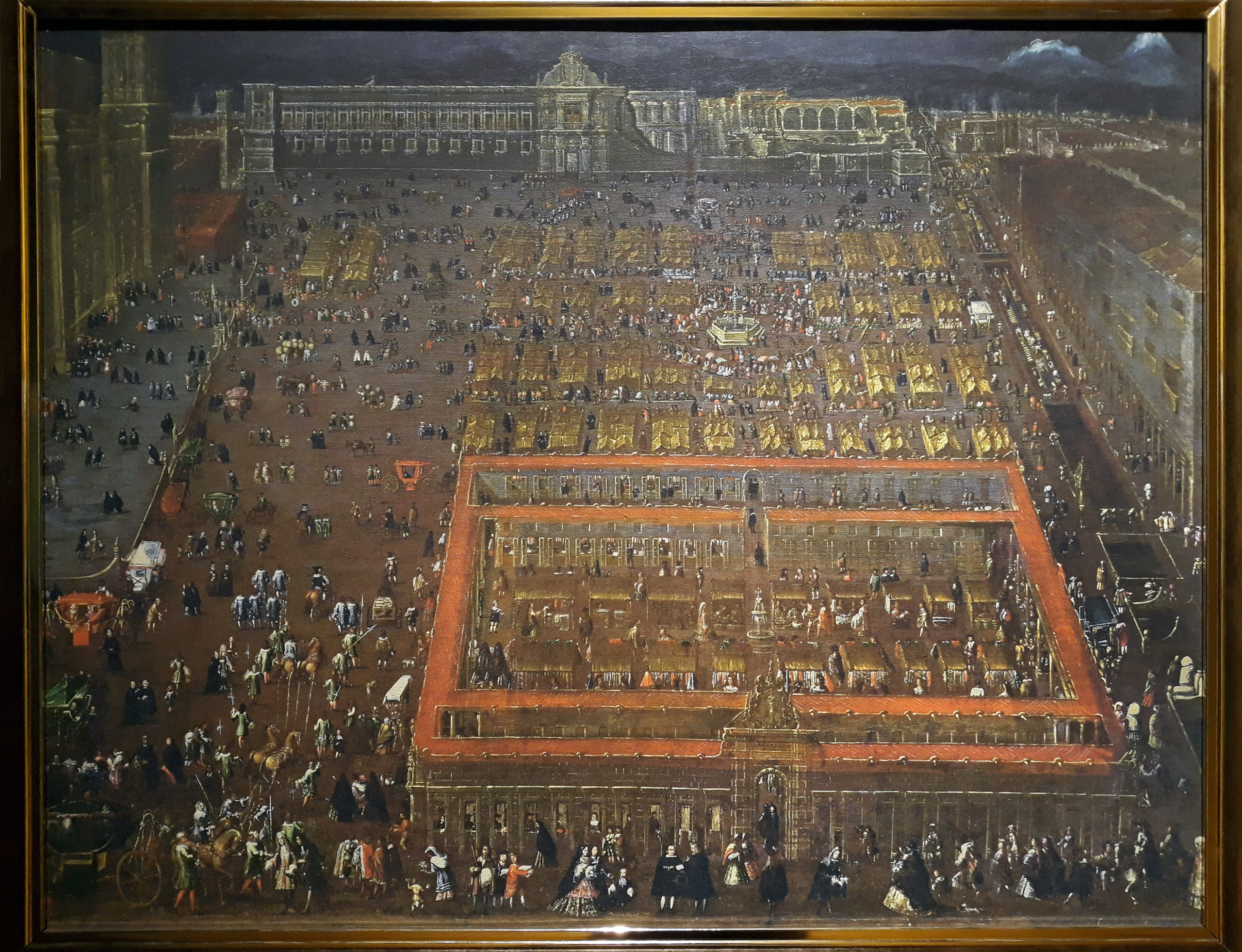
View of the Plaza Mayor of Mexico City and the viceroy's palace, by Cristóbal de Villalpando, 1695

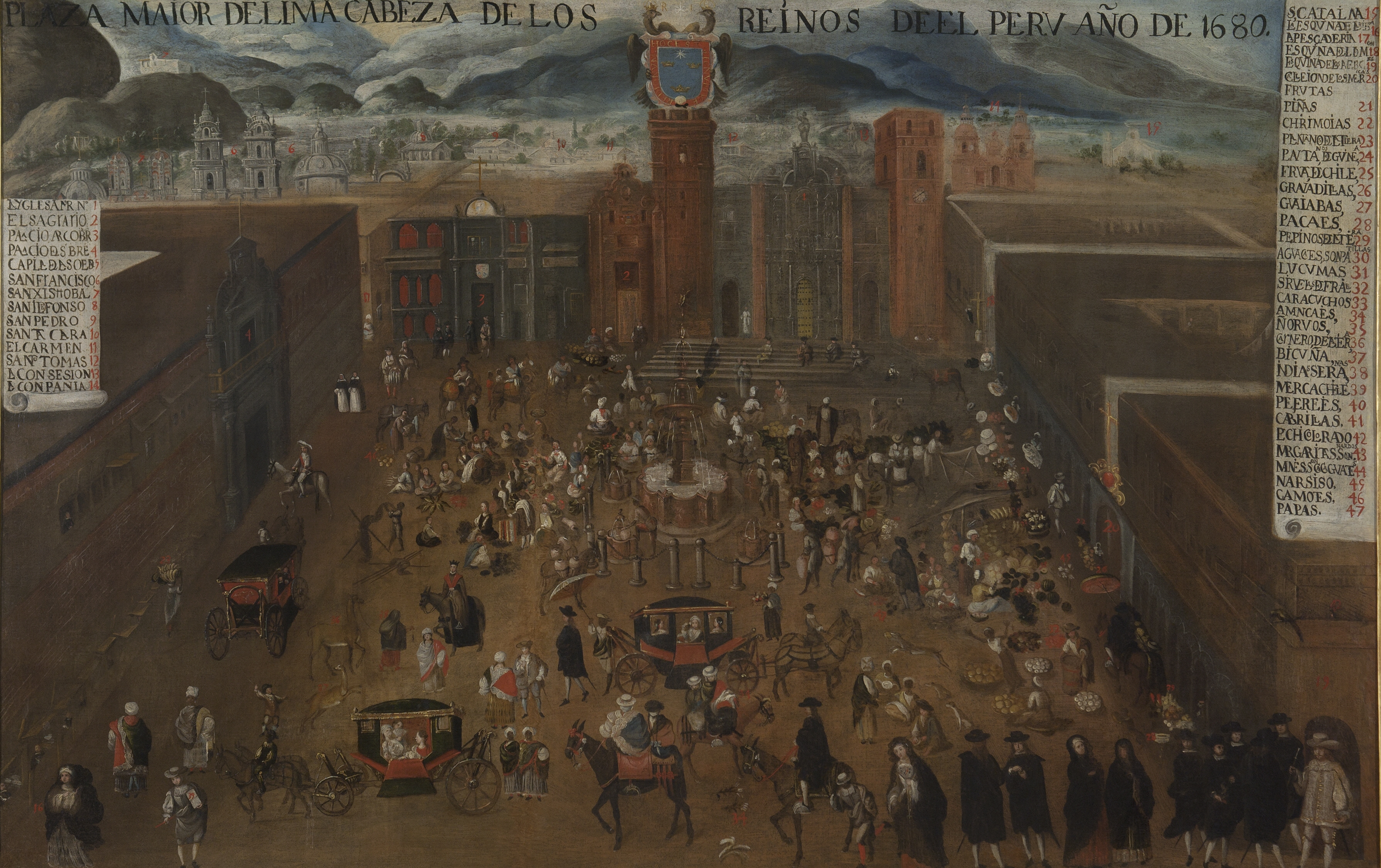
View of the Plaza Mayor, Lima, c. 1680

The impossibility of the physical presence of the monarch and the necessity of strong royal governance in The Indies resulted in the appointment of viceroys ("vice-kings"), the direct representation of the monarch, in both civil and ecclesiastical spheres. Viceroyalties were the largest territory unit of administration in the civil and religious spheres and the boundaries of civil and ecclesiastical governance coincided by design, to ensure crown control over both bureaucracies. Until the eighteenth century, there were just two viceroyalties, with the Viceroyalty of New Spain (founded 1535) administering North America, a portion of the Caribbean, and the Philippines, and the viceroyalty of Peru (founded 1542) having jurisdiction over Spanish South America. Viceroys served as the vice-patron of the Catholic Church, including the Inquisition, established in the seats of the viceroyalties (Mexico City and Lima). Viceroys were responsible for good governance of their territories, economic development, and humane treatment of the indigenous populations.

In the eighteenth-century reforms, the Viceroyalty of Peru was reorganized, splitting off portions to form the Viceroyalty of New Granada (Colombia) (1739) and the Viceroyalty of Rio de la Plata (Argentina) (1776), leaving Peru with jurisdiction over Peru, Charcas, and Chile. Viceroys were of high social standing, almost without exception born in Spain, and served fixed terms.

=== Audiencias, the high courts ===
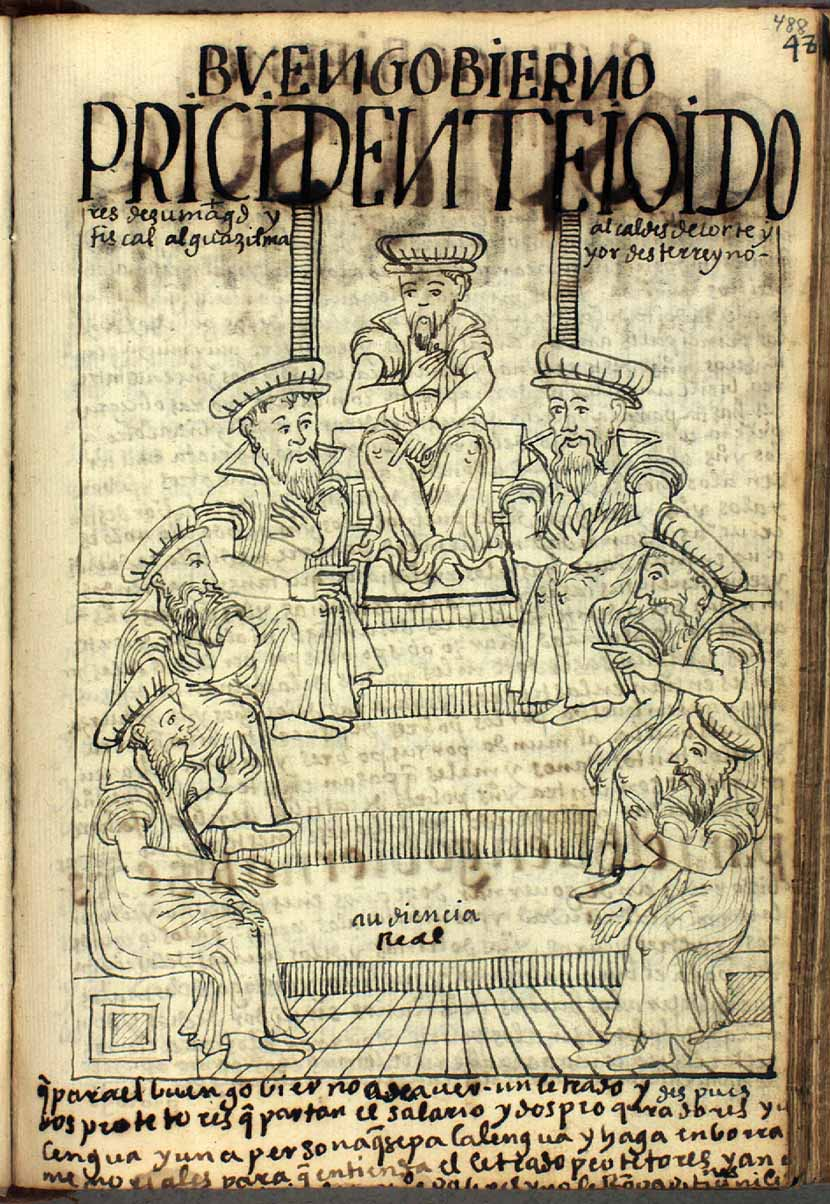
Members of the Real Audiencia (Royal Audience) of Lima, the presidente, alcaldes de corte, fiscal, and alguacil mayor (Nueva Crónica y Buen Gobierno, p. 488)

The Audiencias were initially constituted by the crown as a key administrative institution with royal authority and loyalty to the crown as opposed to conquerors and first settlers. Although constituted as the highest judicial authority in their territorial jurisdiction, they also had executive and legislative authority, and served as the executive on an interim basis. Judges (oidores) held "formidable power. Their role in judicial affairs and in overseeing the implementation of royal legislation made their decisions important for the communities they served." Since their appointments were for life or the pleasure of the monarch, they had a continuity of power and authority that viceroys and captains-general lacked because of their shorter-term appointments. They were the "center of the administrative system [and] gave the government of the Indies a strong basis of permanence and continuity."

Their main function was judicial, as a court of justice of second instance – court of appeal – in penal and civil matters, but also the Audiencias were courts the first instance in the city where it had its headquarters, and also in the cases involving the Royal Treasury. Besides court of justice, the Audiencias had functions of government as counterweight the authority of the viceroys, since they could communicate with both the Council of the Indies and the king without the requirement of requesting authorization from the viceroy. This direct correspondence of the Audiencia with the Council of the Indies made it possible for the council to give the Audiencia direction on general aspects of government.

Audiencias were a significant base of power and influence for American-born elites, starting in the late sixteenth century, with nearly a quarter of appointees being born in the Indies by 1687. During a financial crisis in the late seventeenth century, the crown began selling Audiencia appointments, and American-born Spaniards held 45% of Audiencia appointments. Although there were restrictions of appointees' ties to local elite society and participation in the local economy, they acquired dispensations from the cash-strapped crown. Audiencia judgments and other functions became more tied to the locality and less to the crown and impartial justice.

During the Bourbon Reforms in the mid-eighteenth century, the crown systematically sought to centralize power in its own hands and diminish that of its overseas possessions, appointing peninsular-born Spaniards to Audiencias. American-born elite men complained bitterly about the change, since they lost access to power that they had enjoyed for nearly a century.

=== Civil administrative districts, provinces ===
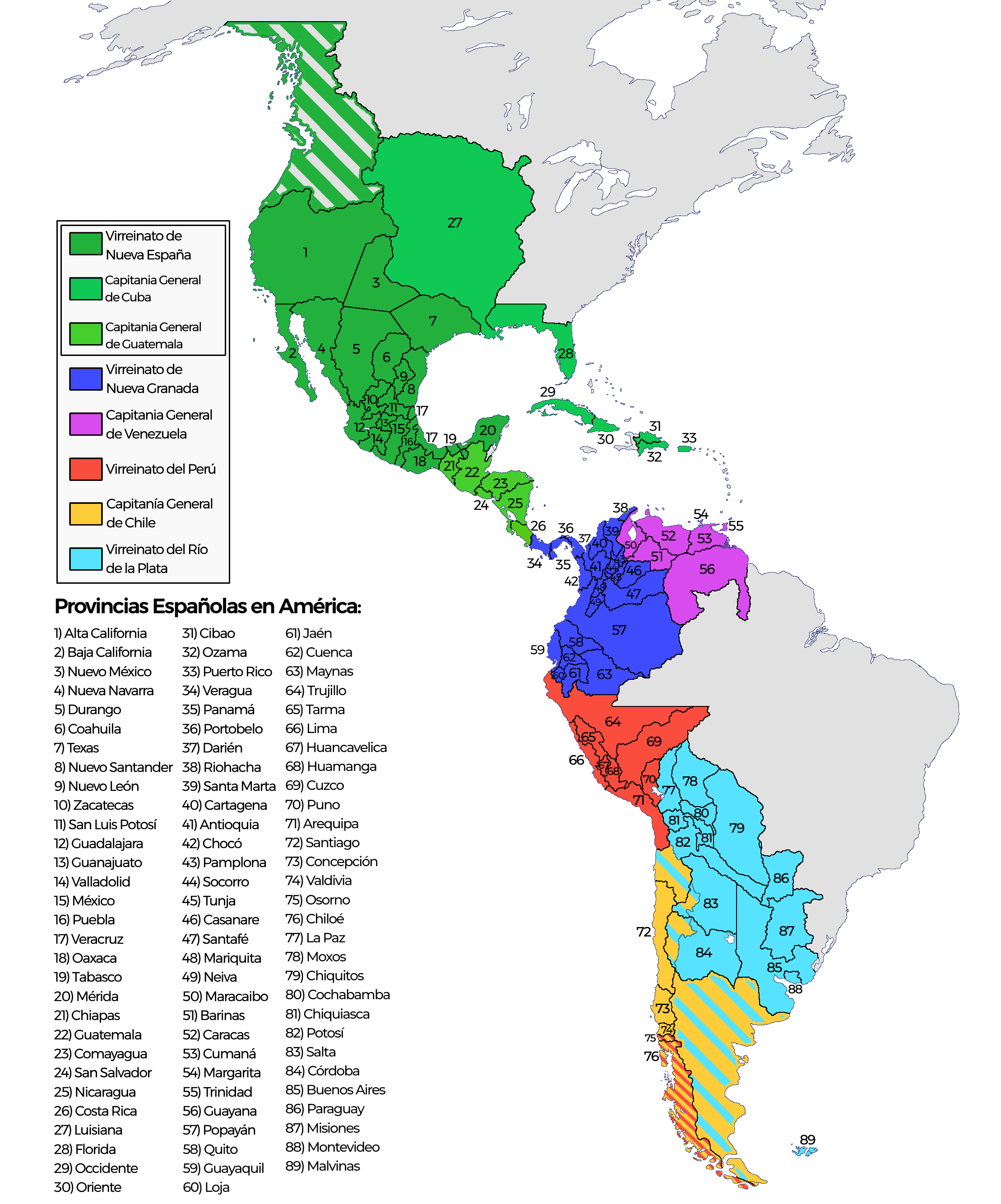
Map of Spanish America c. 1800, showing the four viceroyalties (New Spain, pink), (New Granada, green), (Peru, red), (Río de la Plata, blue); four captaincies general (Cuba, turquoise), (Guatemala, Yellowish green), (Venezuela, purple), (Chile, yellow), and provincial divisions

During the early era and under the Habsburgs, the crown established a regional layer of colonial jurisdiction in the institution of Corregimiento, which was between the Audiencia and town councils. Corregimiento expanded "royal authority from the urban centers into the countryside and over the indigenous population." As with many colonial institutions, corregimiento had its roots in Castile when the Catholic Monarchs centralize power over municipalities. In the Indies, corregimiento initially functioned to bring control over Spanish settlers who exploited the indigenous populations held in encomienda, in order to protect the shrinking indigenous populations and prevent the formation of an aristocracy of conquerors and powerful settlers. The royal official in charge of a district was the Corregidor, who was appointed by the viceroy, usually for a five-year term. Corregidores collected the tribute from indigenous communities and regulated forced indigenous labor. Alcaldías mayores were larger districts with a royal appointee, the Alcalde mayor.

As the indigenous populations declined, the need for corregimiento decreased and then suppressed, with the alcaldía mayor remaining an institution until it was replaced in the 18th-century Bourbon Reforms by royal officials, Intendants. The salary of officials during the Habsburg era were paltry, but the corregidor or alcalde mayor in densely populated areas of indigenous settlement with a valuable product could use his office for personal enrichment. As with many other royal posts, these positions were sold, starting in 1677. The Bourbon-era intendants were appointed and relatively well paid.

=== Cabildos or town councils ===
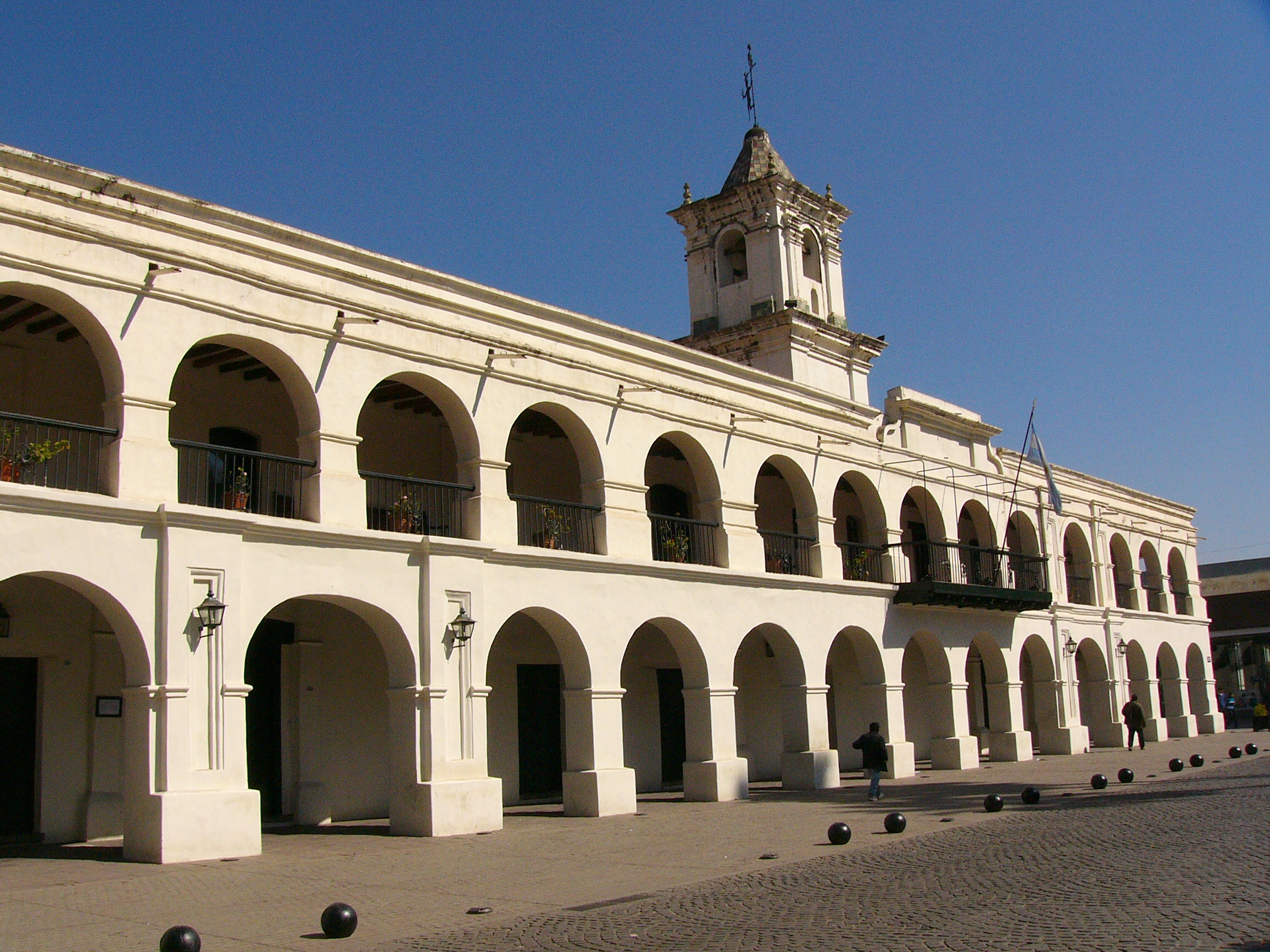
Cabildo in the city of Salta (Argentina)

Spanish settlers sought to live in towns and cities, with governance being accomplished through the town council or Cabildo. The cabildo was composed of the prominent residents (vecinos) of the municipality, so that governance was restricted to a male elite, with majority of the population exercising power. Cities were governed on the same pattern as in Spain and in the Indies the city was the framework of Spanish life. The cities were Spanish and the countryside indigenous. In areas of previous indigenous empires with settled populations, the crown also melded existing indigenous rule into a Spanish pattern, with the establishment of cabildos and the participation of indigenous elites as officials holding Spanish titles. There were a variable number of councilors (regidores), depending on the size of the town, also two municipal judges (alcaldes menores), who were judges of first instance, and also other officials as police chief, inspector of supplies, court clerk, and a public herald. They were in charge of distributing land to the neighbors, establishing local taxes, dealing with the public order, inspecting jails and hospitals, preserving the roads and public works such as irrigation ditches and bridges, supervising public health, regulating festive activities, monitoring market prices, or the protection of Indians.

After the reign of Philip II, the municipal offices, including the councilors, were auctioned to alleviate the need for money of the Crown, even the offices could also be sold, which became hereditary, so that the government of the cities went on to hands of urban oligarchies. In order to control the municipal life, the Crown ordered the appointment of corregidores and alcaldes mayores to exert greater political control and judicial functions in minor districts. Their functions were governing the respective municipalities, administering of justice and being appellate judges in the alcaldes menores' judgments, but only the corregidor could preside over the cabildo. However, both charges were also put up for sale freely since the late 16th century.

Most Spanish settlers came to the Indies as permanent residents, established families and businesses, and sought advancement in the colonial system, such as membership of cabildos, so that they were in the hands of local, American-born (crillo) elites. During the Bourbon era, even when the crown systematically appointed peninsular-born Spaniards to royal posts rather than American-born, the cabildos remained in the hands of local elites.

=== Frontier institutions – presidio and mission ===
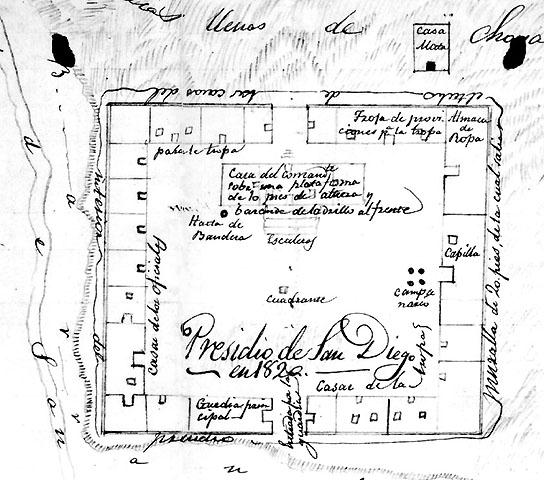
The San Diego presidio in California

As the empire expanded into areas of less dense indigenous populations, the crown created a chain of presidios, military forts or garrisons, that provided Spanish settlers protection from Indian attacks. In Mexico during the sixteenth-century Chichimec War guarded the transit of silver from the mines of Zacatecas to Mexico City. As many as 60 salaried soldiers were garrisoned in presidios. Presidios had a resident commanders, who set up commercial enterprises of imported merchandise, selling it to soldiers as well as Indian allies.

The other frontier institution was the religious mission to convert the indigenous populations. Missions were established with royal authority through the Patronato real. The Jesuits were effective missionaries in frontier areas until their expulsion from Spain and its empire in 1767. The Franciscans took over some former Jesuit missions and continued the expansion of areas incorporated into the empire. Although their primary focus was on religious conversion, missionaries served as "diplomatic agents, peace emissaries to hostile tribes ... and they were also expected to hold the line against nomadic nonmissionary Indians as well as other European powers." On the frontier of empire, Indians were seen as sin razón, ("without reason"); non-Indian populations were described as gente de razón ("people of reason"), who could be mixed-race castas or black and had greater social mobility in frontier regions.

== Catholic Church organization ==
Christian evangelization of non-Christian peoples was a key factor in Spaniards' justification of the conquest of indigenous peoples in what was called "the spiritual conquest". In 2000, Pope John Paul II apologized for errors committed by the Catholic Church, including forced conversion.

=== Early evangelization ===
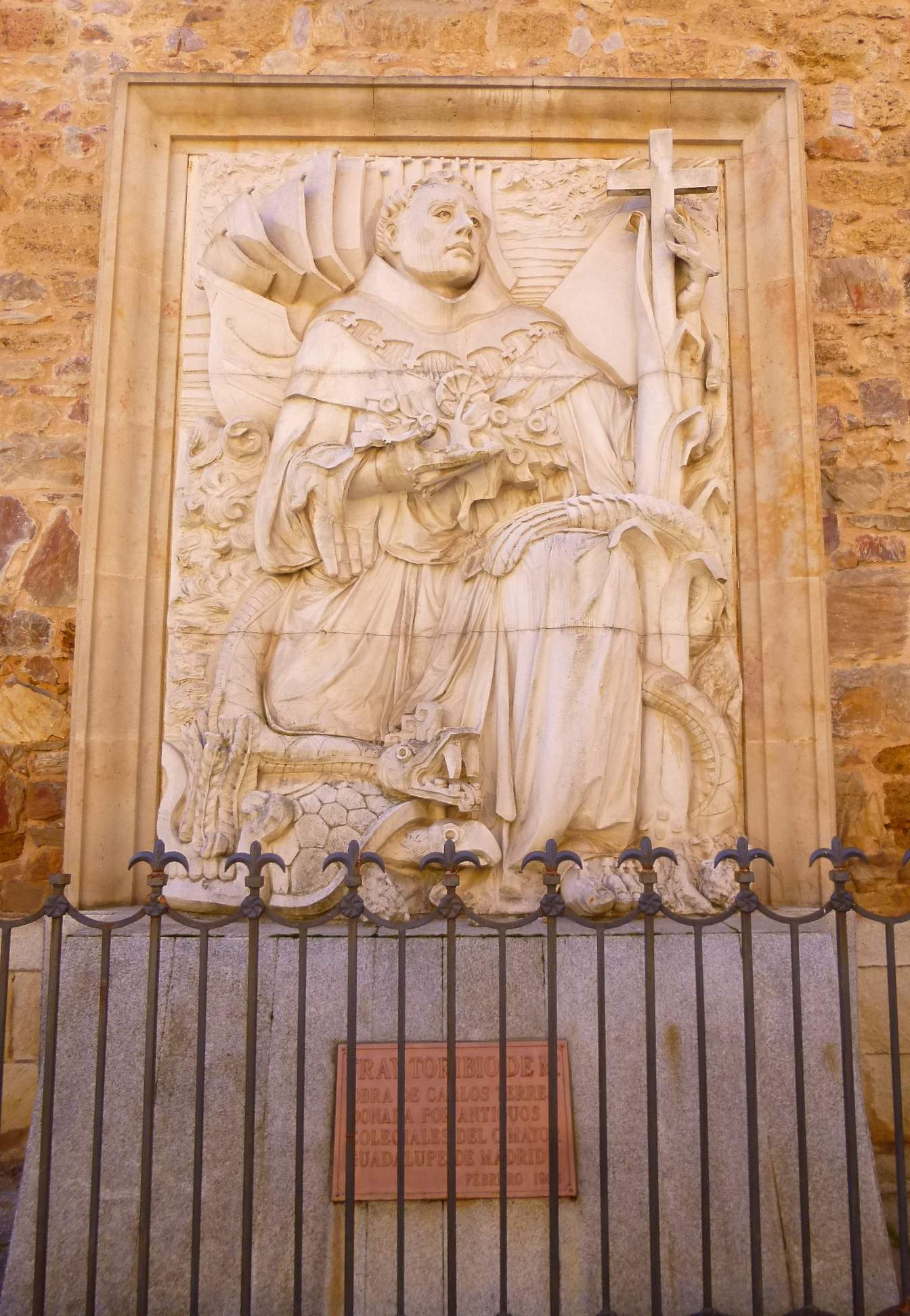
Modern bas-relief of Franciscan friar Motolinia

During the early colonial period, the crown authorized friars of Catholic religious orders (Franciscans, Dominicans, and Augustinians) to function as priests during the conversion of indigenous populations. During the early Age of Discovery, the diocesan clergy in Spain was poorly educated and considered of a low moral standing, and the Catholic Monarchs were reluctant to allow them to spearhead evangelization. Each order set up networks of parishes in the various regions (provinces), sited in existing indigenous settlements, where Christian churches were built and where evangelization of the indigenous was based. Hernán Cortés requested Franciscan and Dominican friars be sent to New Spain immediately after the conquest of Tenochtitlan to begin evangelization. The Franciscans arrived first in 1525 in a group of twelve, the Twelve Apostles of Mexico. Among this first group was Toribio de Benavente, known now as Motolinia, the Nahuatl word for poor.

=== Establishment of the church hierarchy ===
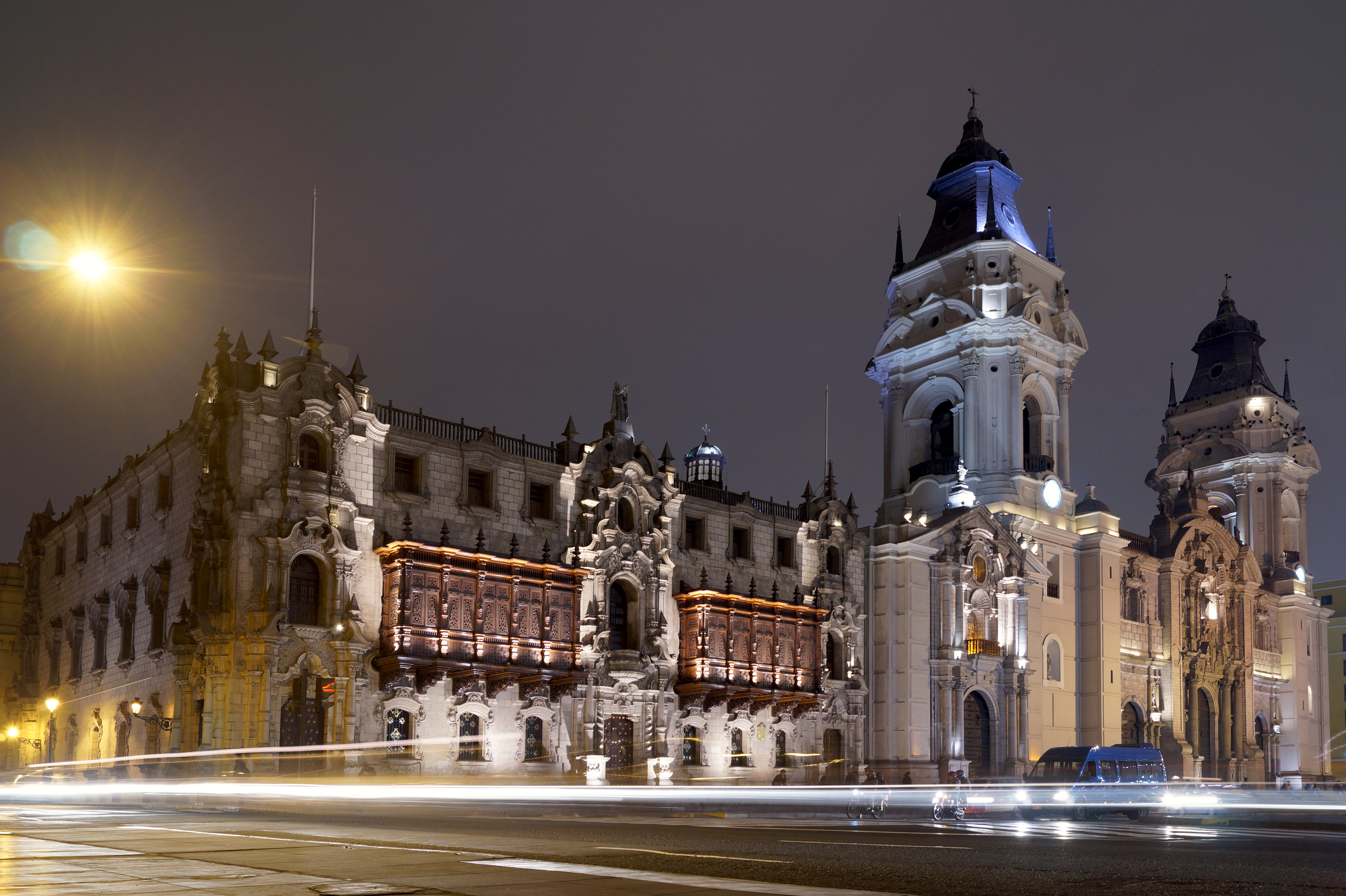
Lima Cathedral, construction begun in 1535, completed 1649

After the 1550s, the crown increasingly favored the diocesan clergy over the religious orders. The diocesan clergy (also called the secular clergy) were under the direct authority of bishops, who were appointed by the crown, through the power granted by the pope in the Patronato real. Religious orders had their own internal regulations and leadership. The crown had authority to draw the boundaries for dioceses and parishes. The creation of the ecclesiastical hierarchy of the diocesan clergy marked a turning point in the crown's control over the religious sphere. The structure of the hierarchy was in many ways parallel to that of civil governance. The pope was the head of the Catholic Church, but the granting of the Patronato real to the Spanish monarchy gave the king the power of appointment (patronage) of ecclesiastics. The monarch was head of the civil and religious hierarchies. The capital city of a viceroyalty became of the seat of the archbishop. The region overseen by the archbishop was divided into large units, the diocese, headed by a bishop. The diocese was in turn divided into smaller units, the parish, staffed by a parish priest.

In 1574, Philip II promulgated the Order of Patronage (Ordenaza del Patronato) ordering the religious orders to turn over their parishes to the secular clergy, a policy that secular clerics had long sought for the central areas of empire, with their large indigenous populations. Although implementation was slow and incomplete, it was an assertion of royal power over the clergy and the quality of parish priests improved, since the Ordenanza mandated competitive examination to fill vacant positions. Religious orders along with the Jesuits then embarked on further evangelization in frontier regions of the empire.

=== Jesuits ===
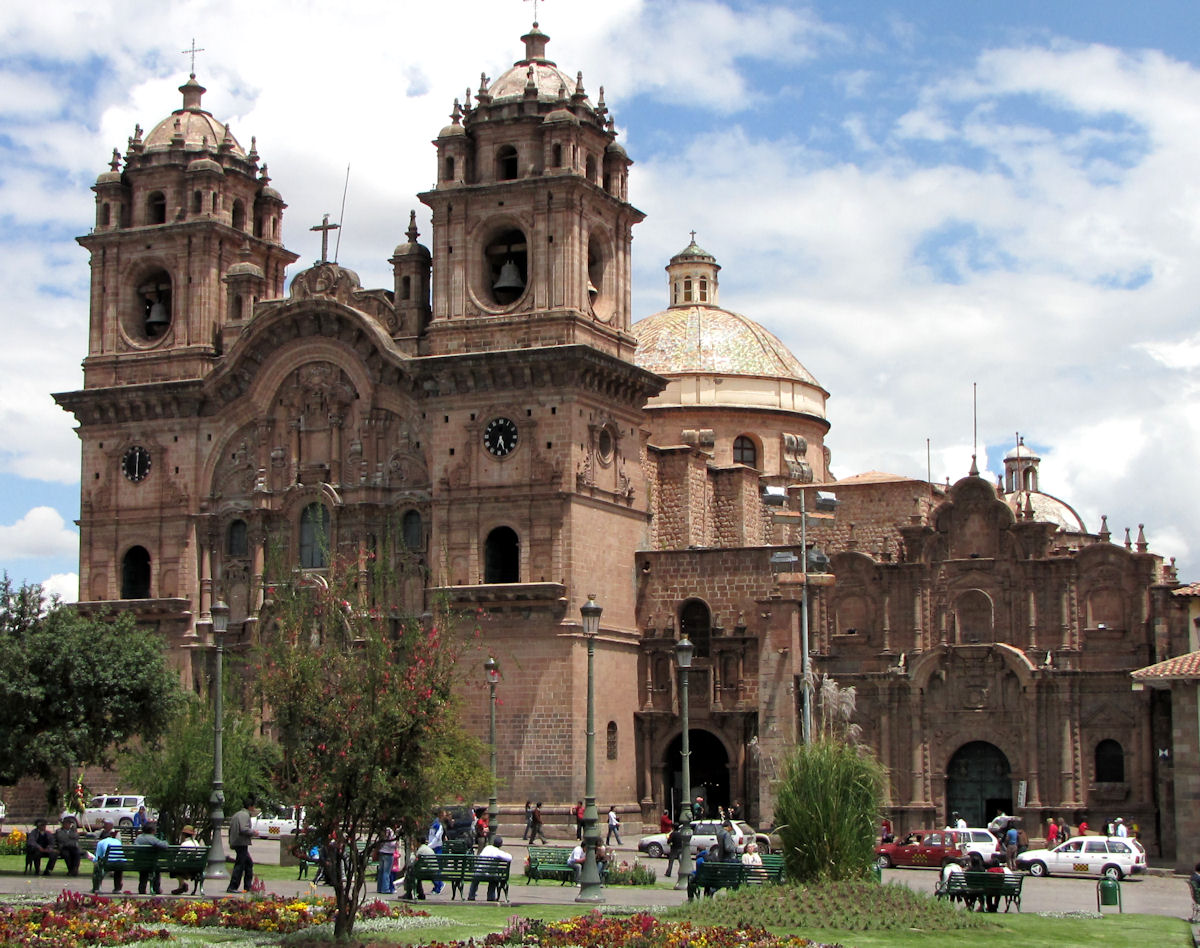
Church of la Companía Society of Jesus in Cuzco, Peru

The Jesuits resisted crown control, refusing to pay the tithe on their estates that supported the ecclesiastical hierarchy and came into conflict with bishops. The most prominent example is in Puebla, Mexico, when Bishop Juan de Palafox y Mendoza was driven from his bishopric by the Jesuits. The bishop challenged the Jesuits' continuing to hold Indian parishes and function as priests without the required royal licenses. His fall from power is viewed as an example of the weakening of the crown in the mid-seventeenth century since it failed to protect their duly appointed bishop. The crown expelled the Jesuits from Spain and The Indies in 1767 during the Bourbon Reforms.

=== Holy Office of the Inquisition ===
Inquisitional powers were initially vested in bishops, who could root out idolatry and heresy. In Mexico, Bishop Juan de Zumárraga prosecuted and had executed in 1539 a Nahua lord, known as Don Carlos of Texcoco for apostasy and sedition for having converted to Christianity and then renounced his conversion and urged others to do so as well. Zumárraga was reprimanded for his actions as exceeding his authority. When the formal institution of the Inquisition was established in 1571, indigenous peoples were excluded from its jurisdiction on the grounds that they were neophytes, new converts, and not capable of understanding religious doctrine.

== Society ==
=== Demographic impact of colonization ===
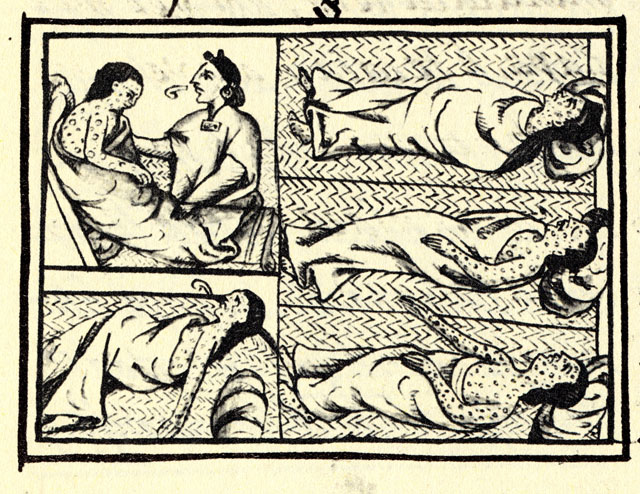
Depiction of smallpox in Book XII of the 16th-century Florentine Codex (compiled 1540–1585) in conquest-era central Mexico suffering from smallpox

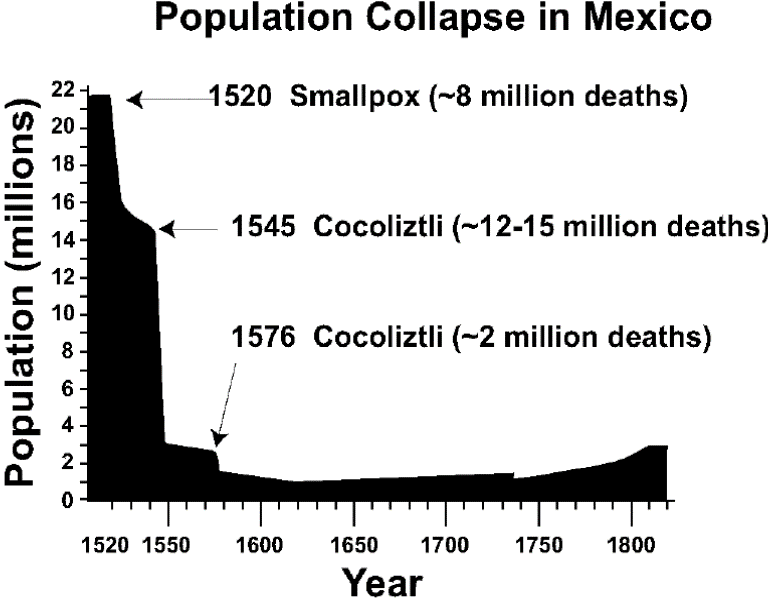
Population collapse in Mexico

It has been estimated that over 1.86 million Spaniards emigrated to the Americas in the period between 1492 and 1824, with millions more continuing to immigrate following independence.

Native populations declined significantly during the period of Spanish expansion. In Hispaniola, the indigenous Taíno pre-contact population before the arrival of Columbus of several hundred thousand had declined to sixty thousand by 1509. The population of the Native American population in Mexico declined by an estimated 90% (reduced to 1–2.5 million people) by the early 17th century. In Peru, the indigenous Amerindian pre-contact population of around 6.5 million declined to 1 million by the early 17th century. The overwhelming cause of the decline in both Mexico and Peru was infectious diseases, such as smallpox and measles, although the brutality of the encomienda also played a significant part in the population decline.

Of the history of the indigenous population of California, Sherburne F. Cook (1896–1974) was the most painstakingly careful researcher. From decades of research, he made estimates for the pre-contact population and the history of demographic decline during the Spanish and post-Spanish periods. According to Cook, the indigenous Californian population at first contact, in 1769, was about 310,000 and had dropped to 25,000 by 1910. The vast majority of the decline happened after the Spanish period, during the Mexican and US periods of Californian history (1821–1910), with the most dramatic collapse (200,000 to 25,000) occurring in the US period (1846–1910).

=== Spanish American populations and race ===
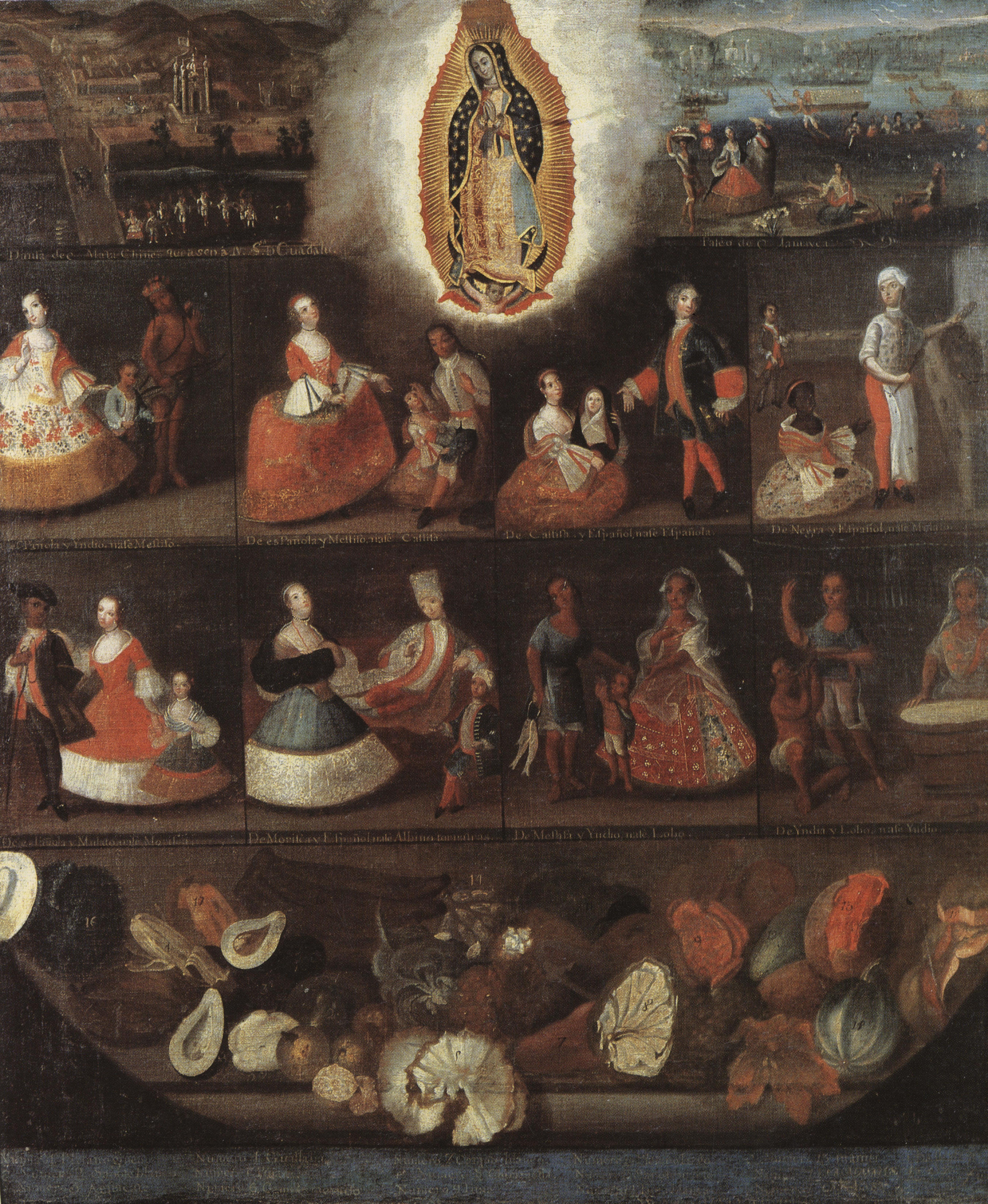
Luis de Mena, Virgin of Guadalupe, and racial hierarchy, 1750. Museo de América, Madrid.

The largest population in Spanish America was and remained indigenous, what Spaniards called "Indians" (indios), a category that did not exist before the arrival of the Europeans. The Spanish Crown separated them into the República de Indios. Europeans immigrated from various provinces of Spain, with initial waves of emigration consisting of more men than women. They were referred to as Españoles and Españolas, and later being differentiated by the terms indicating place of birth, peninsular for those born in Spain; criollo/criolla or Americano/Ameriana for those born in the Americas. Enslaved Africans were imported to Spanish territories, primarily to Cuba. As was the case in peninsular Spain, Africans (negros) were able buy their freedom (horro), so that in most of the empire free Blacks and Mulatto (Black + Spanish) populations outnumbered slave populations. Spaniards and Indigenous parents produced Mestizo offspring, who were also part of the República de Españoles.

== Economy ==
=== Early economy of indigenous tribute and labor ===
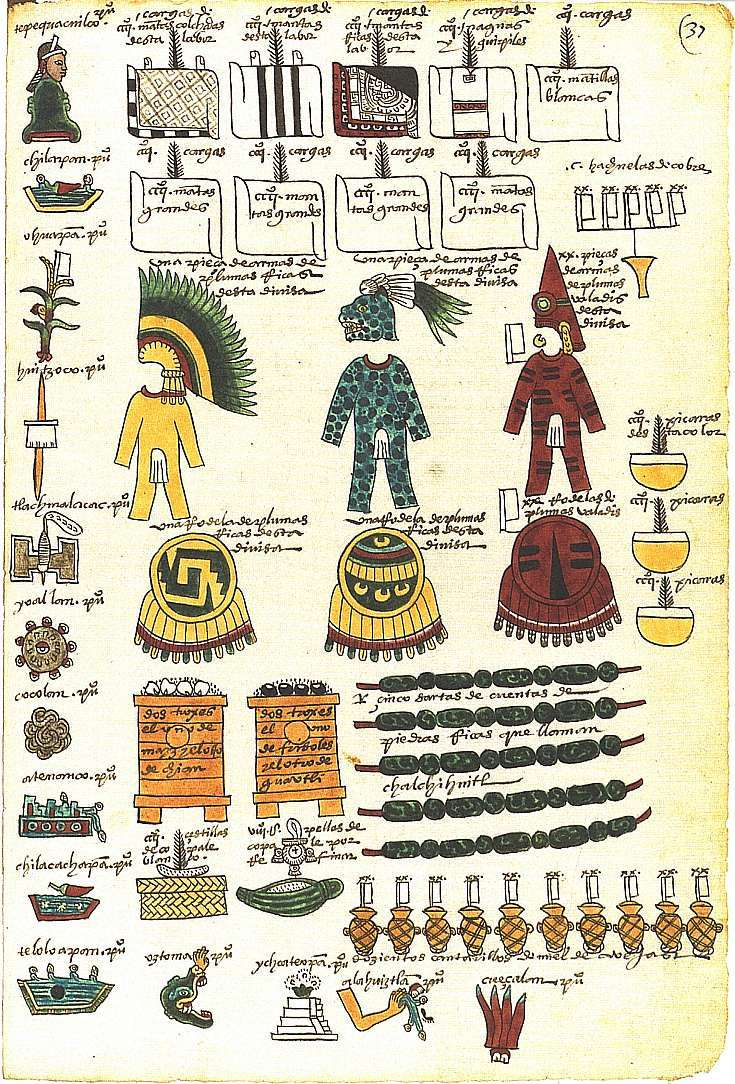
Tribute from one region of the Aztec Empire as shown in Codex Mendoza

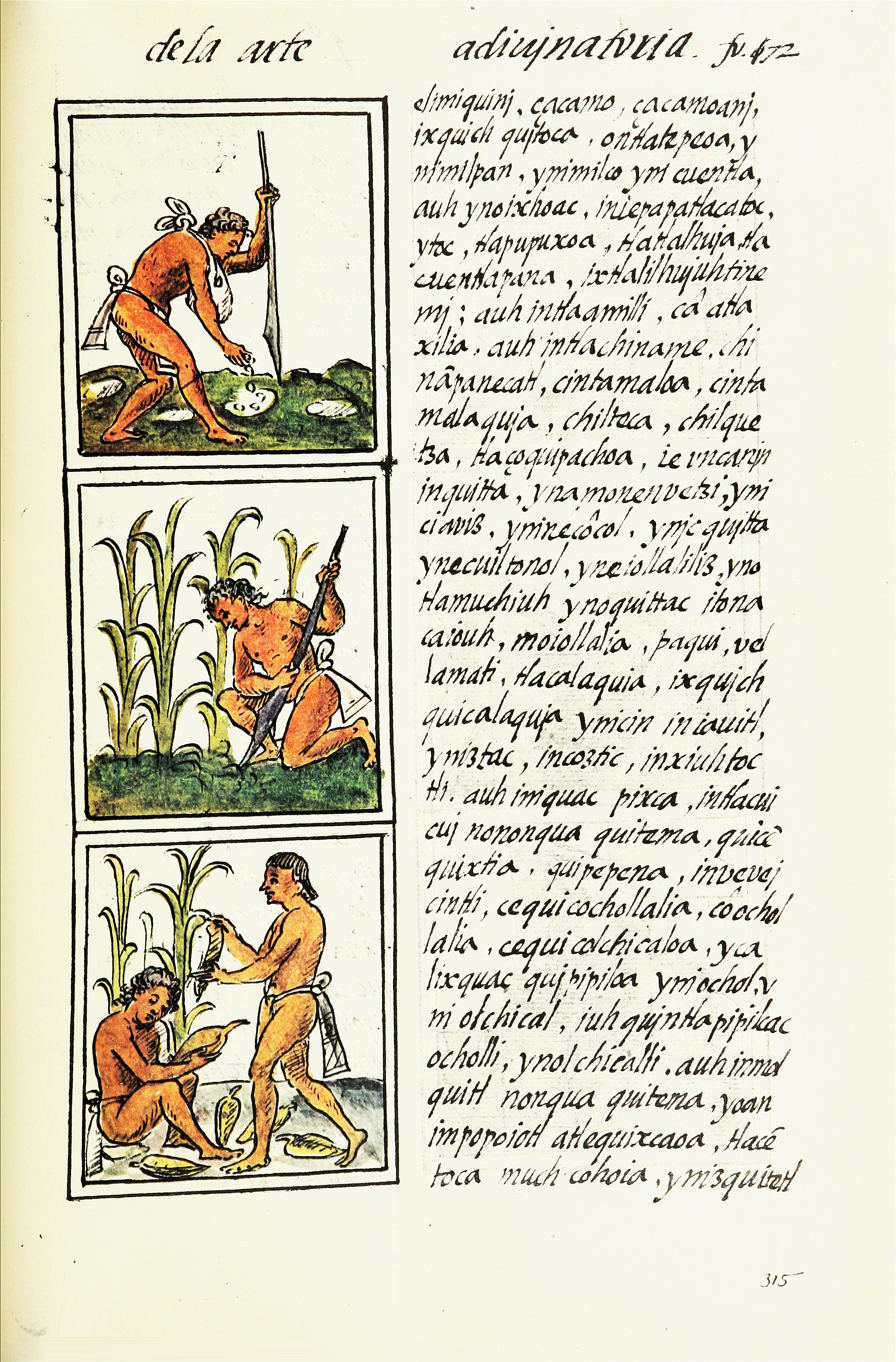
Aztec maize agriculture as depicted in the Florentine Codex (1576)

In areas of dense, stratified indigenous populations, especially Mesoamerica and the Andean region, Spanish conquerors awarded perpetual private grants of labor and tribute to particular indigenous settlements, in encomienda they were in a privileged position to accumulate private wealth. Spaniards had some knowledge of the existing indigenous practices of labor and tribute, so that learning in more detail what tribute particular regions delivered to the Aztec Empire prompted the creation of Codex Mendoza, a codification for Spanish use. The rural regions remained highly indigenous, with little interface between the large numbers of indigenous and the small numbers of the República de Españoles, which included Blacks and mixed-race castas. Tribute goods in Mexico were most usually lengths of cotton cloth, woven by women, and maize and other foodstuffs produced by men. These could be sold in markets and thereby converted to cash. In the early period for Spaniards, formal ownership of land was less important than control of indigenous labor and receiving tribute. Spaniards had seen the disappearance of the indigenous populations in the Caribbean, and with that, the disappearance of their main source of wealth, propelling Spaniards to expand their regions of control. With the conquests of the Aztec and Inca empires, large numbers of Spaniards emigrated from the Iberian peninsula to seek their fortune or to pursue better economic conditions for themselves. The establishment of large, permanent Spanish settlements attracted a whole range of new residents, who set up shop as carpenters, bakers, tailors and other artisan activities.

=== Sugar and slavery ===
The early Caribbean proved a massive disappointment for Spaniards, who had hoped to find mineral wealth and exploitable indigenous populations. Gold existed in only small amounts, and the indigenous peoples died off in massive numbers. For the colony's continued existence, a reliable source of labor was needed. That was of enslaved Africans. Cane sugar imported from the Old World was a high value, a low bulk export product that became the bulwark of tropical economies of the Caribbean islands and coastal Tierra Firme (the Spanish Main), as well as Portuguese Brazil.

=== Silver ===
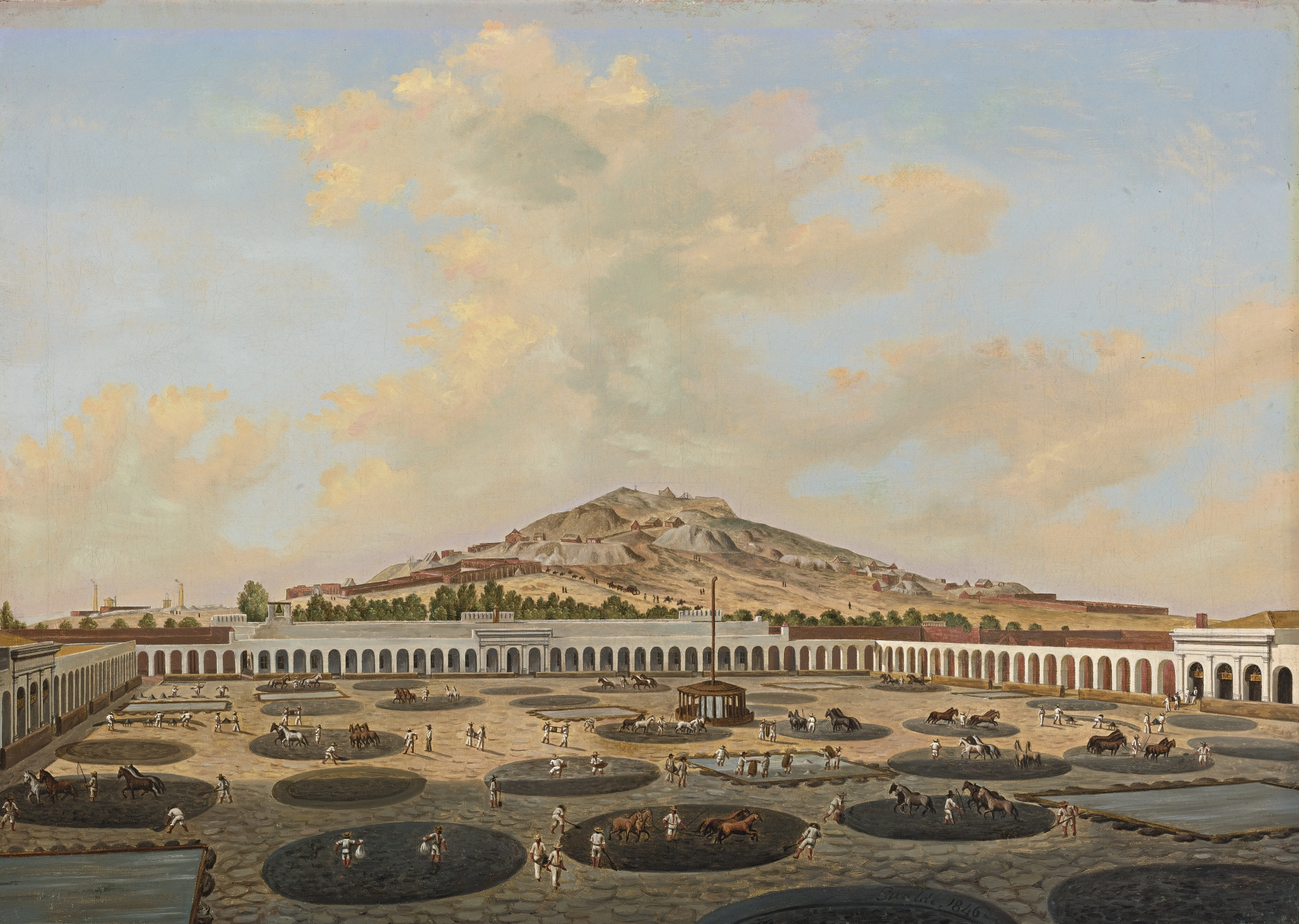
Depiction of the patio process at the Hacienda Nueva de Fresnillo, Zacatecas, Pietro Gualdi, 1846

Silver was the bonanza the Spaniards sought. Large deposits were found in a single mountain in the viceroyalty of Peru, the Cerro Rico, in what is now Bolivia, and in several places outside of the dense indigenous zone of settlement in northern Mexico, Zacatecas, and Guanajuato. In the Andes, Viceroy Francisco de Toledo revived the indigenous rotary labor system of the mita to supply labor for silver mining. In Mexico, the labor force had to be lured from elsewhere in the colony, and was not based on traditional systems of rotary labor. In Mexico, refining took place in haciendas de minas, where silver ore was refined into pure silver by amalgamation with mercury in what was known as the patio process. Ore was crushed with the aid of mules and then mercury could be applied to draw out the pure silver. Mercury was a monopoly of the crown. In Peru, the Cerro Rico's ore was processed from the local mercury mine of Huancavelica, while in Mexico mercury was imported from the Almadén mercury mine in Spain. Mercury is a neurotoxin, which damaged and killed human and mules coming into contact with it. In the Huancavelica region, mercury continues to wreak ecological damage.

=== Development of agriculture and ranching ===
To feed urban populations and mining workforces, small-scale farms (ranchos), (estancias), and large-scale enterprises (haciendas) emerged to fill the demand, especially for foodstuffs that Spaniards wanted to eat, most especially wheat. In areas of sparse population, ranching of cattle (ganado mayor) and smaller livestock (ganado menor) such as sheep and goats ranged widely and were largely feral. There is debate about the impact of ranching on the environment in the colonial era, with sheep herding being called out for its negative impact, while others contest that. With only a small labor force to draw on, ranching was an ideal economic activity for some regions. Most agriculture and ranching supplied local needs, since transportation was difficult, slow, and expensive. Only the most valuable low bulk products would be exported.

=== Agricultural export products ===
Cacao beans for chocolate emerged as an export product as Europeans developed a taste for sweetened chocolate. Another important export product was cochineal, a color-fast red dye made from dried insects living on cacti. It became the second-most valuable export from Spanish America after silver.

== 19th century ==
Development of Spanish American Independence Government under traditional Spanish law Loyal to Supreme Central Junta or Cortes American junta or insurrection movement Independent state declared or established Height of French control of the Peninsula

During the Napoleonic Peninsular War in Europe between France and Spain, assemblies called juntas were established to rule in the name of Ferdinand VII of Spain. The Libertadores (Spanish and Portuguese for "Liberators") were the principal leaders of the Spanish American wars of independence. They were predominantly criollos (Americas-born people of European ancestry, mostly Spanish or Portuguese), bourgeois and influenced by liberalism and in some cases with military training in the mother country.

In 1809 the first declarations of independence from Spanish rule occurred in the Viceroyalty of Peru. The first two were in Upper Peru, present-day Bolivia, at Charcas (present day Sucre, 25 May), and La Paz (16 July); and the third in present-day Ecuador at Quito (10 August). In 1810 Mexico declared independence, with the Mexican War of Independence following for over a decade. In 1821 Treaty of Córdoba established Mexican independence from Spain and concluded the War. The Plan of Iguala was part of the peace treaty to establish a constitutional foundation for an independent Mexico.

These began a movement for colonial independence that spread to Spain's other colonies in the Americas. The ideas from the French and the American Revolution influenced the efforts. All of the colonies, except Cuba and Puerto Rico, attained independence by the 1820s. The British Empire offered support, wanting to end the Spanish monopoly on trade with its colonies in the Americas.

In 1898, the United States achieved victory in the Spanish–American War with Spain, ending the Spanish colonial era. Spanish possession and rule of its remaining colonies in the Americas ended in that year with its sovereignty transferred to the United States. The United States took occupation of Cuba, the Philippines, and Puerto Rico. Puerto Rico continues to be a possession of the United States, now officially continues as a self-governing unincorporated territory.

== In popular culture ==
In the twentieth century, there have been a number of films depicting the life of Christopher Columbus. One in 1949 stars Fredric March as Columbus. With the 1992 commemoration (and critique) of Columbus, more cinematic and television depictions of the era appeared, including a television miniseries with Gabriel Byrne as Columbus. Christopher Columbus: The Discovery (1992) has Georges Corroface as Columbus with Marlon Brando as Tomás de Torquemada and Tom Selleck as King Ferdinand and Rachel Ward as Queen Isabela. 1492: The Conquest of Paradise stars Gérard Depardieu as Columbus and Sigourney Weaver as Queen Isabel. A 2010 film, Even the Rain starring Gael García Bernal, is set in modern Cochabamba, Bolivia during the Cochabamba Water War, following a film crew shooting a controversial life of Columbus. A 1995 Bolivian-made film is in some ways similar to Even the Rain is To Hear the Birds Singing, with a modern film crew going to an indigenous settlement to shoot a film about the Spanish conquest and end up replicating aspects of the conquest.

For the conquest of the Aztec Empire, the 2019 eight-episode Mexican television miniseries Hernán depicts such historical events. Other notable historical figures in the production are Malinche, Cortés cultural translator, and other conquerors Pedro de Alvarado, Cristóbal de Olid, Bernal Díaz del Castillo. Showing the indigenous sides are Xicotencatl, a leader of the Spaniards' Tlaxcalan allies, and Aztec emperors Moctezuma II and Cuitláhuac. The story of Doña Marina, also known as Malinche, was the subject of a Mexican television miniseries in 2018. A major production in Mexico was the 1998 film, The Other Conquest, which focuses on a Nahua man in the post-conquest era and the evangelization of central Mexico.

The epic journey of Álvar Núñez Cabeza de Vaca has been portrayed in a 1991 feature-length Mexican film, Cabeza de Vaca. The similarly epic and dark journey of Lope de Aguirre was made into a film by Werner Herzog, Aguirre, the Wrath of God (1972), starring Klaus Kinski.

The Mission was a 1996 film idealizing a Jesuit mission to the Guaraní in the territory disputed between Spain and Portugal. The film starred Robert De Niro, Jeremy Irons, and Liam Neeson and It won an Academy Award.

The life of seventeenth-century Mexican nun, Sor Juana Inés de la Cruz, renowned in her lifetime, has been portrayed in a 1990 Argentine film, I, the Worst of All and in the television miniseries Juana Inés. Seventeenth-century Mexican trickster Martín Garatuza was the subject of a late nineteenth-century novel by Mexican politician and writer, Vicente Riva Palacio. In the twentieth century, Garatuza's life was the subject of a 1935 film and a 1986 telenovela, Martín Garatuza.

For the independence era, the 2016 Bolivian-made film made about Mestiza independence leader Juana Azurduy de Padilla, Juana Azurduy, Guerrillera de la Patria Grande, is part of the recent recognition of her role in the independence of Argentina and Bolivia.

== Dominions ==
Spanish and Portuguese empires. Settlement in the Americas, c. 1600. Although the crowns asserted sovereignty over great expanses of territory, this modern map shows the sparseness of actual European settlement in dark blue.

=== North America ===
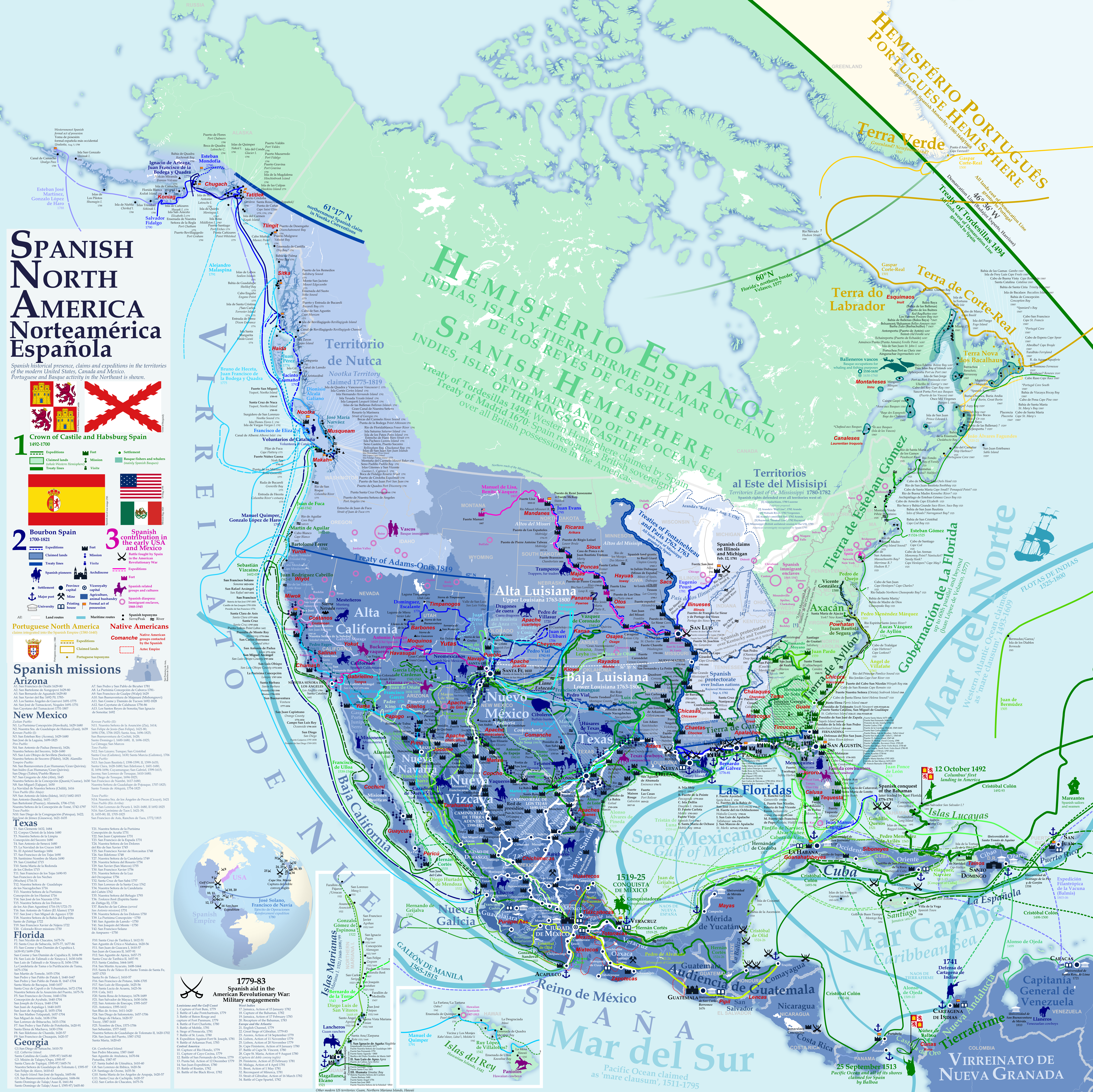
Spanish historical presence, claimed territories, points of interest and expeditions in North America

New Spain in 1794, at the peak of its territorial extent.

- New Spain (1535–1821)
  - Las Californias
  - Alta California
  - Baja California
  - Central America
    - Chiapas
    - Costa Rica
    - Guatemala
    - Honduras
    - San Salvador
  - Cuba (1511–1898)
    - East Cuba
    - West Cuba
    - Florida (1513–1763)
    - Louisiana (1513–1763)
  - México and Michoachán
    - Guanajuato
    - México
    - Michoacán
    - Oaxaca
    - Puebla
    - San Luis Potosí
      - Coahuila
      - Durango
      - New León
      - Texas
    - Veracruz
  - New Galicia
    - Jalisco
    - Zacatecas
  - New México
  - New Santander
  - Nootka Territory (1789–1794)
  - Puerto Rico (1492–1898)
  - Santo Domingo (1492–1795, 1809–1821, 1861–1865)
    - Cibao
    - Ozama
    - Santiago (1509–1655)
  - Sonora and Sinaloa
  - Yucatán

=== South America ===
- Peru
  - Arequipa
  - Chile
  - Chiloé (Note: Subordinate to the Captaincy-General of Chile until 1767.)
  - Cuzco
  - Guayaquil
  - Huamanga
  - Huancavelica
  - Lima
  - Maynas
  - Paposo
  - Puno (Note: Part of the Viceroyalty of Río de la Plata until 1796.)
  - Trujillo
- New Granada
  - Quito
  - Venezuela
- Río de la Plata
  - Buenos Aires
  - Chiquitos
  - Chuquisaca
  - Cochabamba
  - Córdoba del Tucumán
  - La Paz
  - Misiones
  - Moxos
  - Paraguay
  - Potosí
  - Salta del Tucumán

== See also ==
- Atlantic World
- Cartography of Latin America
- Castas
- Spanish Empire
- Spanish American Enlightenment
- Black legend (Spain)
- Hapsburg Spain
- List of largest empires
- Population history of indigenous peoples of the Americas
- Timeline of imperialism § Colonization of North America
- Valladolid debate
- Viceroyalty of New Spain
- Viceroyalty of Peru
