= Partido (region) =

Administrative subdivision in various countries

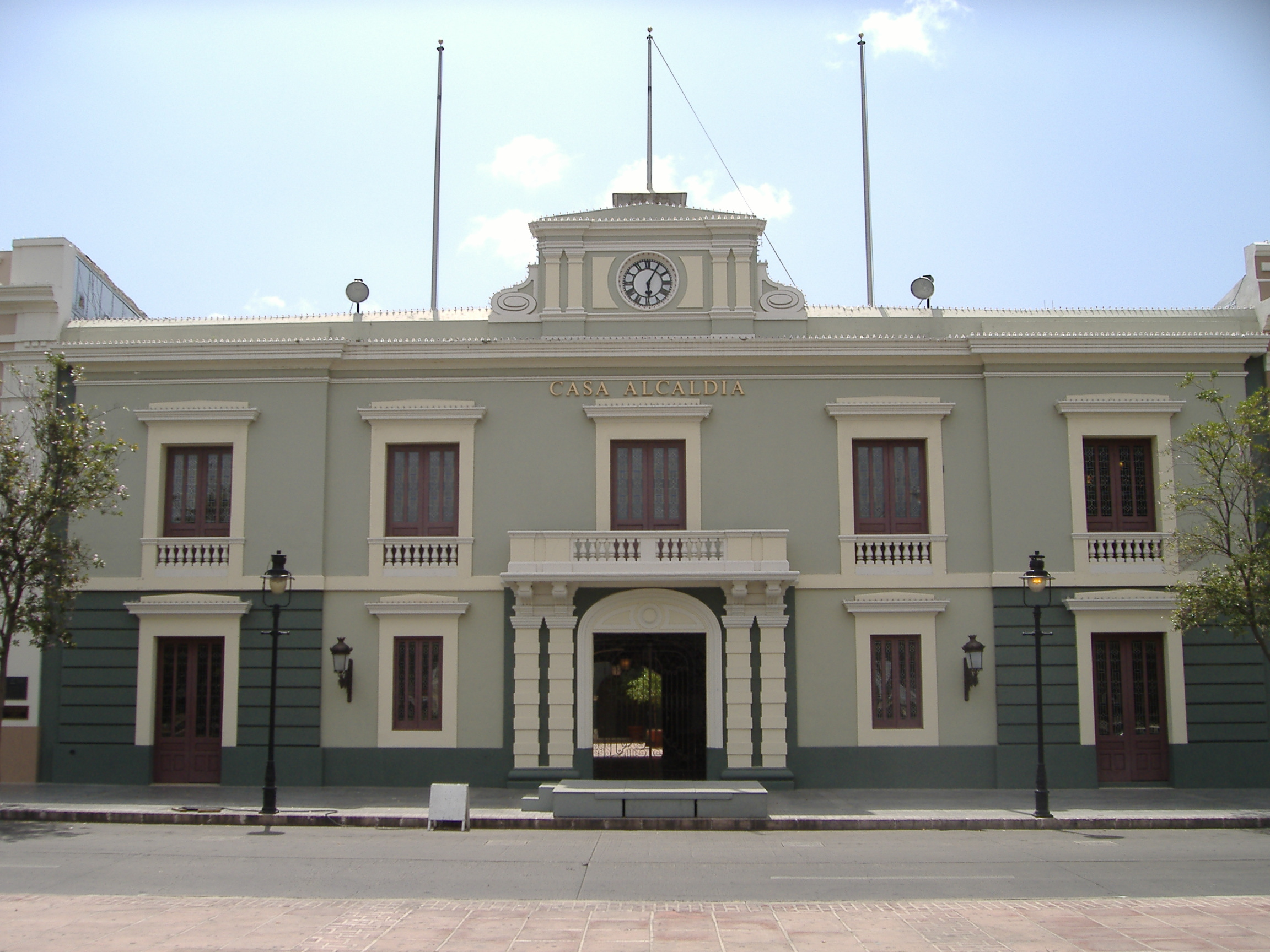
In Ponce, Puerto Rico, creation of the cabildo in 1692, marked the end of the "partido" status and the beginning of the municipality. Today's (2019) Ponce City Hall, above, was built later, in 1846.

Partido (Spanish pronunciation: [paɾˈtiðo]; lit. 'party') was a Spanish colonial term that referred to a governed local administrative region, roughly equivalent to today's municipality in terms of rural land areas included, and used in the Spanish kingdoms in the Americas during the times of the Spanish Empire. It was "the territory or district composed of a jurisdiction or administration from a main city."

The term referred to 18th and 19th-century land regions that consisted of mature dispersed settlements but which had not yet been formally incorporated as hamlets. Though similar to today's municipality, partidos were under the control of a town or city government whose seat was, at times, a day's walk, or longer, away.

== Argentina ==
In Argentina, the partidos are the second-level administrative subdivision in the Province of Buenos Aires.

== Puerto Rico ==
"Partido" was the term used in Spanish colonial times for various scarcely populated regions in Puerto Rico, including Aguada, Ponce, Arecibo, and Coamo.

In the case of Ponce, the region was a partido in 1670, when a chapel was built and nearby neighbors started to build around it, converting the dispersed settlement into a hamlet. However, it continued to depend on the cabildo at the Villa de San Germán for all of its judicial and administrative matters. Later, once the hamlet had grown it, was allowed to build its own Cabildo and run its own affairs independent from San German. The forming of its own cabildo represented the founding of a municipal corporation, at which point it was no longer referred to as partido and became a municipality henceforth.

== See also ==
- Teniente a guerra
- Alcalde
- Alcalde ordinario
- Cabildo
- Regidor
- Corregidor
- Ayuntamiento
- Corregimiento
- Santa Hermandad
- Alcalde de la Santa Hermandad
