= Alcalde mayor =

Spanish municipal magistrate

An alcalde mayor was a regional magistrate in the Spanish Viceroyalties in the Americas during the times of the Spanish Empire in the 16th through 19th centuries Spanish West Indies Empire. These regional officials had judicial, administrative, military and legislative authority. Their judicial and administrative functions superseded those of an alcalde. Their area of territorial jurisdiction was called an alcaldía mayor. Judicial appeals from the decisions of an alcalde mayor were heard by an audiencia.

In New Spain (Mexico), alcaldes mayores were chief administrators in colonial-era administrative territories termed alcaldías mayores; in colonial-era Peru the units were called corregimientos.

== See also ==
- Alcalde ordinario
- Presidente municipal
- Mayor
- Sargento mayor
- Corregidor
- Cabildo
- Regidor
- Síndico
- Ayuntamiento
- Teniente a guerra
- Corregimiento
- Alcalde de la Santa Hermandad

== Further ereading ==
- Corominas, Joan and José A Pascual. Diccionario crítico etimológico castellano e hispánico, 7 vols. Madrid, Editorial Gredos, 1981. ISBN 84-249-1362-0
- Haring, C. H., The Spanish Empire in America. New York, Oxford University Press, 1947.
- O'Callaghan, Joseph F. A History of Medieval Spain. Ithaca, Cornell University Press, 1975. ISBN 0-8014-0880-6
