= Alcalde de la Santa Hermandad =

Alcalde de la Santa Hermandad (lit. 'Mayor of the Holy Brotherhood') was a term used in the Spanish colonies in the Americas during the times of the Spanish Empire. The term referred to judicial magistrates named in towns and villages within the jurisdiction of the Spanish Empire in the Americas whose function was primarily to be informed of infractions committed in rural areas against the established order, so they could be prosecuted. In this capacity, their primary function was to help the militia of a rural region within the jurisdiction of a cabildo. This militia was organized under an institution termed Santa Hermandad. The term of service of an Alcalde de la Santa Hermandad was one year. The position was eliminated around 1835, when the Santa Hermandad force itself was disestablished.

== Origins ==
The hermandades initially began to form in Andalusia in 1265, in towns seeking to “defend their interests” from Islamic rebels who had been taking land and proclaiming their leader king. They existed in Puerto Rico during most of the 18th century. The position of Alcalde de la Santa Hermandad was established in Ponce in the 1680s.

== Nature of duties ==
Alcaldes de la Santa Hermandad were law enforcement / justice occupations. Their range of duties included addressing infractions related to theft, larceny, kidnapping, assault, armed robbery, restraining the free movement of others, premeditated arson of homes, barns, farms, hives or corrals, and murder or injuries resulting from robbery, deceit or stalking. They could persecute, apprehend, arrest and jail offenders whose crimes were committed within the jurisdictions of small villages and rural or forested areas as long as the number of residents of these jurisdictions was less than 30. However, they could also exercise these powers if the offense was committed in a city or town and the offender had fled into these such less populated areas. They could also impose and collect fines from the offenders, and had to keep a strict ledger of the fines collected, their dates, amounts and the nature of the offense. This ledger had to be submitted to the cabildo on a regular basis and be certified by the cabildo's accountant. They could also perform other duties outside their base scope of duties as long as they had written orders from the governor, the alcalde ordinario or the cabildo of the jurisdiction in question.

== See also ==
- Alcalde
- Alcalde ordinario
- Cabildo
- Presidente municipal
- Corregidor
- Sargento mayor
- Regidor
- Síndico
- Ayuntamiento
- Teniente a guerra
- Corregimiento
- Santa Hermandad
