= Justicia mayor =

Title in the century Spanish Empire

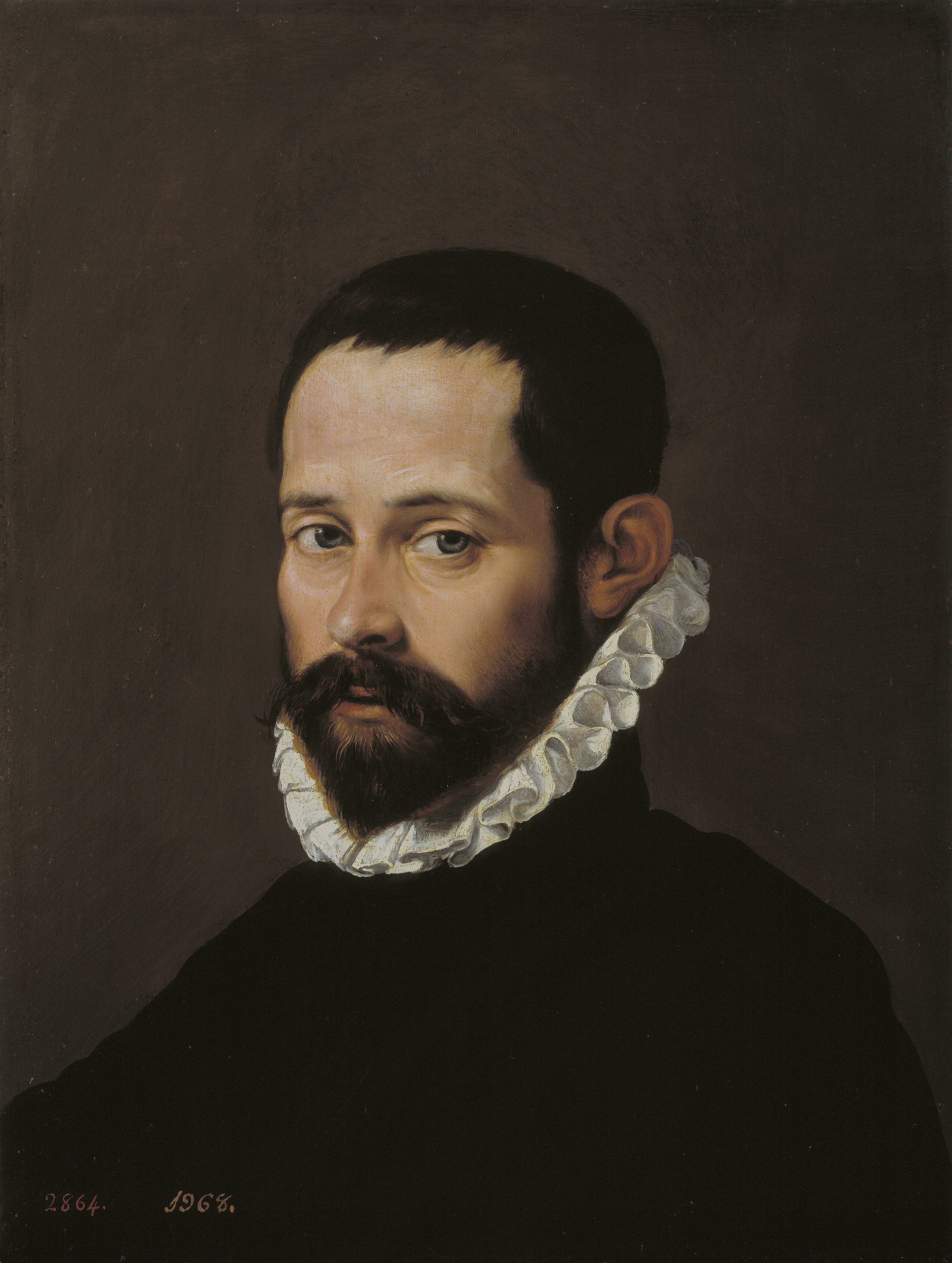
Diego Hurtado de Mendoza, head butler of the King and Justicia mayor of the King's house

Justicia mayor was a title in the nineteenth century Spanish Empire. A Justicia mayor could perform law enforcement and judicial functions within a town, city of region. It was similar to the position of sheriff in some jurisdictions.

== History ==
The 13th century Castilian-Leon Court started to use the term alguacil to designate the Alférez del rey deputy for judicial matters. However, in the 14th century the term Justicia mayor was used to refer to the same officer. The term referred to the executioner of Kings and/or Judges. The Justicia mayor was assisted by other "alguaciles menores" (deputies). The Justicia mayor was the highest authority in his jurisdiction.

== Functions ==
The functions of the Justicia mayor in the King's household were as follows:

=== Judicial ===
- Ensure that tribunals possessed the necessary elements to facilitate judicial proceedings.
- Apprehend and detain those who were to be judged.
- Follow through on the punishments ordered by the King or his Judges.
- Carry out sentences, whether civil or criminal.

=== Law enforcement ===
- Prevent crime.
- Impose punishment.
- Protect Tribunal facilities.
- Remove folks loitering around the tribunals.
- Arrest criminals.
- Control business practices to prevent fraud.
- Defend the rule of law
- Prevent civil unrest.
- Maintain order during judicial proceedings.

== Puerto Rico ==
Justicias mayores were named in Puerto Rico in the mid-1810s. These position/titles appeared after the Spanish constitutional system was abolished. The Justicias mayores performed the functions later performed by a mayor, but many other functions as well. These district authorities had powers that included police, tax collection, justice, and war. They were to preside over the ayuntamiento, carry out orders from the Provincial Government, and exercise judgment where the laws allowed it. In Puerto Rico, the teniente justicia mayor for the Ponce District (which included Ponce, Coamo, and much of the southern region) was Alejandro Ordóñez. The Justicia mayor positions, however, did not last long because, upon the issuance of the Cédula Real (Royal Decree) of 6 June 1816, they were terminated and regular alcaldes were named instead. The naming of alcaldes lasted until 1820 when towns went back to electing their own alcalde.

== See also ==
- Alcalde
- Corregidor
- Teniente a guerra
- Sargento mayor

== Sources ==
- Jaime de Salazar y Acha. La casa del Rey de Castilla y León en la Edad Media. Centro de Estudios Políticos y Constitucionales. Madrid: Rumagraf S.A. Colección Historia de la Sociedad Política. First edition. 2000. ISBN 9788425911286.
