= Cabildo (council) =

Spanish colonial municipal governments

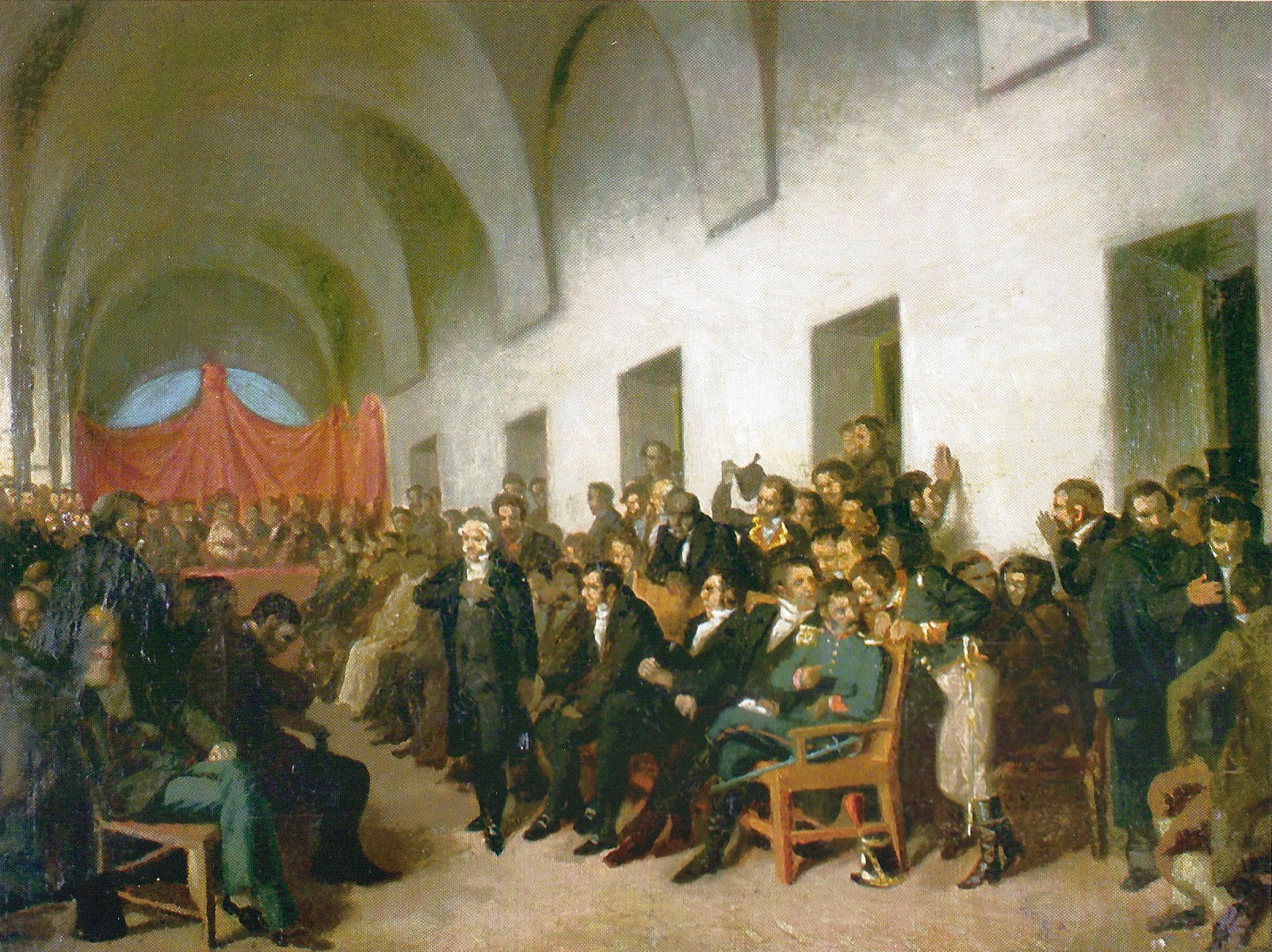
1810 meeting of the cabildo in Buenos Aires

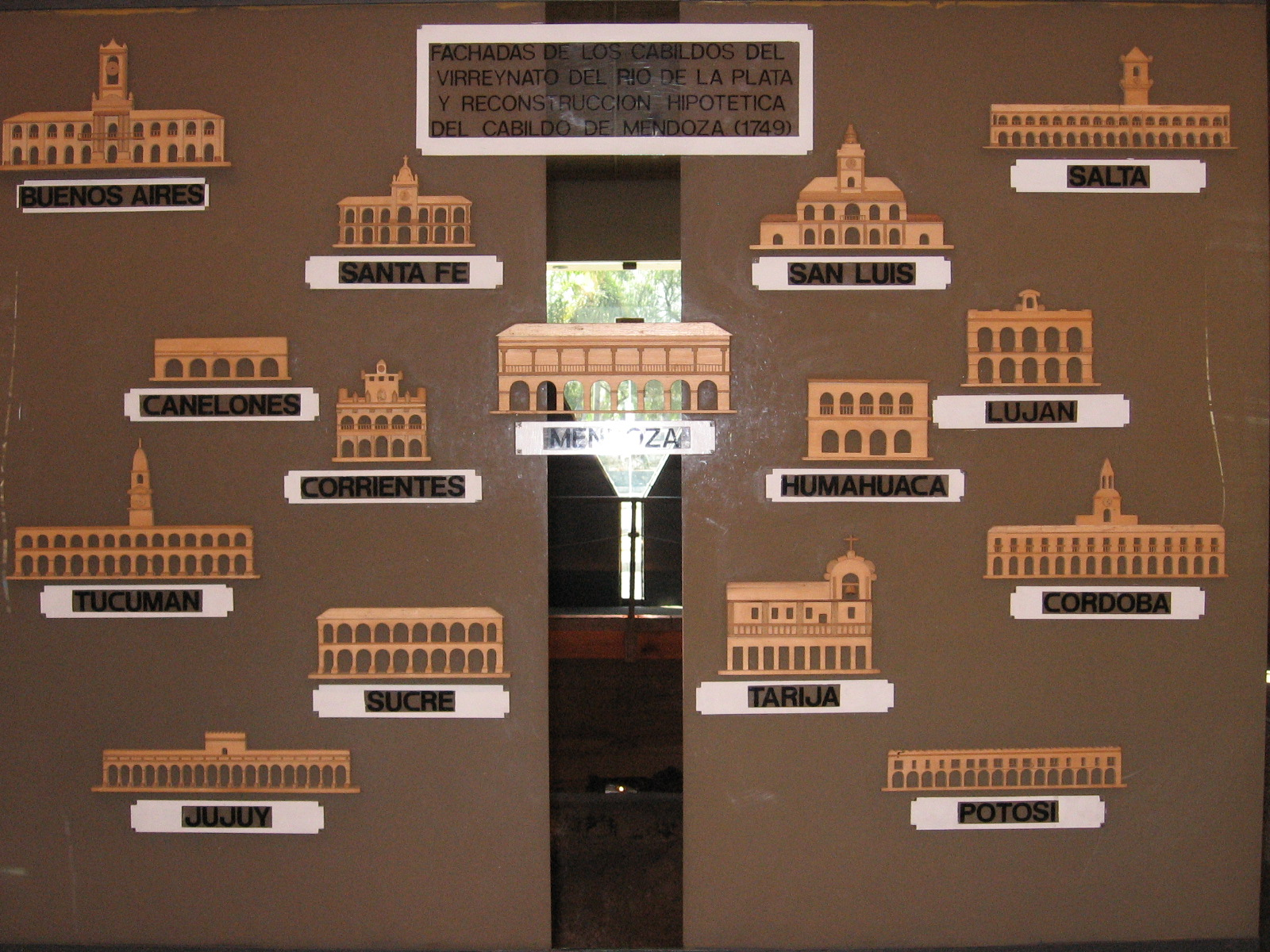
Depiction of the main cabildo buildings of the Viceroyalty of the Río de la Plata.

A cabildo (Spanish pronunciation: [kaˈβildo]) or ayuntamiento (Spanish: [aʝuntaˈmjento]) was a Spanish colonial and early postcolonial administrative council that governed a municipality. Cabildos were sometimes appointed, sometimes elected, but were considered to be representative of all land-owning heads of household (vecinos). The colonial cabildo was essentially the same as the one that was developed in medieval Castile.

The word cabildo has the same Latin root (capitulum) as the English word chapter and in fact is also the Spanish word for a cathedral chapter. Historically, the term ayuntamiento was often preceded by the word excelentísimo (English: "most excellent") as a style of office in referring to the council. That phrase is often abbreviated Exc.^{mo} Ay.^{to}

== History ==
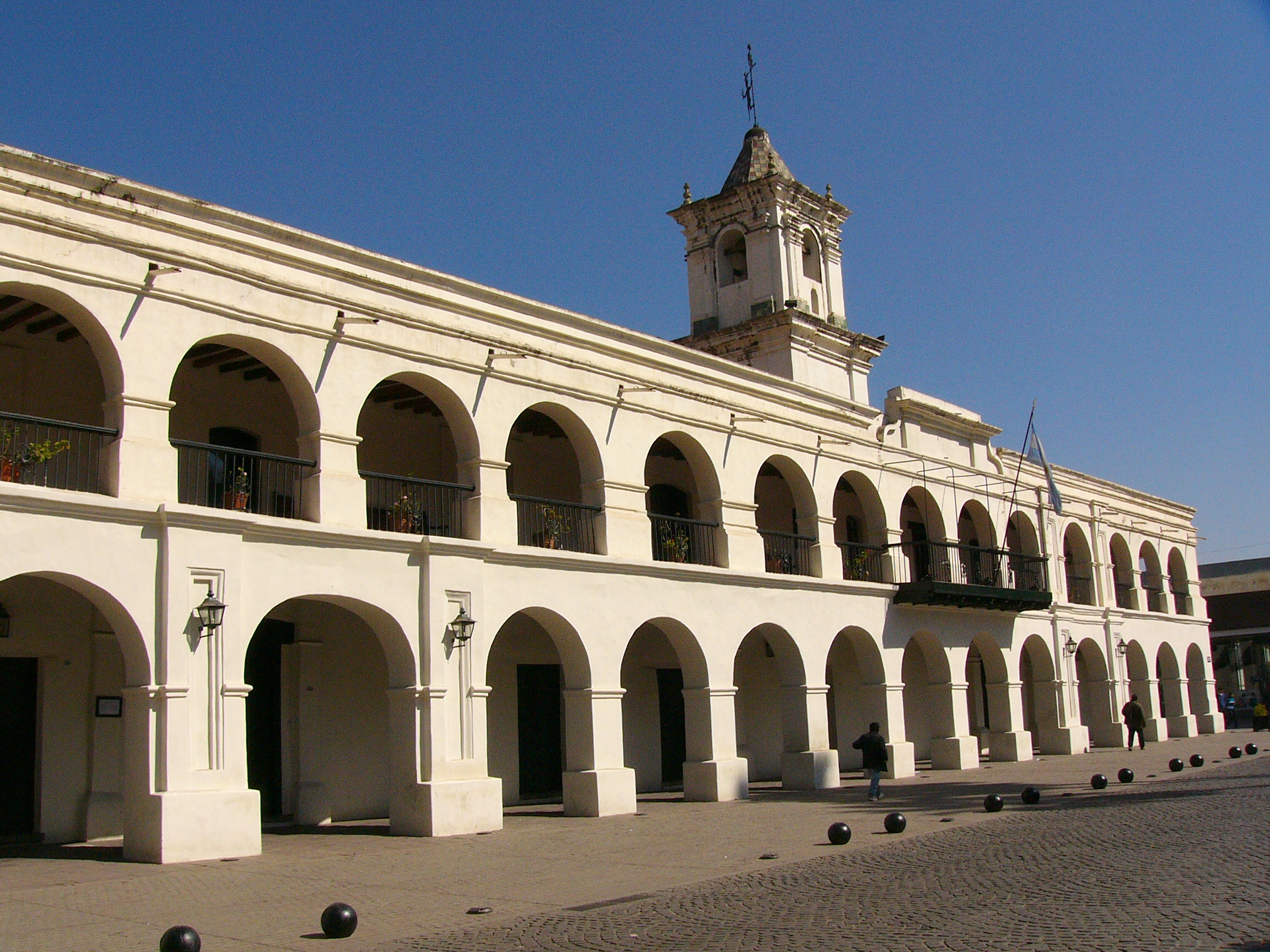
Cabildo of Salta, Argentina.

The Castilian cabildo has some similarities to the ancient Roman municipium and civitas, especially in the use of plural administrative officers and its control of the surrounding countryside, the territorium, but its evolution is a uniquely-medieval development. With the collapse of the Western Roman Empire and the establishment of the Visigothic Kingdom, the ancient municipal government vanished. In many areas, seeking to escape from the political instability around them, people entrusted themselves to large landholders and to exchanging their service for the landholder's protection in a process that ultimately led to feudalism. (See also Manorialism.) In areas in which the old territoria survived, the Visigothic kings appointed a single officer, called either a comes or a iudice, to replace the defunct municipia or civitates. After the Muslim conquest, the new rulers also appointed various judicial officers to manage the affairs of the cities. Qadis heard any cases that fell under the purview of Sharia law, and sahibs oversaw the administration of the various other areas of urban life, such as the markets and the public order.

The cabildo proper began its slow evolution in the process of the Reconquista. As fortified areas grew into urban centres, or older cities were incorporated into the expanding Christian kingdoms of Portugal, León and Castile, kings and sometimes local lords granted the cities various levels of self-rule and unique sets of laws (the fueros) and made them the administrative centre of a large terminus or alfoz, which was analogous to the ancient territorium. In general, municipal governments often consisted of a council (consejo) that was open to all the property-owning adult males of the city and a nobleman appointed to represent the king and organize the defense of the city and terminus. By the 13th century, these open councils proved unwieldy and were replaced by a smaller body, the cabildo or ayuntamiento consisting of set number of regidores (usually 24 in the largest cities) elected by the property owners in the city. The new bodies took their permanent form by the end of the 14th century. As part of the same process, a municipal council (the consell) with different attributes and composition also evolved in the neighboring Kingdom of Aragon during this period.

== Structure ==
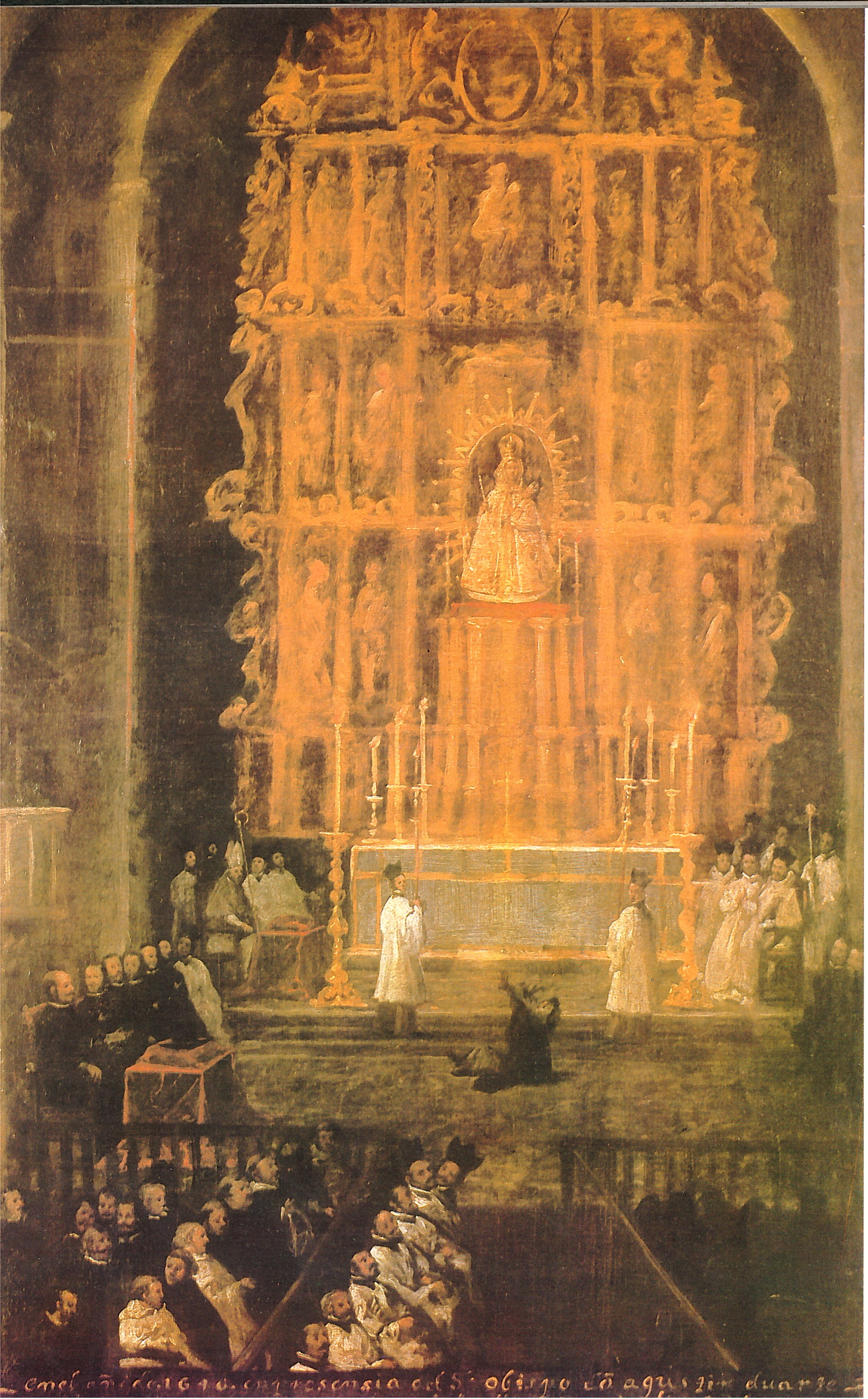
Vargas, José María; Cevallos García, Gabriel and others investigators. (1646)

In theory, every municipality in the Spanish colonies in the Americas and the Spanish Philippines had a cabildo. Municipalities included not only the cities but also the surrounding lands. All lands were ultimately assigned to a municipality. Usually, the cabildo made local laws and reported to the presidente (president) of the audiencia, who in turn reported to the viceroy. The cabildo had judicial, legislative, and administrative duties. For that reason, it was often addressed with the formula, Consejo, Justicia y Regimiento (Council, Justice and Government).

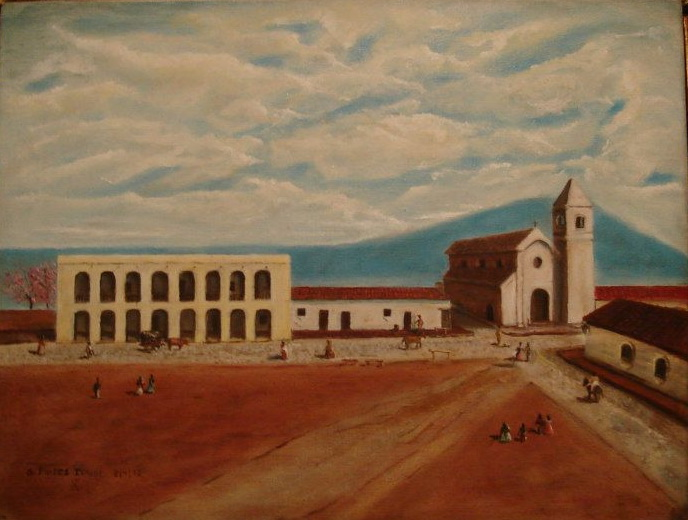
Gerardo Flores Ivaldi Oil

The cabildo consisted of several types of officials. There were four to twelve regidores, depending on the size and importance of the municipality. Regidores were not just deliberative officers, but all shared in the administration of the territory by dividing tasks among themselves. Initially the regidores were elected by all the heads of household. In the late Middle Ages, those elections often turned violent, with citizens forming bands to control elections and even resorting to murder. To minimize that problem, kings began to appoint a certain number of or even all of the regidores in certain cities. By the modern era, different cabildos had different mixes of elected and appointed regidores both in Europe and overseas. Finally, to add another layer of control, the kings introduced corregidores to represent them directly and preside over the cabildos. Although many municipalities lost their right to elect all or some of their regidores as time went on, cities and cabildos gained new power with the development of the Castilian and Leonese Parliaments (the cortes) because cities had a right to representation in them.

In addition to the council members, the cabildo had one or two magistrates, the alcades, whom the regidores elected every January 1. Alcaldes served as judges of first instance in all criminal and civil cases and acted as presiding officers of the cabildo unless there was a corregidor. In provincial capitals, the first alcalde would fill in for incapacitated governors. Other officers were the alférez real (royal standard-bearer), who had a vote in cabildo deliberations and would substitute the alcalde if the latter could not carry out the functions of his office; the alguacil mayor, who oversaw local law enforcement; the fiel ejecutor, who was the inspector of weights, measures and markets, in charge of the supplies of the city and oversaw municipal sanitation; the procurador or city attorney; and a scribe.

After the Bourbon Reforms, peninsulares were almost exclusively appointed to the positions of viceroy and bishop. Other offices, such as oidores of the audiencia, corregidores (in the places in which they continued to exist after the Bourbon Reforms) and intendant, also saw a rise in the proportion of peninsulares being appointed. The last ones had been positions to which creoles once had easy access, especially after the approval of the sale of offices, which began during the financial crisis in the late 16th century. As a result of being shut out of those offices, creoles turned to the cabildos for political power. Soon enough, cabildos became the centre of power for creoles, as evidenced in many of the clashes, usually with the peninsular-dominated audiencias, in the period leading up to the Spanish American Wars of Independence. In the first decades of the national period, the traditional form of the cabildo was kept in several Spanish American nations although they were eventually replaced by legislative municipal councils.

== List of Spanish American settlements ruled by a cabildo during colonial times ==
=== Viceroyalty of New Spain ===
For most of the colonial period, the Viceroyalty of New Spain was divided into five real audiencias or kingdoms: Santo Domingo, Mexico, Guatemala, New Galicia and Manila. The following list shows the settlements (cities and villas) in the real audiencias that made up New Spain which had a cabildo and were ruled following this municipal form of local government during the Spanish colonial period.

==== Real Audiencia of Santo Domingo ====
City or villa	Colonial province	Modern country	Modern population
Bayamo	Santiago de Cuba	Cuba	236,826
Santiago de Cuba	Santiago de Cuba	Cuba	507,167
Holguín	Santiago de Cuba	Cuba	355,189
Havana	Havana	Cuba	2,137,847
Matanzas	Havana	Cuba	163,631
New Orleans	Louisiana	United States	383,997
Puerto Príncipe	Havana	Cuba	333,251
Puerto Rico	Puerto Rico	Puerto Rico	185,187
San Juan de Puerto Rico	Puerto Rico	Puerto Rico	342,259
Sanctispiritus	Havana	Cuba	142,618
Santiago de los Caballeros	Santo Domingo	Dominican Republic	771,748
Santo Domingo	Santo Domingo	Dominican Republic	1,029,110
Sevilla la Nueva	Jamaica	Jamaica	0
Trinidad	Havana	Cuba	76,500
Villaclara	Havana	Cuba	191,000

==== Real Audiencia of Mexico ====
City or villa	Colonial province	Modern country	Modern population
Antequera	Oaxaca	Mexico	258,913
Campeche	Yucatán	Mexico	249,623
Celaya	Guanajuato	Mexico	340,387
Cholula	Puebla	Mexico	292,881
Guanajuato	Guanajuato	Mexico	194,500
Irapuato	Guanajuato	Mexico	452,090
León	Guanajuato	Mexico	1,579,803
Lerma	Mexico	Mexico	170,327
Medellín	Veracruz	Mexico	95,202
Mérida	Yucatán	Mexico	921,771
México	Mexico	Mexico	9,209,944
Pachuca	Mexico	Mexico	297,848
Pátzcuaro	Michoacán	Mexico	98,382
Puebla	Puebla	Mexico	1,542,232
Querétaro	Mexico	Mexico	794,789
Salamanca	Yucatán	Mexico	4,644
Salvatierra	Guanajuato	Mexico	35,401
San Luis Potosí	San Luis Potosí	Mexico	824,229
San Miguel el Grande	Guanajuato	Mexico	3,086
Segura de la Frontera	Puebla	Mexico	0
Silao	Guanajuato	Mexico	83,352
Tepeaca	Puebla	Mexico	84,270
Texcoco	Mexico	Mexico	35,491
Tlaxcala	Tlaxcala	Mexico	13,555
Toluca	Mexico	Mexico	223,876
Tzintzuntzan	Michoacán	Mexico	12,259
Valladolid	Michoacán	Mexico	797,773
Valladolid	Yucatán	Mexico	56,494
Veracruz	Veracruz	Mexico	537,952
Villa de Salamanca	Yucatán	Mexico	12,572
Villahermosa	Tabasco	Mexico	340,060
Xochimilco	Mexico	Mexico	442,178

==== Real Audiencia of Guatemala ====
City or villa	Colonial province	Modern country	Modern population
Cartago	Costa Rica	Costa Rica	156,600
Choluteca	Comayagua	Honduras	175,056
Ciudad Real de Chiapas	Chiapas	Mexico	183,509
Cobán	Guatemala	Guatemala	237,572
Comayagua	Comayagua	Honduras	184,694
Granada	Nicaragua	Nicaragua	134,104
Guatemala	Guatemala	Guatemala	60,608
León	Nicaragua	Nicaragua	213,718
Nicaragua	Nicaragua	Nicaragua	35,745
New Segovia	Nicaragua	Nicaragua	4,868
San Miguel	San Salvador	El Salvador	290,612
San Salvador	San Salvador	El Salvador	525,990
Tegucigalpa	Comayagua	Honduras	1,199,136
Trujillo	Guatemala	Honduras	71,106

==== Real Audiencia of New Galicia ====
City or villa	Colonial province	Modern country	Modern population
Bexar	Texas	United States	1,434,625
Cadereyta	New León	Mexico	75,721
Chihuahua	Durango	Mexico	925,762
Colima	Guadalajara	Mexico	146,965
Durango	Durango	Mexico	616,068
Guadalajara	Guadalajara	Mexico	1,385,629
León	New León	Mexico	7,169
Monterrey	New León	Mexico	1,142,952
Parral	Durango	Mexico	109,510
Saltillo	Coahuila	Mexico	879,958
Santa Fe de Nuevo México	New Mexico	United States	87,505
Parral	Durango	Mexico	44,472

==== Real Audiencia of Manila ====
City or villa	Colonial province	Modern country	Modern population
Manila	Philippines	Philippines	1,902,590

=== Viceroyalty of New Granada ===
Since the creation of the Viceroyalty of New Granada, its territory was divided into three real audiencias or kingdoms: New Granada, Quito and Venezuela. The following list shows the settlements (cities and villas) in the real audiencias that made up New Granada which had a cabildo and were ruled following this municipal form of local government during the Spanish colonial period.

==== Real Audiencia of Santa Fe in New Granada ====
City or villa	Colonial province	Modern country	Modern population
Altagracia	Santa Fe	Colombia	0
Anserma	Popayán	Colombia	20,876
Antioquia	Antioquia	Colombia	23,216
Arma	Antioquia	Colombia	5,000
Cambis	Neiva	Colombia	0
Cartagena de Indias	Cartagena	Colombia	914,552
Cartago	Popayán	Colombia	142,902
Chire	Llanos	Colombia	1,250
Girón	Pamplona	Colombia	152,582
Guaduas	Santa Fe	Colombia	15,862
Honda	Mariquita	Colombia	23,658
Ibagué	Mariquita	Colombia	492,554
La Palma	Mariquita	Colombia	7,708
La Plata	Neiva	Colombia	25,791
La Ronda	Mariquita	Colombia	0
Marinilla	Antioquia	Colombia	48,258
Mariquita	Mariquita	Colombia	27,907
Medellín	Antioquia	Colombia	2,490,164
Medina	Llanos	Colombia	7,281
Mompox	Cartagena	Colombia	23,649
Muzo	Tunja	Colombia	5,350
Nata	Tierra Firme	Panama	6,003
Neiva	Neiva	Colombia	365,542
Nombre de Dios	Tierra Firme	Panama	1,130
New Córdoba	Santa Marta	Colombia	0
New Salamanca de la Ramada	Santa Marta	Colombia	0
New Seville	Santa Marta	Colombia	0
Ocaña	Santa Marta	Colombia	116,232
Pamplona	Pamplona	Colombia	46,013
Panama	Tierra Firme	Panama	1,086,990
Penonomé	Tierra Firme	Panama	21,748
Pore	Llanos	Colombia	7,420
Portobelo	Tierra Firme	Panama	4,559
Purificación	Neiva	Colombia	29,539
Remedios	Antioquia	Colombia	29,199
Rionegro	Antioquia	Colombia	90,256
Riohacha	Riohacha	Colombia	126,103
Rosario	Pamplona	Colombia	107,991
Salazar	Pamplona	Colombia	4,611
San Agustín de Cáceres	Tunja	Colombia	0
San Gil	Socorro	Colombia	51,874
San José de Cúcuta	Pamplona	Colombia	748,948
San Juan de los Llanos	Llanos	Colombia	5,006
San Martin de los Llanos	Llanos	Colombia	21,831
Santa Fe de Bogotá	Santa Fe	Colombia	7,968,095
Santa Marta	Santa Marta	Colombia	566,150
Santiago de las Atalayas	Llanos	Colombia	0
Simití	Cartagena	Colombia	15,353
Socorro	Socorro	Colombia	26,232
Tamalameque	Santa Marta	Colombia	5,585
Tenerife	Santa Marta	Colombia	6,932
Timaná	Neiva	Colombia	7,321
Tocaima	Mariquita	Colombia	13,176
Tolú	Cartagena	Colombia	26,401
Toro	Popayán	Colombia	9,303
Tunja	Tunja	Colombia	163,894
Valledupar	Santa Marta	Colombia	431,794
Vélez	Socorro	Colombia	10,231
Veraguas	Tierra Firme	Panama	88,997
Villa de Leyva	Tunja	Colombia	9,926
Zaragoza	Antioquia	Colombia	13,434

==== Real Audiencia of Quito ====
City or villa	Colonial province	Modern country	Modern population
Almaguer	Popayán	Colombia	1,032
Baeza	Quijos	Ecuador	1,972
Barbacoas	Popayán	Colombia	16,588
Buga	Popayán	Colombia	109,753
Caguan	Popayán	Colombia	26,787
Cali	Popayán	Colombia	2,916,790
Caloto	Popayán	Colombia	5,091
Cuenca	Quito	Ecuador	361,524
Écija de Sucumbios	Popayán	Colombia	0
Guayaquil	Guayaquil	Ecuador	2,912,296
Ibarra	Quito	Ecuador	157,941
Iscuandé	Popayán	Colombia	3,839
Jaén	Jaén	Peru	93,631
Loja	Quito	Ecuador	203,496
Mocoa	Popayán	Colombia	46,171
Pasto	Popayán	Colombia	323,853
Popayán	Popayán	Colombia	282,734
Puerto Viejo	Guayaquil	Ecuador	322,925
Quilichao	Popayán	Colombia	54,364
Quito	Quito	Ecuador	1,763,275
Riobamba	Quito	Ecuador	177,213
San Juan de Huila	Popayán	Colombia	31,802
San Vicente de Páez	Popayán	Colombia	2,067
Zaruma	Quito	Ecuador	10,005

==== Real Audiencia of Caracas in Venezuela ====
City or villa	Colonial province	Modern country	Modern population
Altamira de Cáceres	Maracaibo	Colombia	59,613
Barcelona	Cumaná	Venezuela	454,200
Barinas	Maracaibo	Venezuela	505,182
Barquisimeto	Caracas	Venezuela	1,270,692
Caracas	Caracas	Venezuela	3,242,000
Carora	Caracas	Venezuela	209,217
Coro	Caracas	Venezuela	195,227
Cumaná	Cumaná	Venezuela	405,626
El Tocuyo	Caracas	Venezuela	41,327
Gibraltar	Maracaibo	Venezuela	4,000
Guanare	Caracas	Venezuela	112,286
La Grita	Maracaibo	Venezuela	88,450
Maracaibo	Maracaibo	Venezuela	1,752,602
Mérida	Maracaibo	Venezuela	289,800
Nirgua	Caracas	Venezuela	35,407
New Cádiz	Margarita	Venezuela	0
New Écija	Cumaná	Venezuela	0
Port of Spain	Trinidad	Trinidad and Tobago	49,867
San Carlos	Caracas	Venezuela	83,957
San Cristóbal	Maracaibo	Venezuela	282,830
San Felipe	Caracas	Venezuela	174,300
San Sebastián	Caracas	Venezuela	33,336
Trujillo	Caracas	Venezuela	110,920
Valencia	Caracas	Venezuela	1,619,470

=== Viceroyalty of Peru ===
After the creation of the Viceroyalties of New Granada and Río de la Plata, the Viceroyalty of Peru was divided into two real audiencias or kingdoms: Peru and Chile. The following list shows the settlements (cities and villas) in the real audiencias that made up Colonial Peru which had a cabildo and were ruled following this municipal form of local government during the Spanish colonial period.

==== Real Audiencia of Lima in Peru ====
City or villa	Colonial province	Modern country	Modern population
Arequipa	Arequipa	Peru	1,195,700
Arica	Arequipa	Peru	241,653
Castrovirreyna	Huancavelica	Peru	1,523
Chachapoyas	Trujillo	Peru	32,026
Cusco	Cuzco	Peru	428,450
Huamanga	Huamanga	Peru	180,766
Huánuco	Tarma	Peru	196,627
Ica	Lima	Peru	282,407
Jerez de la Frontera	Jaén	Peru	15,130
Lima	Lima	Peru	10,092,000
Moquegua	Arequipa	Peru	69,882
Moyobamba	Trujillo	Peru	50,073
New Jerez	Jaén	Peru	0
Paita	Trujillo	Peru	179,346
Piura	Trujillo	Peru	630,244
Puno	Puno	Peru	135,288
Santa Marta de Indios	Arequipa	Peru	0
Saña	Trujillo	Peru	4,550
Tangarara	Trujillo	Peru	0
Trujillo	Trujillo	Peru	1,067,700

==== Real Audiencia of Santiago de Chile ====
City or villa	Colonial province	Modern country	Modern population
Castro	Chiloé	Chile	29,148
Cauquenes	Concepción	Chile	33,114
Concepcion	Concepción	Chile	223,574
Copiapó	Santiago	Chile	168,831
La Imperial	Concepción	Chile	0
La Serena	Santiago	Chile	212,884
Melipilla	Santiago	Chile	108,540
Osorno	Chiloé	Chile	132,245
Petorca	Santiago	Chile	4,535
Quillota	Santiago	Chile	66,025
Santiago de Chile	Santiago	Chile	6,269,384
Talca	Santiago	Chile	232,131

=== Viceroyalty of the Río de la Plata ===
Since the creation of the Viceroyalty of the Río de la Plata, its territory was divided into two real audiencias or kingdoms: Río de la Plata and Charcas. The following list shows the settlements (cities and villas) in the real audiencias that made up Río de la Plata which had a cabildo and were ruled following this municipal form of local government during the Spanish colonial period.

==== Real Audiencia of Buenos Aires in Río de la Plata ====
City or villa	Colonial province	Modern country	Modern population
Asunción	Paraguay	Paraguay	462,241
Buenos Aires	Buenos Aires	Argentina	3,121,707
Canelones	Banda Oriental	Uruguay	24,185
Catamarca	Tucumán	Argentina	159,139
Ciudad Real de Guayrá	Paraguay	Brazil	0
Concepcion de Buena Esperanza	Buenos Aires	Argentina	0
Córdoba del Tucumán	Tucumán	Argentina	1,505,250
Corrientes	Buenos Aires	Argentina	346,334
El Barco	Tucumán	Argentina	0
Jujuy	Tucumán	Argentina	257,970
La Carlota	Tucumán	Argentina	12,537
La Rioja	Tucumán	Argentina	383,865
Londres	Tucumán	Argentina	2,134
Maldonado	Banda Oriental	Uruguay	102,000
Mendoza	Cuyo	Argentina	115,041
Montevideo	Banda Oriental	Uruguay	1,287,452
New Oran	Tucumán	Argentina	76,070
Río Cuarto	Tucumán	Argentina	157,010
Salta	Tucumán	Argentina	627,704
San Juan de Cuyo	Cuyo	Argentina	109,123
San Luis de Cuyo	Cuyo	Argentina	169,947
San Miguel de Tucumán	Tucumán	Argentina	548,866
Santa Fe del Río de la Plata	Buenos Aires	Argentina	423,212
Santiago del Estero	Tucumán	Argentina	311,506
Santiago de Jerez	Paraguay	Brazil	0
Santiago Sanchez	Buenos Aires	Argentina	0

==== Real Audiencia of Charcas ====
City or villa	Colonial province	Modern country	Modern population
Charcas	Charcas	Bolivia	296,125
Cochabamba	Cochabamba	Bolivia	661,484
La Paz	La Paz	Bolivia	757,431
Mizque	Cochabamba	Bolivia	26,659
Oruro	Charcas	Bolivia	297,497
Potosí	Potosí	Bolivia	267,907
Santa Cruz	Cochabamba	Bolivia	1,606,671
Tarija	Potosí	Bolivia	268,000

== Currently existing ==
Because cabildos were the city government, the city administrative offices were often called the "cabildo". Those names are preserved in parts of Latin America and even in New Orleans.

At present, cabildos exist only on the Canary Islands (cabildos insulares), with one governing each island, and they are elected. Cabildos there resemble the consells insulars (island councils) of the Balearic Islands.

== See also ==
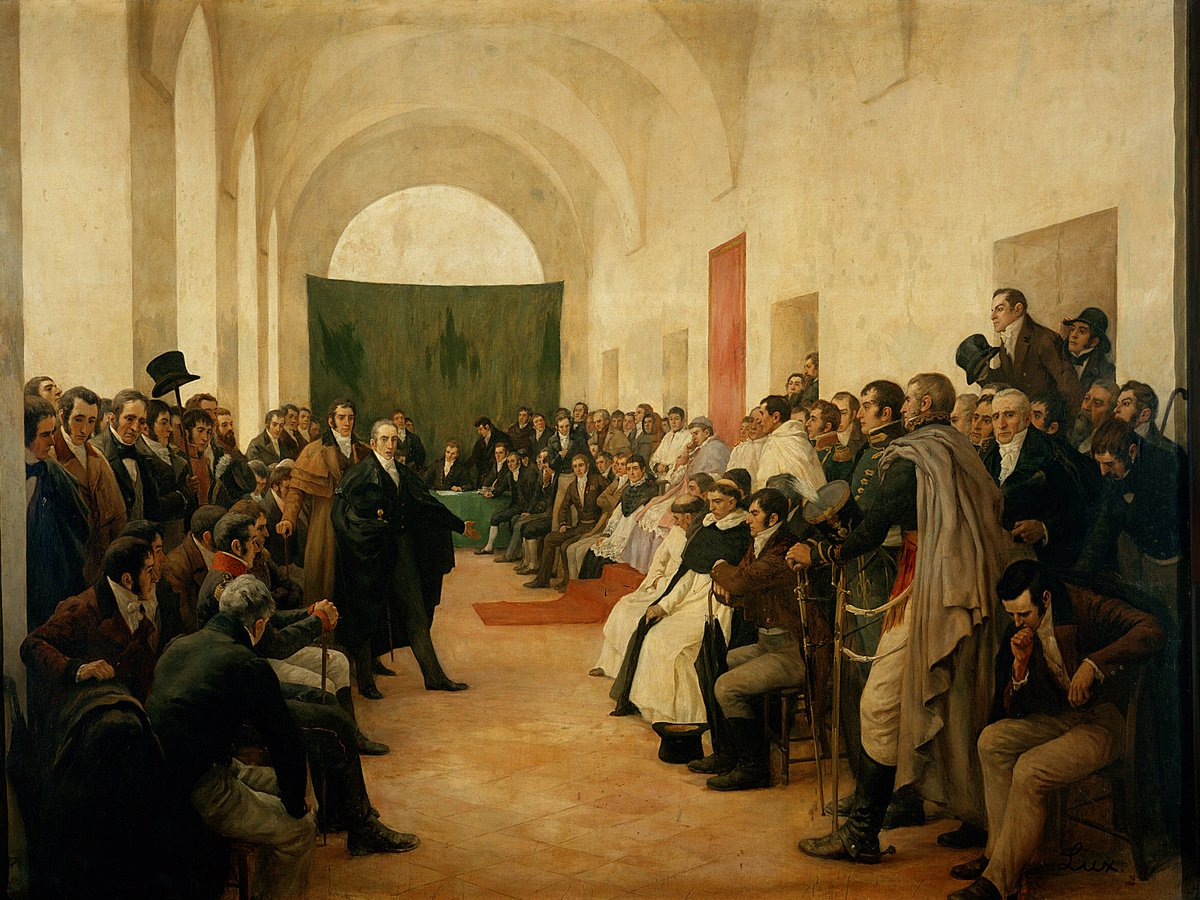
The "Cabildo Abierto" of May 22, 1810, in the city of Buenos Aires (now part of Argentina, then part of the Viceroyalty of the Río de la Plata), where it was decided to remove the viceroy Baltasar Hidalgo de Cisneros.

- Ayuntamiento
- Corregidor
- Municipal council
- The Cabildo
- Crown of Castile
- Open cabildo
- Alcalde
- Alcalde ordinario
- Sargento mayor
- Regidor
- Síndico
- Corregimiento
- Teniente a guerra
- Santa Hermandad

== Sources ==
- Din, Gilbert C. (1996) The New Orleans Cabildo: Colonial Louisiana's First City Government, 1769-1803 Louisiana State University Press, Baton Rouge, ISBN 0-8071-2042-1
- Fisher, John (1969) "The Intendant System and the Cabildos of Peru, 1784-1810" The Hispanic American Historical Review 49(3): pp. 430–453
- "Municipios", Diccionario de Historia de Venezuela. Caracas: Fundación Polar, 1997. ISBN 980-6397-37-1
- O'Callaghan, Joseph F. A History of Medieval Spain. Ithaca, Cornell University Press, 1975. ISBN 0-8014-0880-6
- Pike, Fredrick B. (1960) "The Cabildo and Colonial Loyalty to Hapsburg Rulers" Journal of Inter-American Studies 2(4): pp. 405–420
- Pike, Fredrick B. (1958) "The Municipality and the System of Checks and Balances in Spanish American Colonial Administration" The Americas 15(2): pp. 139–158
- Meissner, Jochen (1993) Eine Elite im Umbruch: Der Stadtrat von Mexiko zwischen kolonialer Ordnung und unabhangigem Staat, 1761-1821 F. Steiner, Stuttgart, ISBN 3-515-06098-7, in German, (An Elite in the Breach: The Cabildos of Mexico between Colonial Order and the Unforgiving State)
