= Regidor =

Member of a council of municipalities in Spain and Latin America

A regidor (plural: regidores) is a member of a council of municipalities in Spain and Latin America. Portugal also used to have the same office of regedor.

== Mexico ==
In Mexico, an ayuntamiento (municipal council) is composed of a municipal president (mayor), one or two síndicos (attorney general) and several regidores who meet in cabildo (council) sessions. A regidor is the community representative (commissioner) before the municipal government.

The responsibilities of a regidor are:

- To participate in council session and administer the interests of the municipality
- To exert faculties of inspection and oversee the branches of public administration
- To obtain information from the municipal president regarding the services offered by the different dependencies

Some activities of a regidor are:

- Propose or reform of municipal regulations
- Vote on municipal affairs
- To attend a commission assigned to them
- Promote social participation
- Propose measures for municipal development

All municipalities of Aguascalientes have five regidores and one síndico except for the capital, which has ten regidores and two síndicos.

== See also ==
- Corregidor
- Corregimiento
- Alcalde
- Alcalde ordinario
- Sargento mayor
- Cabildo (council)
- Síndico
- Ayuntamiento
- Teniente a guerra
- Santa Hermandad
