= Kingdom of Mexico =

Former territorial entity of the Spanish Empire

Kingdom of Mexico-Tenochtitlan Reino de México-Tenochtitlan (Spanish)
- 1527–1821
- Coat of arms

- Status: Region of the Viceroyalty of New Spain
- Capital: Mexico
- Official languages: Spanish; Nahuatl
- Recognised regional languages: Otomi, Purépecha, Téenek, Mixtec, Zapotec, Mixe, Mazahua, Totonac, Pame, Tepehua, Matlatzinca, Tlahuica, Mazateco, etc.
- Government: Monarchy
- King of Spain
  - 1527-1556: Charles I
  - 1813-1821: Ferdinand VII
- President of the Real Audiencia
  - 1528-1531: Nuño de Guzmán
  - 1810: Pedro Catani
- History
  - Establishment: 13 December 1527
  - Royal Ordinance of Intendancies: 4 December 1786
  - Independence of Mexico: 28 September 1821
Preceded by	Succeeded by
Columbian Viceroyalty	First Mexican Empire

The Kingdom of Mexico (Spanish: Reino de México), officially the Kingdom of Mexico-Tenochtitlan, was an administrative territorial entity within the Spanish Monarchy, governed politically by the Viceroyalty of New Spain from 1535.

Initially, the Kingdom of Mexico was subdivided into the provinces of México, Puebla Los de Ángeles, Antequera, Valladolid, Pánuco and Mérida. During the enforcement of the Constitution of 1812, Mexico, like other kingdoms in the Indies, was incorporated into the Kingdom of Spain as a province, establishing the province of New Spain, which was composed of intendancies.

== History ==
=== Conquest of Mexico ===
In 1518, an expedition was organized, this time under the command of Juan de Grijalva. This expedition explored the coast of the Gulf of Mexico. Entering in Tabasco, Grijalva reached a river that today bears his name, the Grijalva River, and continued to advance to the area of the Jamapa River, near the current port of Veracruz. At this point, the expedition was received by emissaries of Moctezuma II, the aztec ruler of Tenochtitlan. Moctezuma, impressed by the arrival of the Spaniards, believed that they could be sent by the god Quetzalcoatl, whose return was expected according to certain prophecies. Grijalva returned to Cuba with news of the region's riches and samples of gold and other valuable objects, further fueling expectations of riches and new conquests.

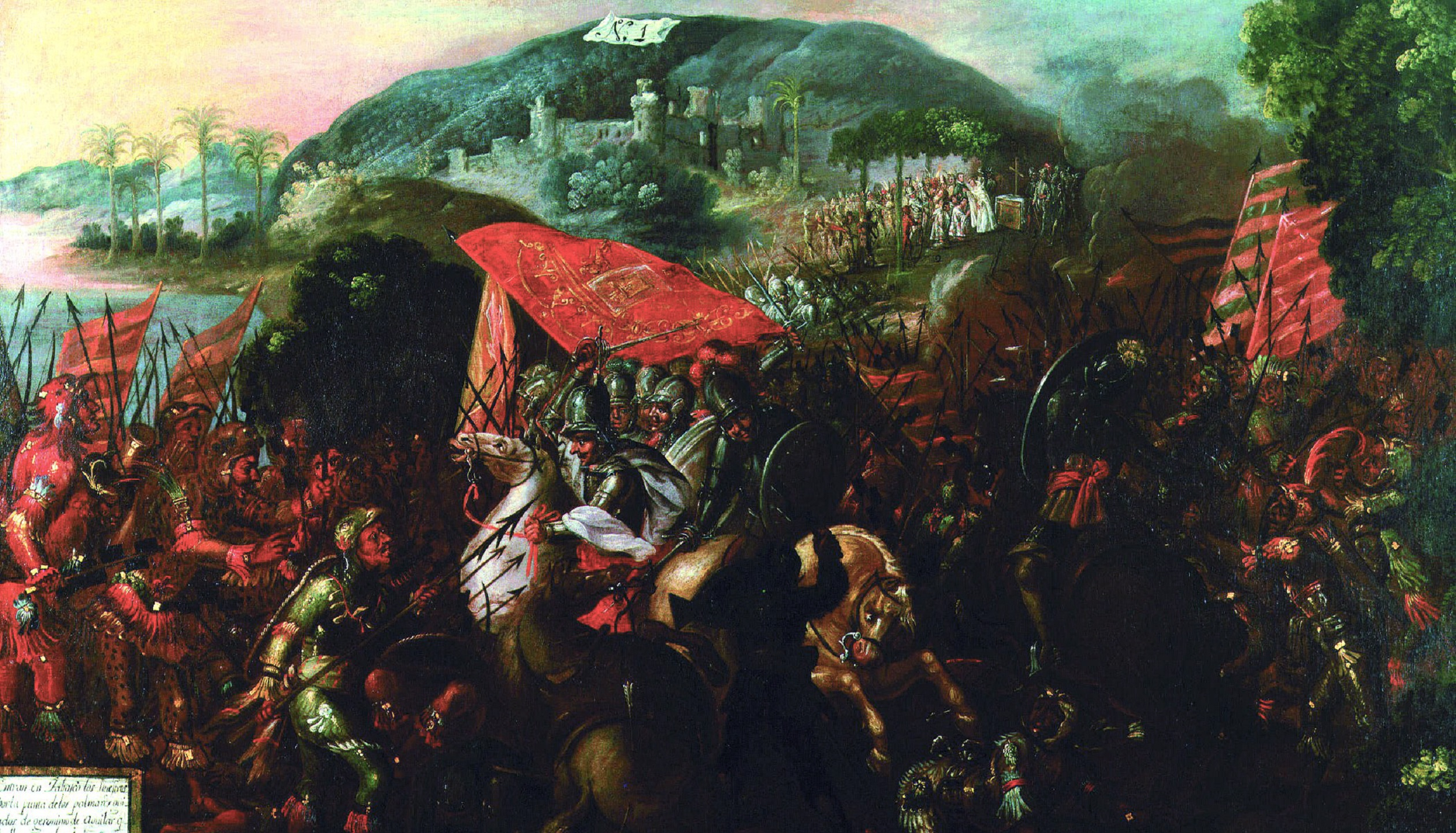
Spaniards entering in Tabasco in 1519.

The definitive incursion into the interior of the territory began on 10 February 1519, Hernán Cortés and his soldiers arrived in Cozumel and reached the coasts of Tabasco, where they fought the Chontales in Centla. In that region, Cortés founded the Villa de Santa María de la Victoria. On 16 August 1519, the Spaniards headed for the coast of Veracruz, where they penetrated the interior of Mesoamerica. They established alliances with some indigenous peoples and advanced to Tenochtitlan. Along the way they defeated the allies of the Mexica, as happened with the Cholula massacre. Moctezuma received the Spanish peacefully in November but the Tóxcatl Massacre in May 1820 put the Mexica on a war footing. Cuitláhuac defeated the invaders in on 30 June 1520. On 22 May 1521, Cortés began the attack of Tenochtitlan, finally taken the 13 August 1521 after a long siege.

=== Establishment ===
The first Spanish kingdom in the territory was established in the year 1521 under the name Kingdom of New Spain, as a kingdom dependent on the Crown of Castile, since the initial funds for exploration came from Queen Isabella I of Castile. Mexico City, on 15 May 1522, was designated by Hernán Cortés as the capital of New Spain and in the same letter it was referred that the decision was made together with the city Cabildo. So the cabildo began its government in the city with the town of Coyoacán as its headquarters. It was not until 8 March 1524 that the first session of the cabildo was recorded in Mexico City. The city council had jurisdiction of 15 leagues around the main square of Mexico.

The Kingdom of Mexico and the Audiencia of Mexico were established on 13 December 1527, after the judicial review of Hernán Cortés, having a viceregal character. From then on, the Kingdom of New Spain no longer comprised the territory of the new kingdom. By the year 1535, the Viceroyalty of New Spain was established, dissolving the homonymous kingdom and making the Kingdom of Mexico an integral territory of the new viceroyalty. The Kingdom of Mexico came to comprise more or less the present-day states of Mexico, Guerrero, Puebla, Michoacán, Hidalgo, Oaxaca, Tlaxcala, Querétaro, part of Jalisco, and Mexico City.

=== Administration ===
Likewise, as the kingdom of the Indies, Mexico had its own special law, the Indiano right, and its respective administrative body, the Council of the Indies. Although the Kingdom of Mexico, being an integral territory of New Spain, was a dependency of Castile, it was also a kingdom in itself, so it was only subject to the monarch of Castile.

The royal representative received one of three titles, Governor, Mayor or Corregidor. It was initially as governor that Hernán Cortés, who in his character of conqueror and noble with the degree of marquis represented the king, to then in 1573 was replaced by a Corregidor, who had powers to intervene, preside over the cabildo, have a casting vote and overcome the decisions of the body of the city council. The first Corregidor of the city was the Spaniard Rodrigo Sánchez de Obregón, who took office on 21 October 1574. At the end of his term and after learning of the death at sea of his successor in 1580, the City Council of Mexico, requested through the procurator, that the appointment of a new corregidor be suspended, which was granted regularly, apparently the intervention of this representative was very annoying because he lacked the appropriate knowledge. In 1592, is formed the Consulate of Merchants of Mexico, the commercial entity that monopolized the control of the internal and foreign trade of the viceroyalty of New Spain.

On 4 December 1786, the Royal Ordinance of Intendancies was signed, creating 11 other intendancies in the viceroyalty, replacing the kingdoms (including the Kingdom of Mexico), commandancies, corregimientos, and alcalde mayors. The intendancies of the army and provinces created by the Royal Ordinance of Intendancies were: the Intendancy of Mexico, which was linked to the office of superintendent, and the rest of the provinces: the Intendancy of Arizpe, the Intendancy of Arizpe, the Intendancy of San Luis Potosí, the Intendancy of Zacatecas, Intendancy of Guadalajara, the Intendancy of Michoacán, the Intendancy de Veracruz, the Intendancy of Puebla, the Intendancy of Oaxaca, the Intendancy of Mérida, and the Intendancy of Guanajuato.

=== Decline ===
On 24 February 1821, Agustín de Iturbide proclaimed the Plan for the Independence of Northern America, which contained a set of seventeen articles known as the Treaty of Córdoba to secure the independence of the continental part of the Viceroyalty of New Spain. The new country's government would be a monarchy, under the name Mexican Empire, whose crown would be offered to Ferdinand VII or another Spanish Infante, thus allowing the monarch to continue governing Mexican territory and restoring the power that the Spanish Constitution of 1812 had taken away from him in Spain. Ethnic distinctions among the inhabitants of the former New Spain were also abolished; equality among all individuals was declared, and from then on, all would have the same rights.

On August 24 of the same year, Iturbide signed the treaty with Juan O'Donojú, Lieutenant General of the Armies of Spain, who had succeeded Apodaca with the title of Supreme Chief of New Spain. This treaty recognized Mexico's independence. On September 27, the Army of the Three Guarantees entered Mexico City. The following day, a council of 38 members, presided over by Iturbide, proclaimed the Act of Independence of the Mexican Empire and formed a Provisional Government Council led by Iturbide, who was given the title of Generalissimo and Serene Highness. Since Ferdinand VII did not recognize Mexico's independence, the parliament of the new Mexican Empire decided that a new monarch would be chosen through elections. The night before the elections, many people took to the streets to express their support for Iturbide as emperor. Iturbide was ultimately elected emperor by a unanimous vote of parliament and was crowned under the name Agustín I of Mexico.

== See also ==
- State of Mexico

== Bibliography ==
- Cabrera Bernat, Ciprián Aurelio (1987). Instituto de Cultura de Tabasco, éd. Viajeros en Tabasco (in Spanish) (1 ed.). Villahermosa, Tabasco: Instituto de Cultura de Tabasco. ISBN 968-889-107-X.
- Ostos, Juan Miralles (2004). Hernán Cortés. Inventor de México.
- Haring, Clarence (1947). The Spanish Empire in America. New York: Oxford University Press.
