= Ignacio José Enseñat Guerra =

Spanish police officer

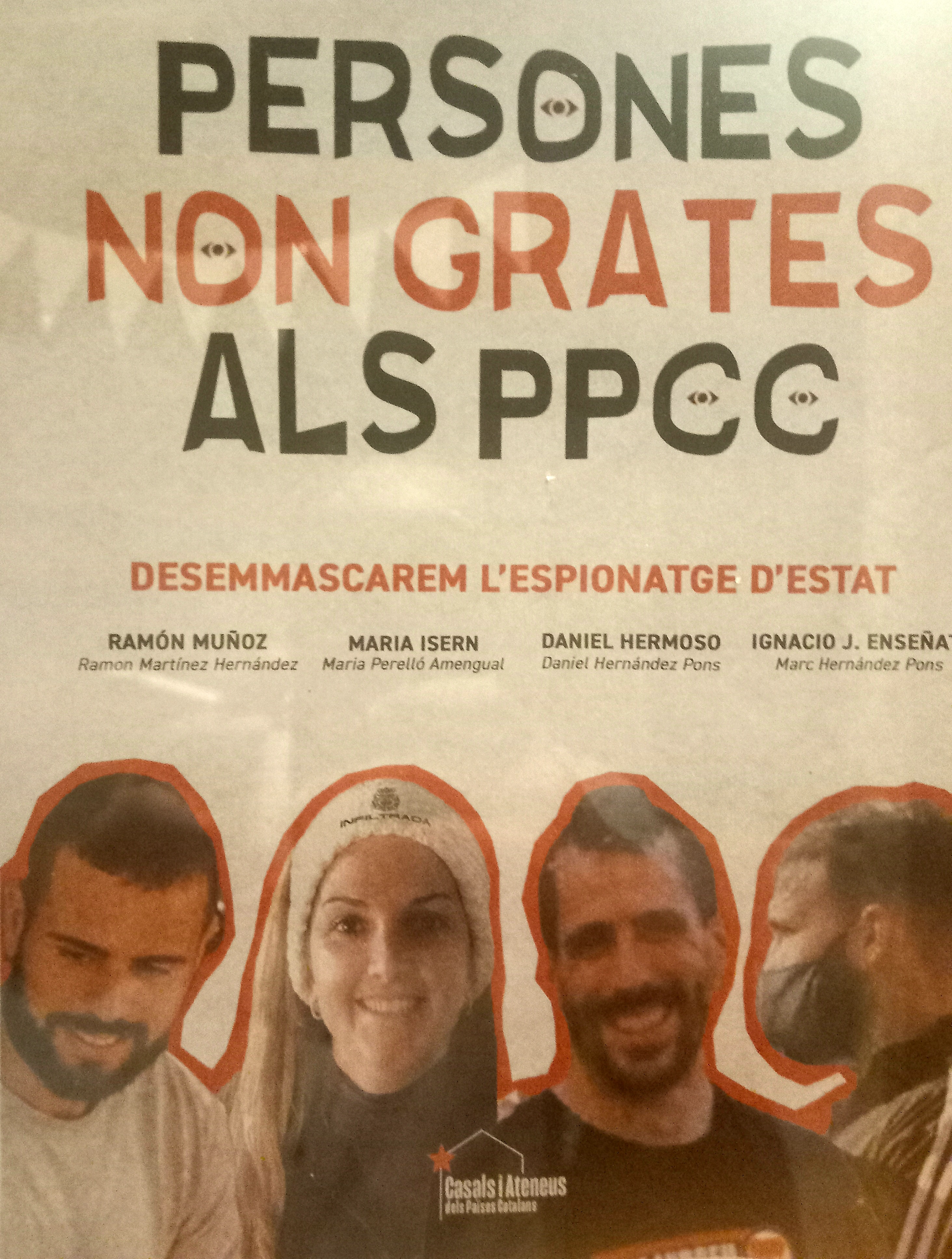
- Born: 1992 or 1993; Menorca
- Education: University of Girona
- Occupations: Criminologist, police officer, double agent
- Years active: 2019 -
- Employer: Spanish National Police Corps
- Known for: Infiltration scandal in Catalan pro-independence and anti-eviction groups

Ignacio José Enseñat Guerra (born in Menorca in 1992 or 1993) is a Spanish police officer of the Spanish National Police Corps. In 2022 an investigation by the Catalan journal La Directa uncovered his role as a double agent for more than two years in various groups of the Catalan pro-independence left and in some anti-eviction and right to housing movements in Barcelona.

His secret task came to light only few weeks after the CatalanGate, the international controversy about the dirty war and cyberespionage conducted by the Spanish intelligence against high-ranked politicians, MPs, journalists and civilians linked to the Catalan independence movement.

== Life ==
The sources note that Enseñat Guerra, reported initially as I.J.E.G and 29 years old in most of the media, was born in the early 1990s in Menorca and played as a goalkeeper in the Unió Esportiva Maó. He studied criminology at the University of Girona thanks to a scholarship that was granted by the Consell Insular de Menorca and later did an internship as a municipal police officer in Girona before he joined the Spanish National Police Corps in June 2019.

His episode as a mole began at the end of 2019 amid the protests against the trial of the leaders of the Catalan independence process, when he was given the mission to enter the Catalan social and pro-independence movements with the false identity of Marc Hernàndez Pon. The police provided him with a false life as a Mallorcan from Palma who worked in a chiringuito during the summer and granted him a university registration at the Faculty of Education of the University of Barcelona (UB), so that in mid-2020 he could begin his infiltration. The false identity also allowed him to open bank accounts and conduct other administrative procedures during that period.

Since then he started increasingly networking with the left-wing student movements of the UB, with the anti-gentrification activist group Resistim al Gòtic and he assisted to a demonstration against the eviction of the Casal Popular Lina de Òdena –for which he ended up being the responsible of economy. 5] Later, he also managed to join the Students' Union of the Catalan Countries (Sindicat d'Estudiants dels Països Catalans, SEPC) and got involved in several protests and actions like those organised by Batec, a youth movement against the weaknesses of the public transport infrastructure in Catalonia.

Several warnings, such as his Menorcan accent instead of the Mallorcan one that he should have (according to his fake life), alerted several colleagues and prevented him from joining the political organisation Endavant. In May 2022, he suddenly disappeared from all the movements he was involved due to alleged personal reasons, shortly before his infiltration scandal was made public by the media.
