= Sargento mayor =

Sargento mayor ("sergeant major") was a rank immediately below that of maestre de campo in the Spanish tercios of the 16th and 17th centuries. Initially second in rank to a coronel ("colonel") in a colunella, the sargento mayor became second in rank to the maestre de campo after the creation of the tercios in 1534. He took care of the tactical training, security and lodging of the troops of the tercio. He also transmitted the orders of the maestre de campo or the capitán general to subordinate officers.

== 16th and 17th centuries ==
Initially second in command below Colonel in a coronelía, the Sargento Mayor later came to occupy the position immediately below the Maestre de Campo after the creation of the tercios in 1534 and until 1600. The rank was in charge of teaching tactics, security and lodging of tercio troops. Would also delegate orders from the Maestre de Campo or the Capitán General to lower level officers.

== Nineteenth century ==
In Argentina, since the 1813 law in which ranks where divided into three groups, Oficiales generales, oficiales jefes y oficiales (general officers, lead officers, and officers), the rank of Sargento Mayor was part Oficiales jefes (lead officers), intermediately above Capitán (and officer) and intermediately below Teniente Coronel (Lieutenant Colonel), with the latter below Coronel (Colonel), from where a promotion lead to the Oficiales Generales (General officers).

== Today ==
Chevron for SM Sargento Mayor in the Colombia Army.

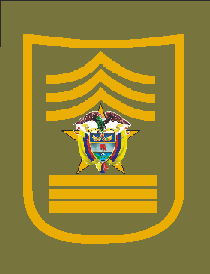
Chevron for CM Comisario at the Colombia National Police.

In Colombia, Sargento Mayor is the top rank within the sub-officers of Colombia Armed Forces as well as the National Police; the rank is intermediately above Sargento Primero (First Sergeant). In the executive level of the Colombia National Police, it is equivalent to the rank of Comisario. In Colombia's Military Forces there are three levels of Sargento Mayor.

== See also ==
- Teniente a guerra
- Santa Hermandad
- Corregidor
- Alcalde
- Alcalde ordinario
- Corregidor
- Cabildo (council)
- Regidor
- Síndico
- Ayuntamiento
- Corregimiento
- Alcalde de la Santa Hermandad
