= Teniente a guerra =

War lieutenant of the Spanish colonial Empire

Teniente a guerra (roughly translated into English as "War lieutenant") was a title used in times of the Spanish colonial Empire to describe a position exercising duties similar to those exercised by a town or city mayor today. A teniente a guerra was a position that combined the duties of mayor, military lieutenant and justice of the peace.

== Description ==
The position was a combination of military commandant and civil superintendent that the Spanish Crown, via its colonial governors in each of its oversees provinces, such as Puerto Rico and Santo Domingo, planted in each district to oversee a region of the governed territory. The position of teniente a guerra was established in Ponce in the 1680s. The United States judiciary has called this position a "royal alcalde".

== Powers, obligations and alternates ==
People holding this position were authorized and empowered to perform the following duties: provide for public safety, levy contributions, collect taxes, carry out orders and circulars of the governor, and administer justice. When the teniente a guerra was not available (sickness, travel, incapacity or death) they were substituted by a sargento mayor. The sargento mayor was the leader of an urban militia in town. The urban militia the sargento mayor led was in charge of patrolling and guarding the urban areas, capturing criminals, delivery of official documents, transportation and movement of prisoners, opening and maintenance of trails, town policing, and the protecting and defending the perimeter to avoid contraband.

== See also ==
- Corregidor
- Alcalde
- Alcalde ordinario
- Sargento mayor
- Corregidor
- Cabildo (council)
- Regidor
- Síndico
- Ayuntamiento
- Corregimiento
- Santa Hermandad
- Alcalde de la Santa Hermandad
