= Alcalde ordinario =

Spanish Viceroyalties in the Americas officials

Alcalde ordinario refers to the judicial and administrative officials in the cabildos in the Spanish Viceroyalties in the Americas during the times of the Spanish Empire in the 16th through 19th centuries. Always existing in pairs, they were called Alcalde de primer voto (roughly, "first mayor") and Alcalde de segundo voto (roughly, "second mayor"). The alcalde ordinario was a judicial magistrate who, with some exceptions, was responsible for the administration of civil and criminal justice within their municipal jurisdiction.

== Historical background ==
Spanish cabildos in the Americas were the local government institutions in the American cities founded by the Spanish. (Note: The Spanish cabildos in the Americas were termed "colonial" despite the fact that the Indies were kingdoms dependent on the Spanish Crown at Castile, but not colonies subordinate to it.) Their jurisdiction included not only the urban area of the city but the adjacent rural areas as well. This jurisdiction was roughly equivalent to today's concept of "municipio" in many countries. When within the rural expanse of a cabildo a cluster of human dwellers formed, it would not be considered a village, town or city until it had its own "cabildo". Without a city there was no cabildo, and without a cabildo there was no city. Likewise, without a cabildo, there was no alcalde ordinario, and without alcalde ordinario, there was no cabildo. The post of alcalde ordinario was created by the Spanish Crown in 1537.

== Length of service ==
Cabildos in the Americas had two Alcaldes Ordinarios and a variable number of regidores, based on the importance of the city. Each of the two alcaldes ordinarios was responsible for specific duties. The initial appointment of the first two alcalde ordinarios was the responsibility of the founder of the town, with subsequent appointments taking place –traditionally– on 1 January each year, with the officials leaving the posts typically appointing their own successors. Their term generally ended on the first day of the new year.

Some posts were obtained via a sort of public bidding system, but not the Alcalde Ordinario. This practice was consistent with the significant amount of responsibility the post represented. The term of service was typically one year, and the same official could not be re-elected until a certain period of time had passed with the post being occupied by a different person. It was an honorary post, as no remuneration was received in exchange. On the contrary, it was oftentimes considered a burdensome public post from which the individual chosen could not escape. Nevertheless, the post honored and brought prestige to the individual who agreed to carry on with the responsibility.

== Functions ==
There were two alcalde ordinarios: "De Primer Voto" (First Vote Alcalde Ordinario) and "De Segundo Voto" (Second Vote Alcalde Ordinario). During former times they were called "Justicia Mayor" and "Justicia", respectively. Their functions included law-enforcement and judicial functions, watching for the public order and public safety, and the administration of justice, both civil and criminal justice. Administration of Justice took place in an alternating fashion. One of the two would carry out civil and criminal justice and would be relieved by the other Alcalde Mayor. Another custom was to have the Alcalde Ordinario de Primer Voto carry out criminal justice, while the Alcalde Ordinario de Segundo Voto would attend to civil justice matters. This was the lowest level justice system. Also, when the territorial governor or his lieutenant were not available, then the Alcalde de Primer Voto would perform as the head of the cabildo and carry out the business of city hall. If the alcalde de primer voto wasn't available (sick, away, on vacation, etc.), then the alcalde de segundo voto would take charge of running the cabildo. As their jurisdictions were both urban and rural, in 1606 the system was modified to create the posts of Alcalde de la Santa Hermandad, with one alcalde ordinario being in charge of the southern district of the jurisdiction while the other would take charge of the northern district. With the issuance of Royal Decree of 25 June 1804, the alcalde ordinario was also vested with powers to aid the governor in the investigation of criminal actas that carried the death penalty.

== Qualifications ==
The Alcalde ordinario was generally a layperson, that is, not versed in law. However, although this shortcoming was customarily overlooked in favor of possessing a positive attitude and common sense, it was mandatory that those chosen for these posts be among the most tried and tested individuals in the jurisdiction, and that they were also honest men who were also educated and could read and write. The men chosen for alcalde ordinario were to be men who were known to be good neighbors, and who possessed and occupied a house in the city where they were to serve. According to a decree from king Phillip II, preference was to be given to the descendants of the first settlers, since such descendants were considered to be vested with the same rights as the Spanish men born in Spain (Peninsulares).

== Compared with similar titles ==
Some sources appear to suggest that the term Alcalde ordinario was used as a way to differentiate the administrative magistrate of a jurisdiction (called "Alcalde") from the military commandant (called Alcalde de la Santa Hermandad), as both terms were in concurrent use during the 18th century. For example, Andres R. Mendez Muñoz (Hereditas, Vol 8, #1, 2007, pp. 3–15.) distinguishes between the administrative magistrate and the military commandant by adding "ordinario" (ordinary) to those alcaldes that performed during the times when the Alcaldes de la Santa Hermandad also performed.

Historian Aida R. Caro de Delgado also makes this distinction when she details the functions of both in her 1965 work El Cabildo o Régimen Municipal Puertorriqueño en el Siglo XVIII. However, in another one of her publications, one titled Legislación Municipal Puertorriqueña del Siglo XVIII, published six years later, she unequivocally uses the position of alcalde ordinario as another name for the position of a justicia.

== See also ==
- Cabildo
- Presidente municipal
- Corregidor
- Alcalde
- Sargento mayor
- Cabildo
- Regidor
- Síndico
- Ayuntamiento
- Teniente a guerra
- Corregimiento
- Municipio
- Municipalidad

== Sources ==
- Alcalde from the Handbook of Texas Online
- "Alcalde" in the Diccionario de la Real Academia Española.
- Corominas, Joan and José A Pascual. Diccionario crítico etimológico castellano e hispánico, 7 vols. Madrid, Editorial Gredos, 1981. ISBN 8424913620
- Haring, C. H., The Spanish Empire in America. New York, Oxford University Press, 1947.
- O'Callaghan, Joseph F. A History of Medieval Spain. Ithaca, NY: Cornell University Press. 1975. ISBN 0801408806
