= Alcalde =

Spanish municipal magistrate

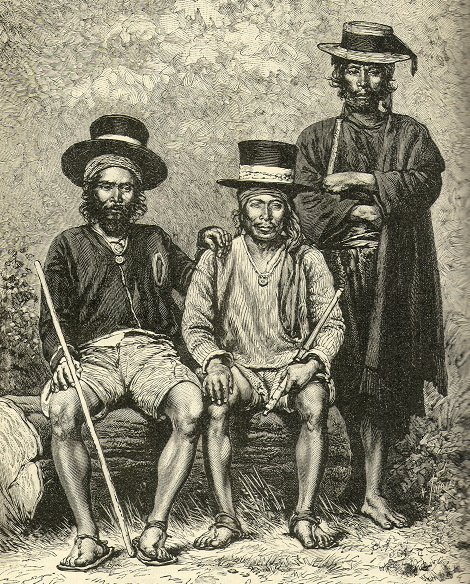
Mayan alcaldes from Guatemala, 1891

Alcalde (/ælˈkældi/; Spanish: [alˈkalde]) is the traditional Spanish municipal magistrate, who had both judicial and administrative functions. An alcalde was, in the absence of a corregidor, the presiding officer of the Castilian cabildo (the municipal council) and judge of first instance of a town. Alcaldes were elected annually, without the right to reelection for two or three years, by the regidores (council members) of the municipal council. The office of the alcalde was signified by a staff of office, which they were to take with them when doing their business. In modern Spanish, an alcalde is simply a mayor. A woman who holds the office is termed an alcaldesa.

In New Spain (Mexico), alcaldes mayores were chief administrators in colonial-era administrative territories termed alcaldías mayores; in colonial-era Peru the units were called corregimientos.

Alcalde was also a title given to Indigenous (Native American) leaders inside the Spanish missions, who performed a large variety of duties for the Franciscan missionaries.

== Medieval origins ==
The office of the alcalde evolved during the Reconquista as new lands were settled by the expanding kingdoms of León and Castile. As fortified settlements in the area between the Douro and Tagus rivers became true urban centers, they gained, from their feudal lords or the kings of Leon and Castile, the right to have councils. Among the rights that these councils had was to elect a municipal judge (iudex in Latin and juez in Spanish). These judges were assisted in their duties by various assistant judges, called alcaldes, whose number depended on the number of parishes the town had. The title alcalde was borrowed from the Arabic al qaḍi (قاضي), meaning "the judge."

The word alcalde originally was used for simple judges, as in Andalusian Arabic. Only later was it applied to the presiding municipal magistrate. This early use continued to be reflected in its other uses, such as alcaldes del crimen, the judges in the audiencias; Alcaldes de la Casa y Corte de Su Majestad, who formed the highest tribunal in Castile and also managed the royal court; alcaldes mayores, a synonym for corregidor; and alcaldes de barrio, who were roughly the equivalent of British parish constables. Because of this, the municipal alcalde was often referred to as an alcalde ordinario.

== The classic cabildo, fifteenth to nineteenth centuries ==
By the end of the fourteenth century the definite form of the Castilian municipal council, the ayuntamiento or cabildo, had been established. The council was limited to a maximum of twenty-four members (regidores), who may be appointed for life by the crown, hold the office as an inherited possession or be elected by the citizens (vecinos) of the municipality. (Many cabildos had a mix of these different types of regidores.) The number of magistrates, now definitely called alcaldes, was limited to one or two, depending on the size of the city and who were elected annually by the regidores. To ensure control over cabildos, the Castilian monarchs often appointed a corregidor, who took over the role of the presiding officer of the council. The cabildo was taken to the Americas and Philippines by the Spanish conquistadors. Towns and villages in the Americas with the right to a council (villas and lugares in the Recopilación de las Leyes de Indias, 1680) had one alcalde. Cities (ciudades) had two, which was the maximum number anywhere. Early in the conquest, adelantados had the right to appoint the alcaldes in the districts they settled, if they could attract the legally specified number of settlers to the area. This right could be inherited for one generation, after which the right of election returned to the municipal council.

== Modern usage ==
In modern Spanish, the term alcalde is equivalent to a mayor, and is used to mean the local executive officer in municipalities throughout Spain and Latin America. For example, the title alcalde continued to be used in the Spanish-speaking American Commonwealth of Puerto Rico after the occupation of the island during the Spanish–American War in 1898. In the autonomous Spanish cities of Ceuta and Melilla, however, the alcaldes-presidentes have greater powers than their peninsular colleagues.

Because the United States incorporated parts of the former Viceroyalty of New Spain, the office had some influence in the local political and legal developments of those areas and is mentioned in judicial cases. This title continued to be in use in the Southwest United States after the Mexican–American War until a permanent political and judicial system could be established. Alcaldes were notorious for their support for rule of law and opposition to vigilantes. In nineteenth-century California, Stephen Johnson Field, later an associate justice of the U.S. Supreme Court, once served as the only alcalde of Marysville, California, a town established in 1850 during the Gold Rush by immigrants, who temporarily used the Spanish and Mexican form of municipal government. In Texas, the position of county judge was based on that of the alcalde which had existed in the state prior to the Texas Revolution. Like the alcaldes before them, county judges under the Texas Constitution wield both judicial and chief executive functions. Although in larger counties today the county judge usually functions solely as county chief executive, in smaller counties, the role of the county judge continues to have many of the combined judicial and administrative functions of the alcalde.

The city of Sonoma, California, has a tradition to name an honorary title of Alcalde/Alcaldesa to preside over ceremonial events of the city, with "mayor" being the official position of city governor.

In Belize, any rural community may appoint an alcalde. The alcalde serves both judicial and administrative functions and is paid a small stipend by the government. The alcalde is responsible for managing communal land, judging disputes, and determining punishment for petty crimes. This type of local government is most commonly used by Maya communities in southern Belize.

== See also ==
- Alcalde ordinario
- Presidente municipal
- Mayor
- Sargento mayor
- Corregidor
- Cabildo
- Regidor
- Síndico
- Chief of the King's Guard (Portugal and Castile)
- Ayuntamiento
- Teniente a guerra
- Corregimiento
- Santa Hermandad

== Sources ==
- Alcalde from the Handbook of Texas Online
- "Alcalde" in the Diccionario de la Real Academia Española.
- Corominas, Joan and José A Pascual. Diccionario crítico etimológico castellano e hispánico, 7 vols. Madrid, Editorial Gredos, 1981. ISBN 84-249-1362-0
- Haring, C. H., The Spanish Empire in America. New York, Oxford University Press, 1947.
- O'Callaghan, Joseph F. A History of Medieval Spain. Ithaca, Cornell University Press, 1975. ISBN 0-8014-0880-6
