= Salazar de las Palmas =

Coordinates: 7°46′25″N 72°48′44″W

- Municipality of Colombia
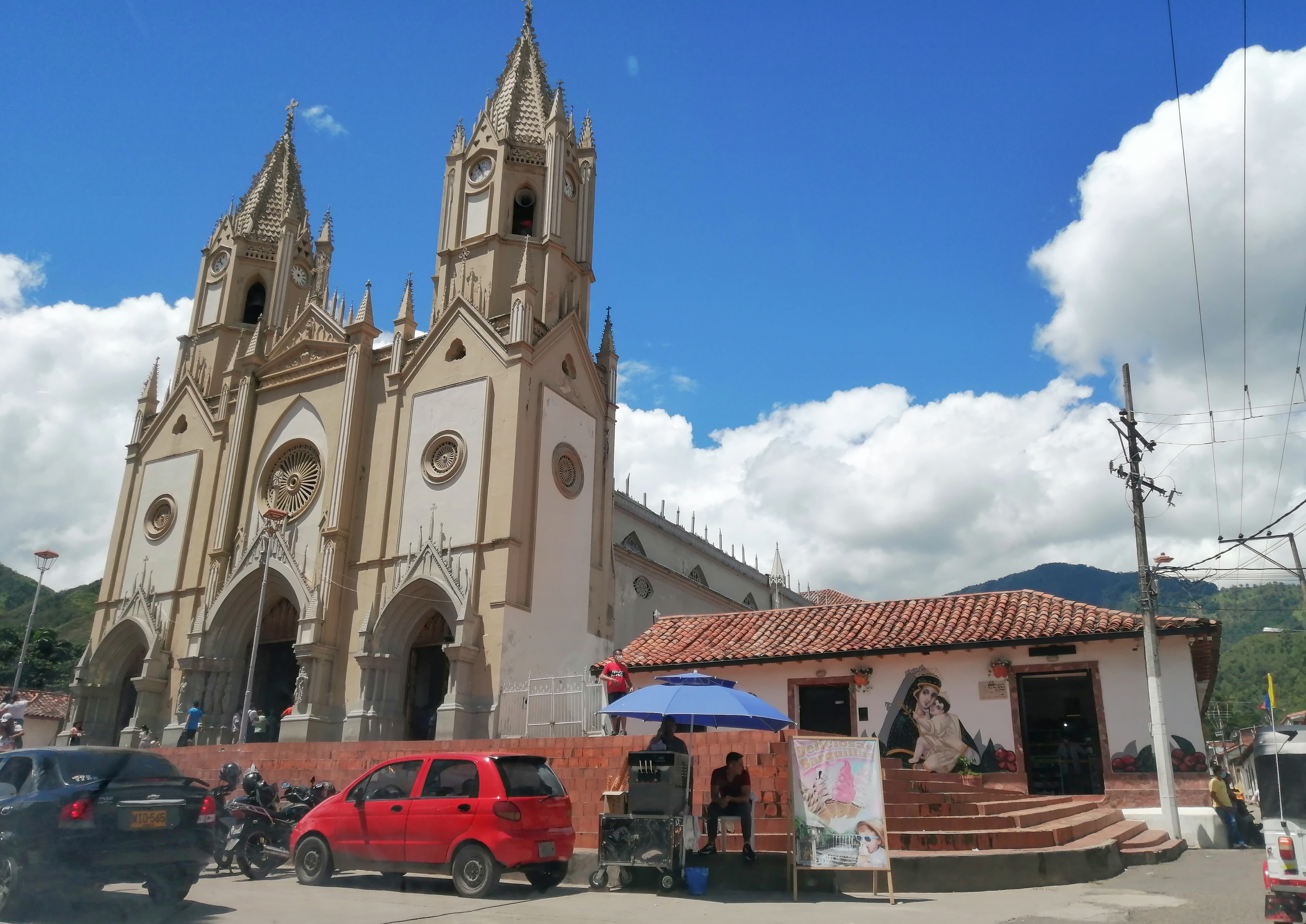
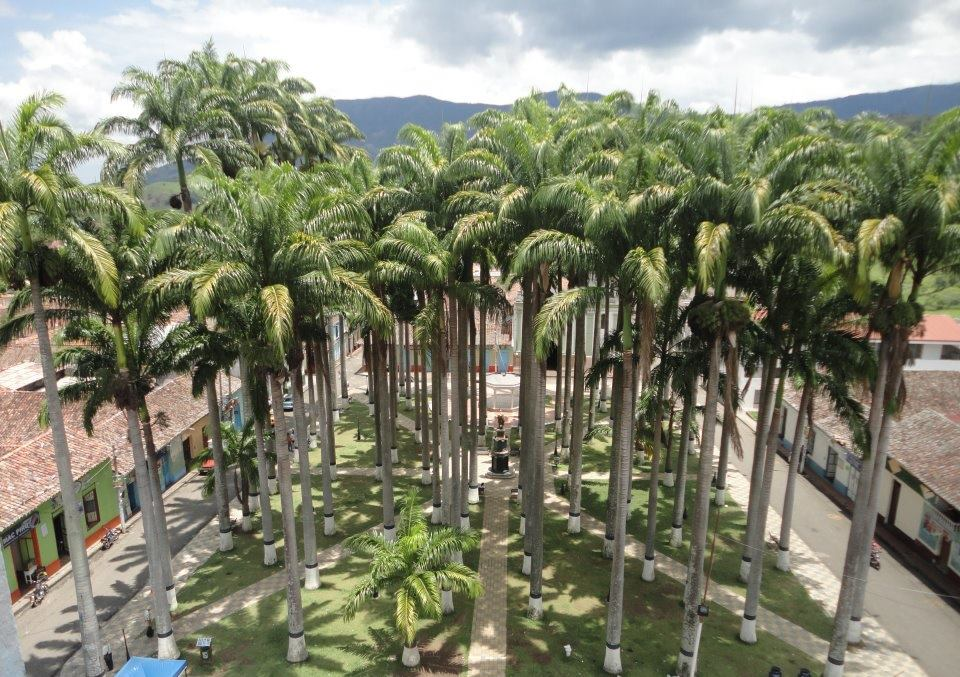
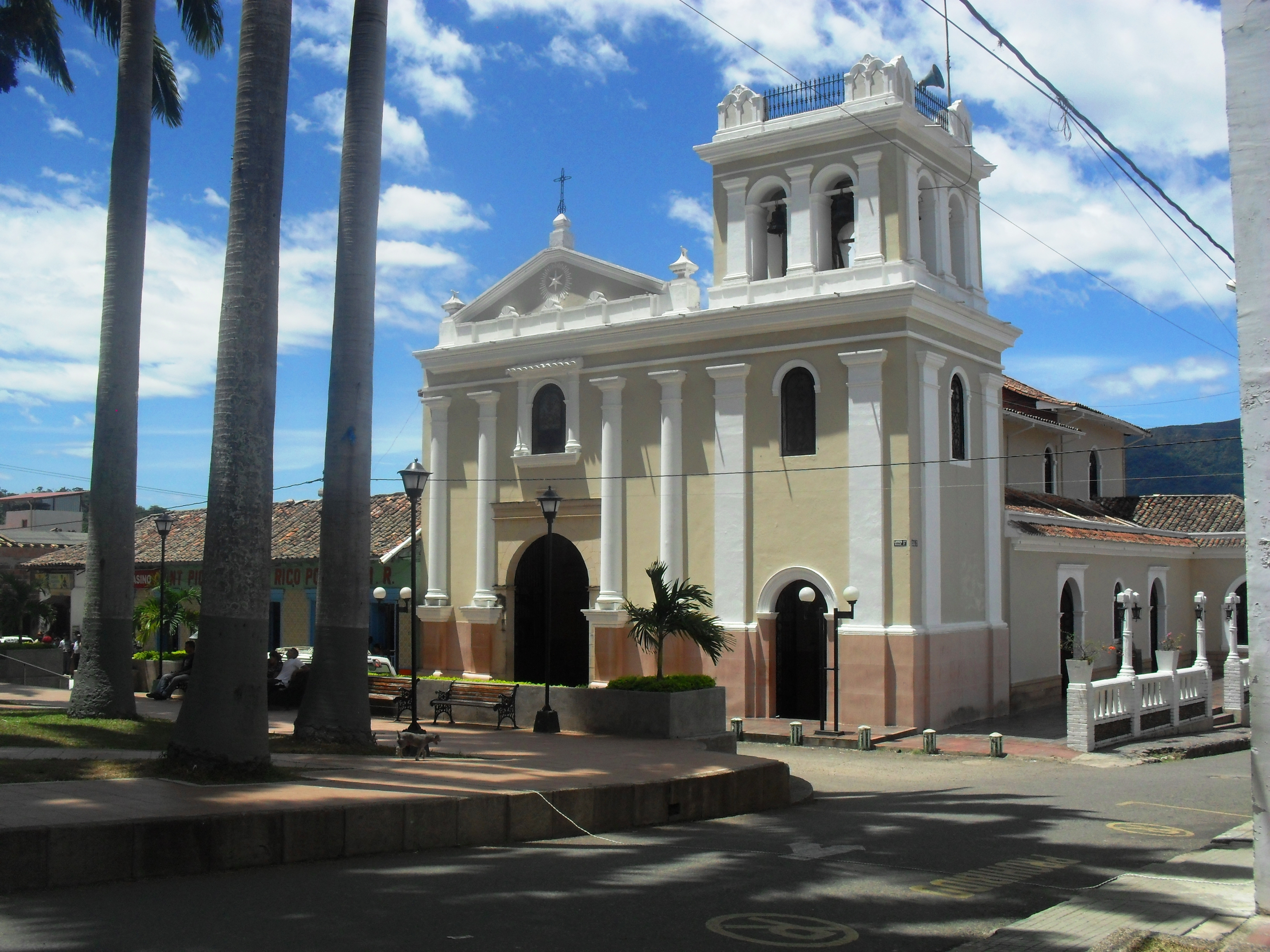
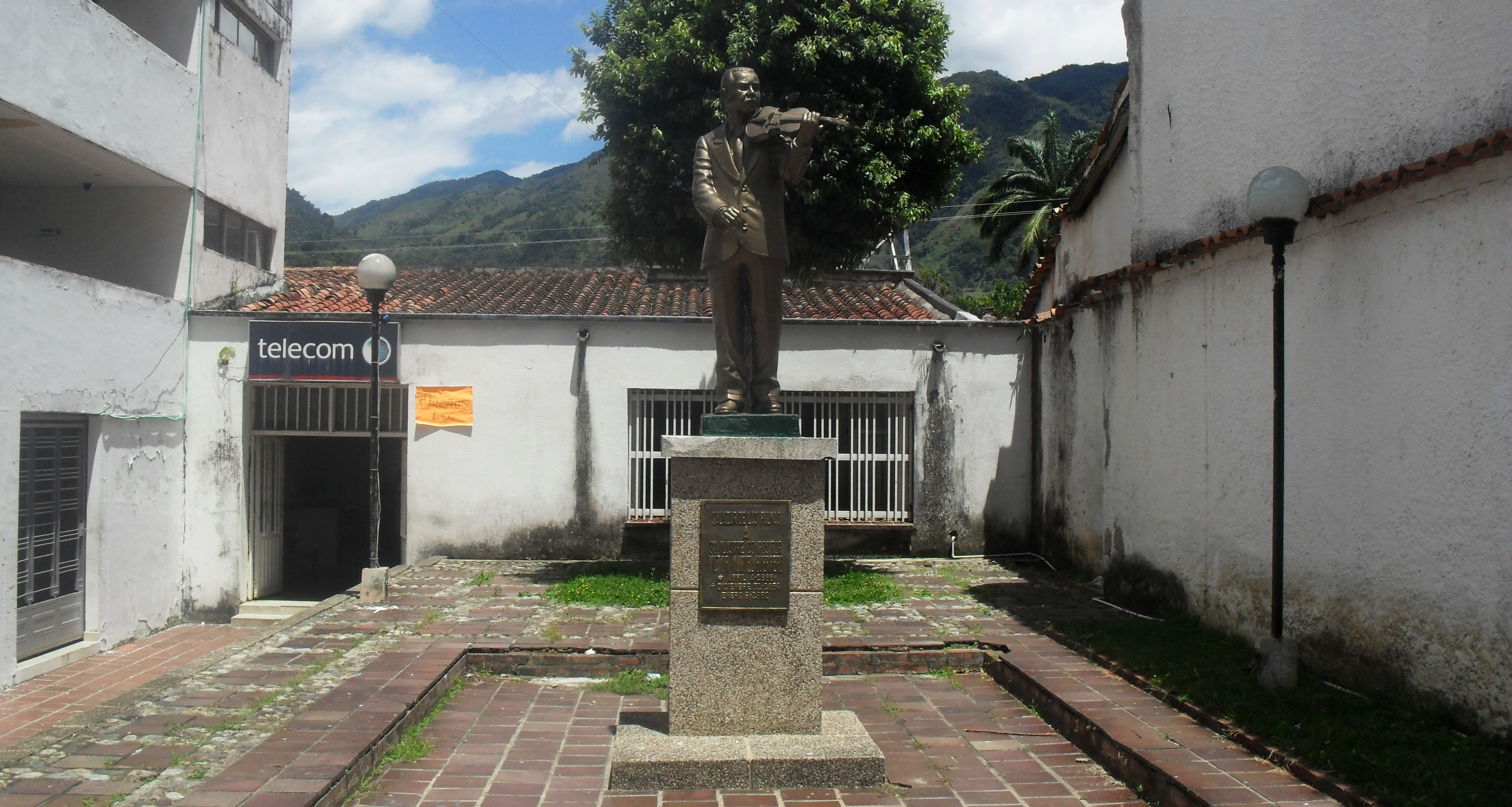
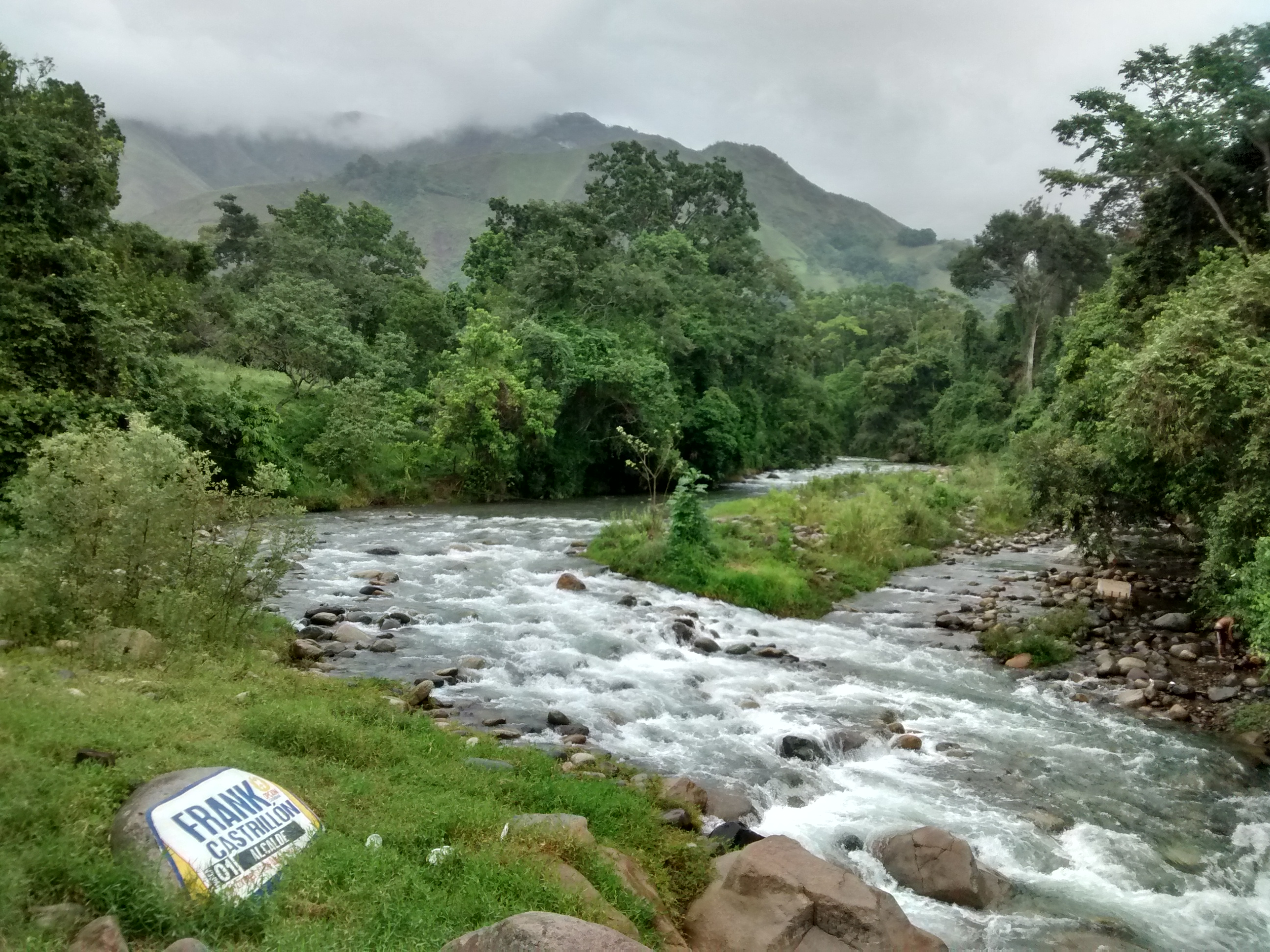
- Clockwise from top: San Pablo Parish, Virgen de Belén Chapel, Salazar River, Víctor Guerrero Monument and Cinera Park

- Flag Coat of arms

- Location of the municipality and town of Salazar de las Palmas in the Norte de Santander Department of Colombia.
- Country: Colombia
- Department: Norte de Santander Department

Area
  - Municipality of Colombia: 34 km^{2} (13 sq mi)
- Elevation: 845 m (2,772 ft)

Population (2015)
  - Municipality of Colombia: 8,964
  - Density: 260/km^{2} (680/sq mi)
  - Urban: 3,747
- Time zone: UTC-5 (Colombia Standard Time)

Salazar de las Palmas (Spanish pronunciation: [salaˈsaɾ ðe las ˈpalmas]) is a Colombian municipality and town located in the department of North of Santander.

== Etymology ==
The municipality bears the name of Salazar in honor of the oidor Alonso Pérez de Salazar, in addition to the fact that "Las Palmas" refers to the fact that when the town was established it was characterized by a large vegetation of palm trees.

== History ==
In 1583, Captain Alonso Esteban Rangel founded Salazar de las Palmas. The village was established to facilitate access to the Madgalena River in the New Kingdom of Granada, in addition to creating a new frontier with the Motilones natives.

== Heritage sites ==
The construction of the parish church of San Pablo began in 1889, it was blessed by the bishop of the Diocese of Nueva Pamplona, Evaristo Blanco in 1915. It is estimated that the cost of the construction of the church was two hundred and fifty thousand dollars. As of 1953, the municipal seat had two churches, the parish of San Pablo with a modern style architecture and the old chapel of Belén, made of adobe and tapia materials. The Belén chapel suffered damage to one of its towers after the earthquake of 1875. The chapel has an retable of Nuestra Señora de Belén, which is believed to have been found by a woman named Lucía in one of the stones of the Trinidad Creek in the 1600s.

== Nature reserves ==
The Santurban Regional Natural Park in Salazar de las Palmas comprises approximately 19,088 hectares delimited by CORPONOR. The municipality also has several lagoons such as Los Bueyes, Peroneo and Triaca. Salazar has the northern lagoon complex of Cáchira (Spanish: Complejo Lagunar Norte Cáchira), which also includes parts of the Arboledas and Cáchira municipalities. The Regional Natural Park, abbreviated as PNR, was declared by agreement number 020 of 2013 and it is located in the northern lagoon complex.

== Climate ==
Climate data for Salazar de las Palmas (Francisco Romero), elevation 1,000 m (3,300 ft), (1981–2010)
| Month | Jan | Feb | Mar | Apr | May | Jun | Jul | Aug | Sep | Oct | Nov | Dec | Year |
|---|---|---|---|---|---|---|---|---|---|---|---|---|---|
| Mean daily maximum °C (°F) | 26.3 (79.3) | 26.5 (79.7) | 26.7 (80.1) | 27.4 (81.3) | 28.3 (82.9) | 28.2 (82.8) | 28.5 (83.3) | 29.3 (84.7) | 29.2 (84.6) | 28.1 (82.6) | 27.1 (80.8) | 26.3 (79.3) | 27.7 (81.9) |
| Daily mean °C (°F) | 21.7 (71.1) | 22.0 (71.6) | 22.4 (72.3) | 22.9 (73.2) | 23.3 (73.9) | 23.1 (73.6) | 23.1 (73.6) | 23.5 (74.3) | 23.5 (74.3) | 23.0 (73.4) | 22.5 (72.5) | 21.9 (71.4) | 22.7 (72.9) |
| Mean daily minimum °C (°F) | 17.8 (64.0) | 18.0 (64.4) | 18.6 (65.5) | 19.3 (66.7) | 19.1 (66.4) | 18.6 (65.5) | 18.2 (64.8) | 18.5 (65.3) | 18.5 (65.3) | 18.4 (65.1) | 18.3 (64.9) | 17.8 (64.0) | 18.5 (65.3) |
| Average precipitation mm (inches) | 127.9 (5.04) | 123.4 (4.86) | 158.9 (6.26) | 288.9 (11.37) | 257.6 (10.14) | 76.5 (3.01) | 88.2 (3.47) | 144.0 (5.67) | 280.7 (11.05) | 444.4 (17.50) | 418.6 (16.48) | 239.4 (9.43) | 2,648.4 (104.27) |
| Average precipitation days | 13 | 12 | 14 | 18 | 16 | 13 | 13 | 14 | 17 | 21 | 20 | 17 | 187 |
| Average relative humidity (%) | 82 | 81 | 83 | 82 | 79 | 77 | 75 | 74 | 75 | 79 | 83 | 83 | 79 |
| Mean monthly sunshine hours | 148.8 | 115.7 | 102.3 | 96.0 | 130.2 | 147.0 | 164.3 | 182.9 | 165.0 | 155.0 | 138.0 | 139.5 | 1,684.7 |
| Mean daily sunshine hours | 4.8 | 4.1 | 3.3 | 3.2 | 4.2 | 4.9 | 5.3 | 5.9 | 5.5 | 5.0 | 4.6 | 4.5 | 4.6 |
Source: Instituto de Hidrologia Meteorologia y Estudios Ambientales
