= La Argentina, Huila =

Coordinates: 2.19611°N 75.98°W

- Municipality and town
- Flag Coat of arms

- Location of the municipality and town of La Argentina, Huila in the Huila Department of Colombia.
- Country: Colombia
- Department: Huila Department

Area
  - Total: 626 km^{2} (242 sq mi)

Population (Census 2018)
  - Total: 12,475
  - Density: 19.9/km^{2} (51.6/sq mi)
- Time zone: UTC-5 (Colombia Standard Time)

La Argentina is a town and municipality in the Huila Department, Colombia.
