= Corregidor (position) =

Spanish administrative position

A corregidor (Spanish: [korexiˈðoɾ]) was a local administrative and judicial official in the Spanish Empire. Corregidors were the representatives of the royal jurisdiction over a town and its district. The name comes from the Spanish word corregir, meaning "to correct". Monarchs used corregidors to strengthen royal authority in their colonies or districts, and because of the ties to the crown they were often seen as oppressive.

A corregidor held the position of highest authority over a corregimiento. In the Spanish Americas and the Spanish Philippines, a corregidor was often called an alcalde mayor. Also in Spanish America, the magistrate of an Indian community was called corregidor de Indios, and these positions were bought from the Spanish government. They began to be appointed in Pre-Spanish Imperial fourteenth century Castile.

== Development in Spain ==
The idea of appointing Crown officials to oversee local affairs was inspired by the late-medieval revival of Roman law. The goal was to create an administrative bureaucracy, which was uniformly trained in the Roman model. In spite of the opposition of council towns and the Cortes (Parliament), Castilian kings began to appoint direct representatives in towns during fourteenth century. They were also called jueces del salario or alcaldes veedores but the term corregidor prevailed. The word regidor often means town councillor in the Spanish language. Thus, co-regidor was the position intended to co-rule the town together with elected councillors.

The first monarch to make extensive use of corregidores was Alfonso X, who ascended to the throne at the age of eleven. In order to consolidate royal authority and reward the newer nobility and certain great magnates who supported him, he greatly expanded the use of the office. Some bishops and local lords were given the right to appoint corregidores in their territories. Henry III used them mostly in Andalusia, the Basque provinces and Galicia, areas where royal power was weakest. The definitive consolidation of the institution occurred during the reign of the Catholic Monarchs (1474–1516). Corregidores were crucial for the state building process that both monarchs ushered in. Their job was to collect taxes, to report to the crown on the state of affairs in the area, and to ensure that royal jurisdiction was not interfered with by members of the church or the nobility.

As representatives of the royal power, corregidores administered justice, both criminal and civil, in the first instance (or on appeal in districts with alcaldes ordinarios), presided over the town council and ruled a district called a corregimiento. They were audited and controlled through the juicio de residencia (a general audit and review at the end of their term in office) or by means of visitas (literally, 'visits'; more accurately, 'inspections'), which could occur at any point in their term in response to complaints. The corregimiento became the basic unit of state administration in early modern Spain.

After the War of Succession, the new Bourbon kings introduced them into the Aragonese territories, replacing the bailes and vegueres, who, nevertheless, had very similar functions to Castilian corregidores.

== Introduction into the Americas and the Philippines ==
The institution was established also in Spanish America during the conquest and the Spanish Philippines, where it was also known by the names justicia mayor and alcalde mayor (not to be confused with the alcaldes ordinarios of the cabildo). In Indian areas the office was known as the corregidor de indios. Corregidores essentially had the same powers and duties as governors (gobernadores), except that whereas the latter ruled over a province-sized area (called variously a gobernación or a provincia), the corregidor administered a district-sized corregimiento. The corregidores were introduced in the mid-16th century to replace the encomiendas, which had become a source of autonomous power for the settlers. It was a decades-long process. The corregidores were given this privileged position either due to having influential families in Spain, or through paying the crown and in return being appointed. The reformed Audiencia of New Spain began implementing them in the 1530s, but they were not successfully set up in the Viceroyalty of Peru until the administration of Toledo. As the encomiendas were phased out, corregidores oversaw most of the local repartimientos. Corregidores were the pillar for the crown, and the system of colonial domination. Whether it was a cacique or another representative that was used by the Spanish: as a broker between the indigenous Indians, and the Spanish conquerors, they answered to these corregidores. As a crown appointed official, they were served as an intermediary within the crown, the viceroy who was the top of the colonial administration, and of the riches of the Americas. The corregidores ensured that the product of indigenous labor such as farming, mining, sweatshop produce and other production would be handed to the Spanish. The corregidores also served to manage the demands of landowners and merchants, who were eager to take the maximum amounts of profits from indigenous labor. One huge issue was that the indigenous population, due to demands from the higher ups, could not reach the large quotas and were dying due to newly brought diseases from the Europeans that they were not immune to, as well being overworked, and the brutality that the European colonizers conducted. Appointed by the crown, the corregidores served as the crown official, overseer, account taker, negotiator, and slave driver. The corregidores was known to be the wealthiest, most powerful and most hated official in the colony.

By law neither corregidores nor governors (nor viceroys, for that matter) could be persons who resided in the district in which they ruled, so that they should not develop ties to the locality, such that they remain disinterested administrators and judges. For this reason, they were also forbidden to marry in their district, although they could apply for exemptions from this restriction. However, in reality, they largely became enmeshed with local society, especially through financial ties, since their pay was based on a proportion of local royal revenues, and this was often an insufficient amount to cover living costs, much less the costs incurred in traveling to America. Corregidores often invested in the local economy, received loans from locals, and could abuse the reparto de comercio monopoly they oversaw, which often led to corruption.

Since the corregidors held the highest stauts in their districts, the power that their position held often went unchecked. Most of the corregidors had little or no experience in the area of ruling a colony and officiating because there were no qualifications, they only needed enough money to buy the position. With the combination of little experience and unchecked power, abuses of power from corregidors were common in colonial Spanish America. One major form of corruption was repartimientos de mercancías, or the forced distribution of goods. This forced native populations to both sell and buy goods at unfavorale prices to them. Another example of power abuse by the corregidors was the confiscation of land. They took land away from Indigenous people who were in debt, and then sold it to wealthy people in the colonies. Most of this confiscated land was sold to wealthy elites to expand haciendas and other elite's settlements. These are just two of the abuses of power that corregidors took part in during their rule.

For all of the powers that corregidors took advantage of both legitimately and illegitimately, there was lots of restrictions on the position. Some examples have been previously mentioned such as they could not live in the district that they ruled nor could they marry someone from the district that they ruled. Corregidor's sons were also forbidden from marrying someone in their colony. These limitations could have negative impacts since there was no emotional tie to the corregimiento. Some other restrictions that were placed on the corregidor position were that they could not buy or build a house in theirjurisdiction, could not establish an estate, and could not purchase a boat. They were also prohibited from personally trading in their district. Corregidors were also held to a review at the end of their term. At the conclusion of a corregidors term, a convention of residencia was held. This was an investigation into how the corregidors behavior was during their time ruling the district. The covention of residencia was a public hearing held for 30 days, and members of the colony where the corregidor resided could bring up complaints and speak out about the conduct of the corregidors.

Nominally under the viceroys, the long distances from the viceregal and even provincial capitals meant that most corregidores acted independently. Therefore, since their office held both police power (as the main local administrative institution) and judicial power (as the court of first instance) in rural areas, corregidores were very powerful persons. Because most of the corregidores in the Americas were not legally trained, they were assisted by lawyers who served as their asesores, or "advisers." If their district were large enough to require it, they were further assisted by subordinate delegates, called tenientes (lieutenant corregidores). In municipal areas with a cabildo, corregidores were to work with the council—for example, they recorded the annual election of alcaldes ordinarios and other council officers—but they could not hear cases in the first instance, which was the duty of the alcaldes ordinarios. In these cases, corregidores functioned as the first court of appeals, instead.

With the Bourbon Reforms of the late 18th century, most corregidores were replaced by the more powerful intendants.

== See also ==
- Corregimiento
- Alcalde
- Alcalde ordinario
- Sargento mayor
- Cabildo
- Regidor
- Síndico
- Ayuntamiento
- Teniente a guerra
- Santa Hermandad
