= Student Union of the Catalan Countries =

- Sindicat d'Estudiants dels Països Catalans
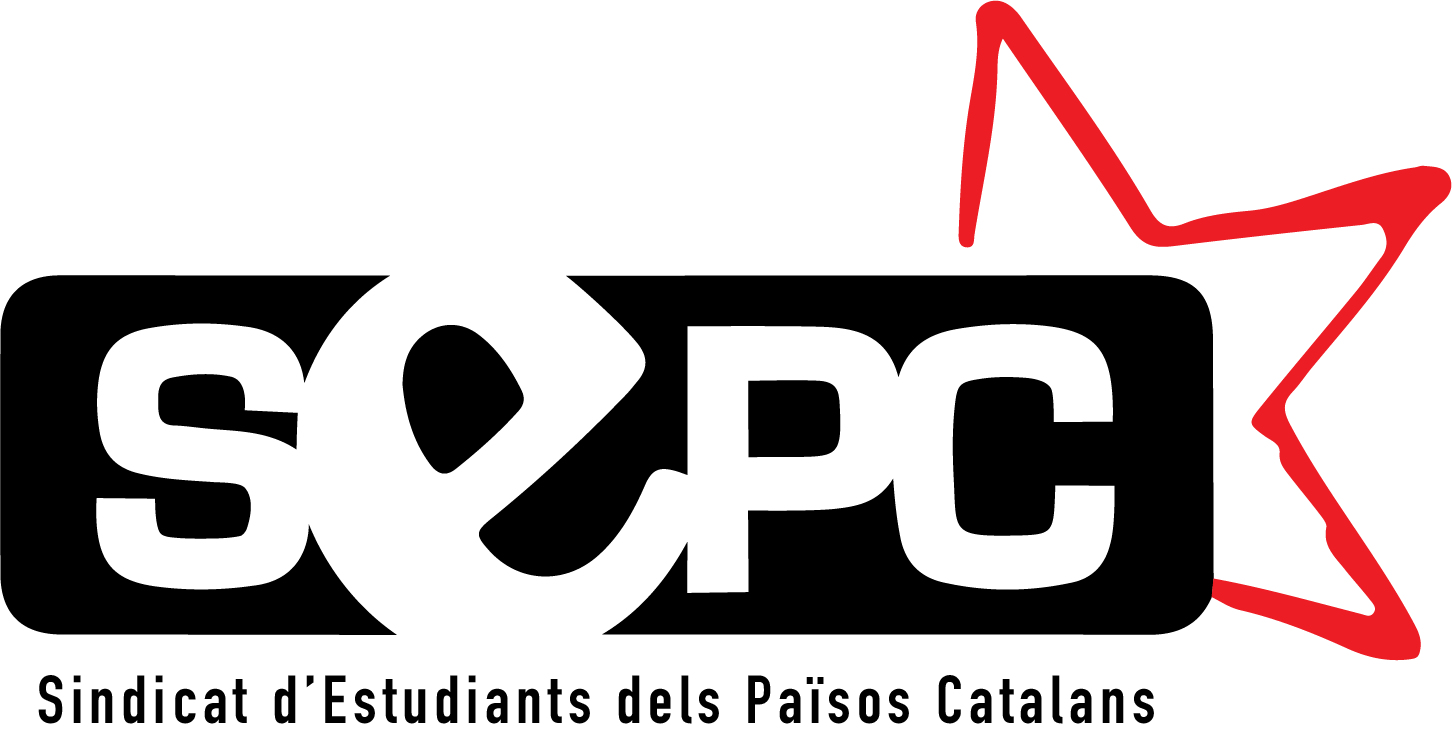
- Formation: May 2006; 19 years ago
- Merger of: Alternativa Estel and Coordinadora d'Estudiants dels Països Catalans
- Parent organization: Esquerra Independentista
- Website: https://www.sepc.cat/

The Student Union of the Catalan Countries (Catalan: Sindicat d'Estudiants dels Països Catalans, SEPC) is a student union based in the Catalan Countries. It was created in May 2006 as a merge of Alternativa Estel and Coordinadora d'Estudiants dels Països Catalans in the context of the Bologna Process. It initially had significant presence in the Valencian Country, Catalonia and Northern Catalonia. As a left-wing pro-independence organization, it's part of the Esquerra Independentista movement, thus usually linked to the Popular Unity Candidacy political party. Its main values are feminism, socialism, independentism, and it strongly advocates for Pan-Catalanism. It also stands against capitalism and LGBT-phobia. In fact, it pursues a new educational model as follows: secular, publicly funded, popular, Catalan-language, antipatriarchal, and good quality education. It organizes annual meetings such as the Trobada d’Estudiants dels Països Catalans (lit. 'Meeting of Students of the Catalan Countries') and the Congress of Catalan Philology Students.
