= Ayuntamiento =

General term for the council of a municipality, used in various countries

Ayuntamiento (Spanish pronunciation: [aʝuntaˈmjento]) (Note: In other languages of Spain: Catalan: ajuntament (IPA: [əʒuntəˈmen]).; Galician: concello (IPA: [konˈθeɟʊ]).; Basque: udaletxea (IPA: [udaletʃea]).) is the general term for the town council, or cabildo, of a municipality or, sometimes, as is often the case in Spain and Latin America, for the municipality itself. Ayuntamiento is mainly used in Spain; in Latin America alcaldía is also for municipal governing bodies, especially the executive ones, where the legislative body and the executive body are two separate entities. In Catalan-speaking parts of Spain, municipalities generally use the Catalan cognate, ajuntament, while Galician ones use the word concello, Astur-Leonese conceyu and Basque udaletxea. Since ayuntamiento is a metonym for the building in which the council meets, it also translates to "city/town hall" in English.

== Historically ==
With the eighteenth-century Bourbon Reforms in New Spain, which created intendancies and weakened the power of the viceroy, the ayuntamientos "became the institution representing the interests of the local and regional oligarchical groups then setting deep roots into their territories." The Spanish Constitution of 1812 called for the transformation of the ayuntamiento, previously dominated by elites, into a representative institution with elections. Article 310 called for the establishment of an ayuntamiento for all settlements with 1,000 inhabitants.

The term ayuntamiento was often preceded by the word excelentísimo ("most excellent"), when referring to the council. This phrase is often abbreviated "Exc.^{mo} Ay.^{to} ". Other names for ayuntamiento have been casa de cabildo, casa capitular, casa consistorial and casa del concejo.

== Local legislative body ==
In Latin America several terms exist for the legislative bodies of municipalities. The term consejo is used in Argentina, Chile, Colombia, Costa Rica, and Peru. In Mexico the term ayuntamiento is for the council (which refers to itself as the H. Ayuntamiento, or el Honorable Ayuntamiento). Puerto Rican municipalities have a legislatura municipal. In Peru the term ayuntamiento is never used; instead, it is municipalidad, consejo provincial or consejo distrital (district council). Executive functions in most of these countries is handled by an executive alcalde, the mayor (not to be confused with the historic alcalde, who was a magistrate).

== See also ==
- Ayuntamiento (Spain) for the specific institution of local government in Spain.
- Cabildo
- Comuna
- Encomienda
- Municipalidad
- Municipio
- Corregidor
- Alcalde
- Alcalde ordinario
- Sargento mayor
- Corregidor
- Cabildo (council)
- Síndico
- Corregimiento
- Teniente a guerra
