= Santa Hermandad =

Spanish law enforcement association

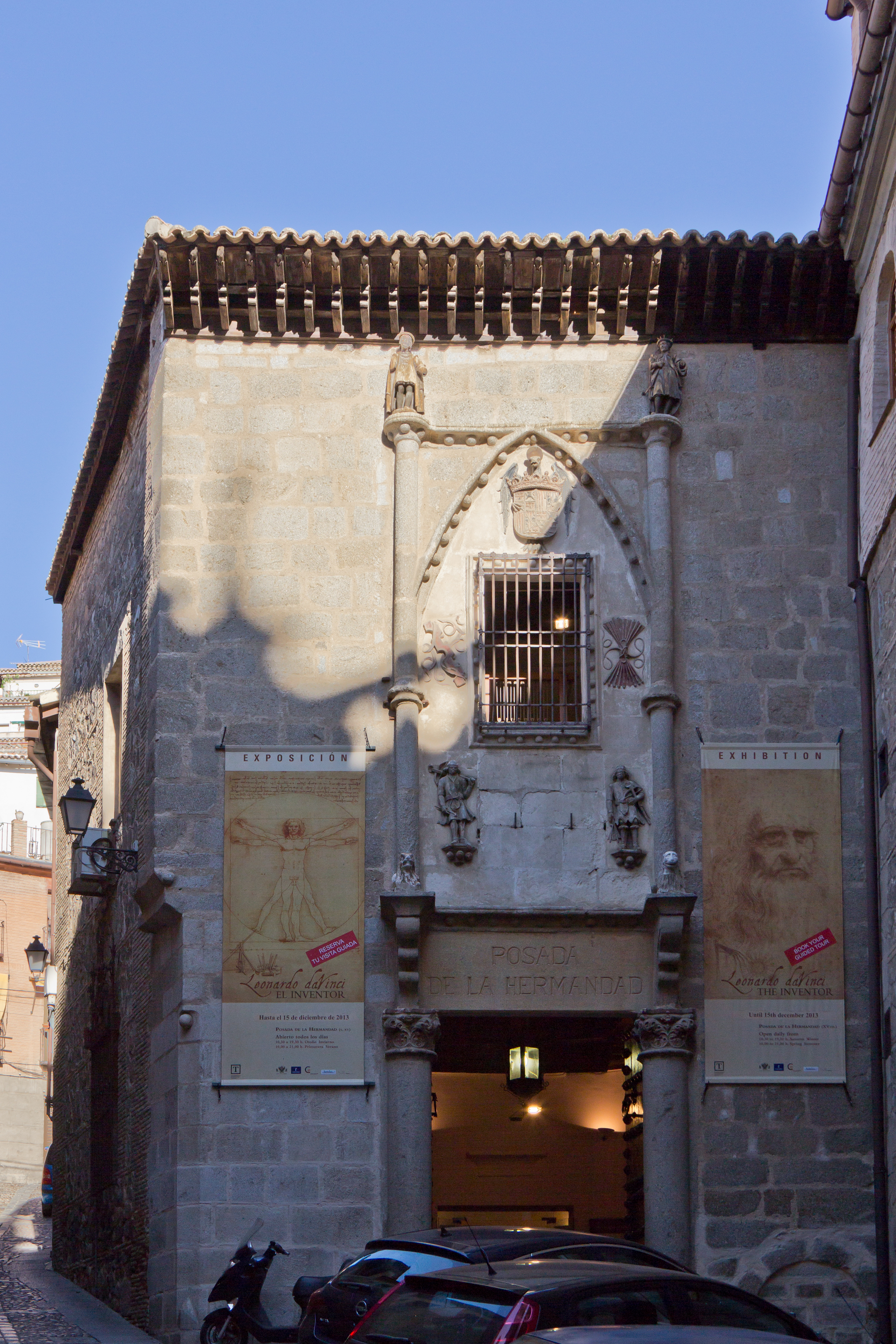
Posada de la Santa Hermandad, in Toledo, Spain, dating from the 15th century, now a historic site

Santa Hermandad (Spanish: [ˈsanta eɾmanˈdað], lit. 'holy brotherhood') was a type of military peacekeeping association of armed individuals, which became characteristic of municipal life in medieval Spain, especially in Castile. Modern hermandades in Spain, some of which evolved from medieval origins, are now for the most part religious confraternities retaining only a military structure and ethos.

== Background ==
As medieval Iberian kings of León, Castile, and Aragon were often unable to maintain public peace, protective municipal leagues began to emerge in the twelfth century against bandits and other rural criminals, as well as against the lawless nobility or mobilized to support a claimant to the crown. These organizations were individually temporary, but became a long-standing fixture of Spain. The first recorded case of the formation of an hermandad occurred when the towns and the peasantry of the north united to police the pilgrim road to Santiago de Compostela in Galicia, and to protect the pilgrims in the 12th century, a major source of regional income, against robber knights.

With the countryside virtually everywhere effectively in the hands of nobles, such brotherhoods throughout the High Middle Ages were frequently formed by leagues of towns to protect the roads connecting them. The hermandades were occasionally co-opted for dynastic purposes. They acted to some extent like the Vehmic courts of Germany. Among the most powerful was the league of northern Castilian and Basque ports, the Hermandad de las Marismas: Santander, Laredo, Castro Urdiales, Bermeo, Guetaria, San Sebastian, Fuenterrabia and Vitoria.

== Early formation ==
The hermandades initially began to form in Andalusia in 1265, in towns seeking to “defend their interests” from Islamic rebels who had been taking land and proclaiming their leader king. The groups may have been inspired by a previously existing Islamic police force called the shurṭa (Arabic: شرطة). The hermandades worked as local militias to protect the towns they came from. Hermandades also curbed the actions of bandits and other criminals, becoming a kind of police force. As the hermandad gained more legitimacy, they also gained more powers and responsibilities. Along with working as a police force and militia, they also collected taxes, acted as judges, and worked with the Cortes and corregidores on these and similar administrative problems. The hermandad judges relied on the backing of the corregidores for legitimacy. The hermandad were given jurisdiction over a wide range of crimes including: "crimes on roads or in unpopulated areas; rape of honest women; blasphemy; and the passing of false money."

As one of their first acts after the War of the Castilian Succession in 1475 to 1479, Ferdinand and Isabella "brought peace by the brilliant strategy of organizing rather than eliminating violence"; they established a centrally organized and efficient Holy Brotherhood (Spanish: Santa Hermandad) with themselves at its head. They adapted the existing form of the hermandad to the purpose of creating a general police force under the direction of officials appointed by themselves, and endowed with large powers of summary jurisdiction, even in capital cases. The rough and ready justice of the Santas Hermandades became famous for brutality. The original hermandades continued to serve as modest local police units until their final suppression in 1835.

== Relationship with rulers ==
The hermandades have had an inconsistent relationship with the ruling powers of Spain. They were sometimes used to undermine the authority of the king or his officials, and sometimes used to enforce it. Early in their formation, they tended to be temporary and to work in favor of royal authority in times of unrest. The king also took only a very minor role in the formation and regulation of the league.

Under the reign of King Alfonso in 1298, hermandades were used against the king because some of the towns felt that he had been abusing his power. While under the reign of Isabella I of Castile the hermandades were used to consolidate her authority and silence those who objected to her reign. By 1476, the administration of the "soon-to-be-kingdomwide league was incorporated into Isabella's government as the Santa Hermandad". At that point, the Hermandad had a charter, which stated that its duties were to "guard the sovereignty and service of the king and all the rights he ought to have and to guard our bodies and all that we have [...] and we will live in peace and quiet so that when our king comes of age he will find the land well ordered and richer and better settled for his service". At one point, corregidores were chastised by the townspeople because they were unable to stop the outrages and abuses of the Hermandad. Corregidores held posts within the Holy Brotherhood, but their power to control their chapter was limited.

== Relationship with towns and local communities ==
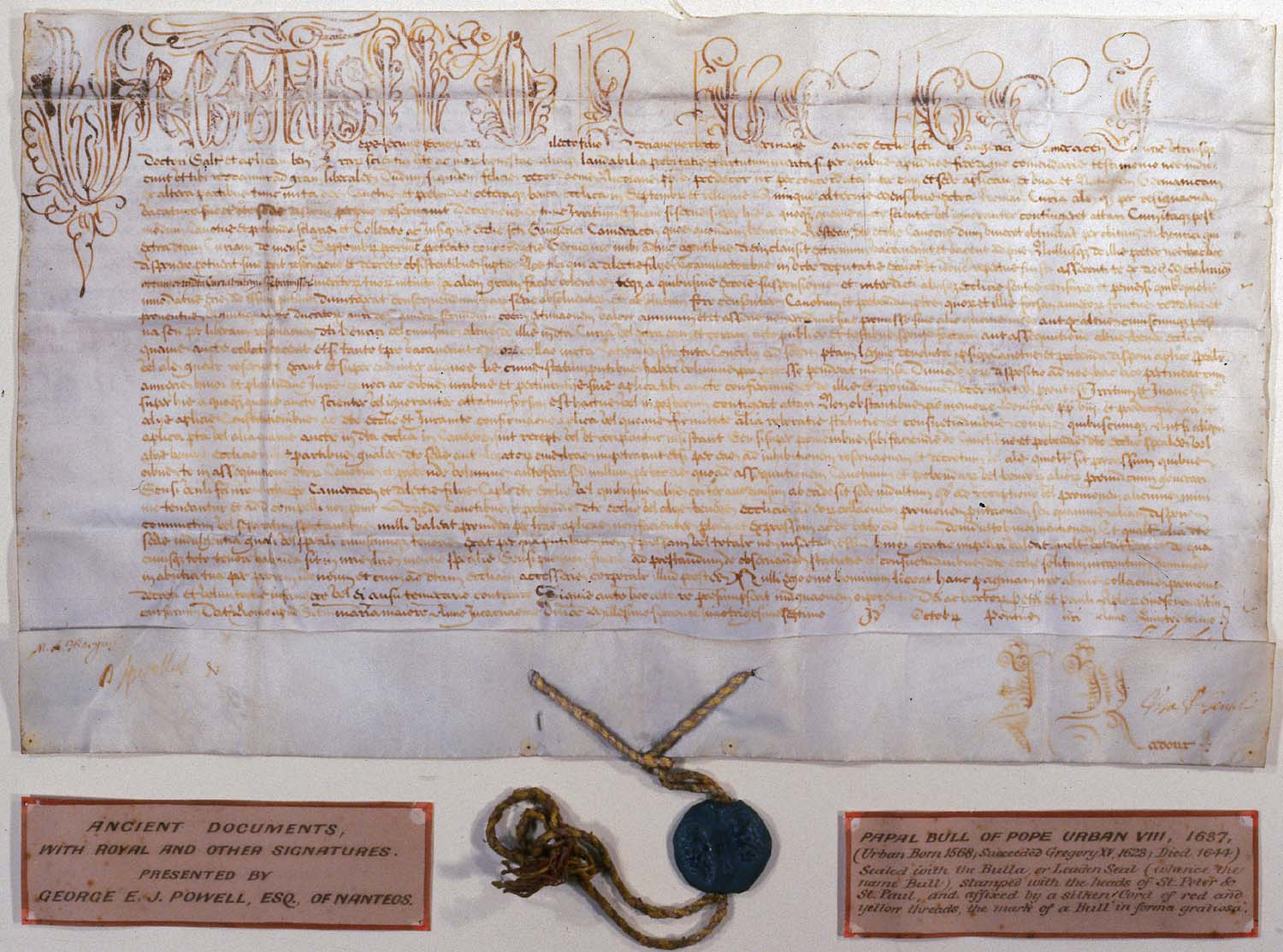
Papal bull of Pope Urban VIII, 1637, sealed with a leaden bulla.

Just as the Hermandad's relationship with the rulers and their fellow government employees was constantly changing, so was the opinion of them held by the towns they were supposed to be guarding. As mentioned before, the hermandad was initially created as local militias in times of need. When they became a more powerful and more permanent institution, there were definite instances of abuses of power. There were the previously mentioned instances of the Holy Brotherhood silencing those who objected to Isabella's reign. There were also reported instances of abuse by judges and archers, about whom the corregidores could do nothing. Guzmán de Alfarache (1599) is quoted in Lunenfeld's book. He quotes: "God free us from the transgressions of the three Holies – Inquisition, Brotherhood, and crusade bull." Complaints began to appear requesting that the powers of the Holy Brotherhood be reined in, and in 1485 police immunities were reduced and cases were brought up against the archers and judges.

Among local communities, the Santa Hermandad – also known colloquially as Las Mangas Verdes ('The Green Sleeves'), since their body armour covered all but the sleeves of their green uniforms—attained a reputation of being unreliable, corrupt and negligent of the interests of the townsfolk. Modern Spanish parlance has maintained the phrase a buenas horas, mangas verdes (roughly translated as 'right on time, green sleeves'; meaning 'better late than never'), referencing the Santa Hermandad's inability to react promptly to crimes in their districts.

== Finances ==
The Holy Brotherhood was supported by the collection of taxes and by a special ability to collect wartime funding, called servicios which were granted by a papal bull as a crusading indulgence. Because the hermandad was usually backed by the crown and nobles, they were able to collect money from resistant towns with force.

== Other uses ==
In the Netherlands, the Dutch expression hermandad remains a derogatory nickname for the police.

== See also ==
- Germania (guild)
