= Syndic =

Officer

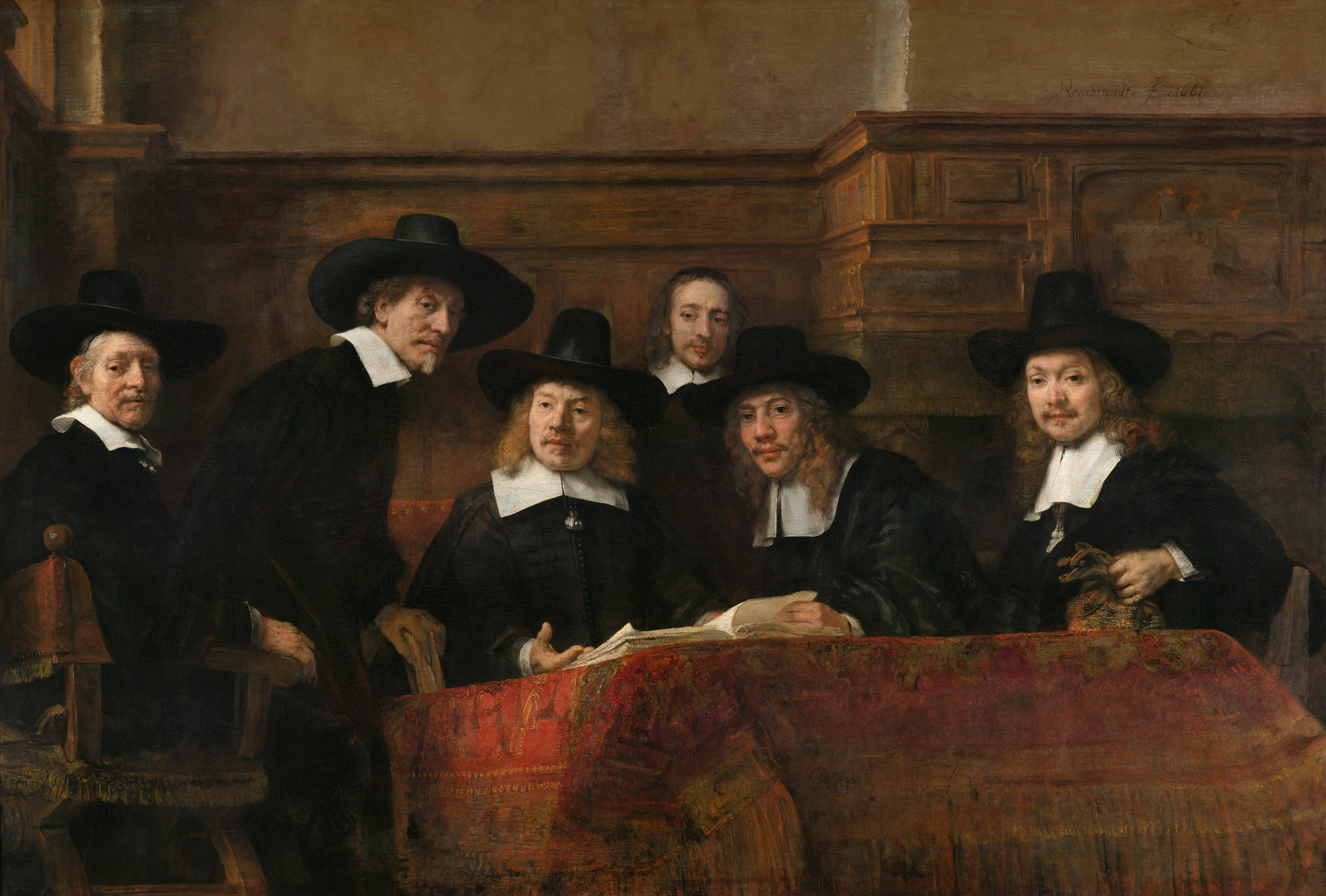
The Syndics of the Drapers' Guild by Rembrandt, 1662

Syndic (Latin: syndicus; Greek: σύνδικος, sýndikos, 'one who helps in a court of justice, an advocate, representative') is a term applied in certain countries to an officer of government with varying powers, and secondly to a representative or delegate of a university, institution or other corporation, entrusted with special functions or powers.

The meaning which underlies both applications is that of representative or delegate. Du Cange, after defining the word as defensor, patronus, advocatus, proceeds: "Syndici maxime appellantur Actores universitatum, collegiorum, societatum et aliorum corporum, per quos, tanquam in republica quod communiter agi fierive oportet, agitur et fit" ('Syndics: chiefly, the term for the members acting for universities, colleges, societies, and other bodies, through whom, as in a republic, what must be pursued or decreed in common, is pursued and decreed'), and gives several examples from the 13th century of the use of the term. The most familiar use of syndic in the first sense is that of the Italian sindaco and the French syndic who is the head of the administration of a comune, comparable to a mayor, and a government official, elected by the residents of the commune.

== Use in public administration and ombudsman bodies ==
=== Use in Italian and French linguistic areas ===
As indicated above, in Italy and some Italian- and French-speaking parts of Switzerland, the term sindaco or sindaca, or syndic, is equivalent to the English term mayor, in this case, the head of the administration of a comune.

=== Use in Catalan or Occitan linguistic areas ===
In areas where Catalan or Occitan are spoken, the term has been used since Medieval times. At present it is used in a variety of cases. The speaker of Andorra's parliament is known as the Síndic General (General Syndic) or Síndic Primer (First Syndic). Until the 1993 Constitution, the First Syndic was the effective head of government of Andorra. Similarly, the Síndic d'Aran (Occitan for Aran Syndic) is the head of the administration of the Aran Valley in Catalonia. In Catalonia, the Balearic Islands and the Valencian Community, the Síndic de Greuges or Síndica de Greuges ("advocate of grievances") is the ombudsman or ombudswoman, while the Síndic de Comptes or Síndica de Comptes is a board member of the Public Audit Office in each of the three regions. In the Valencian Parliament, the spokesperson of a parliamentary group is called a síndic or síndica, and together they form the Junta de Síndics (Board of Spokespersons), while in the Horta de València region (the area around the city of Valencia), a síndic is also a member of the Water Tribunal (Tribunal de les Aigües), the body in charge of regulating irrigation matters. In Alguer, Sardinia, the síndic is the equivalent of mayor.

=== Use in Mexican politics ===
A syndic is a trustee, the member of the municipal council responsible for monitoring and defending municipal interests. The syndic is in charge of legally representing the city council, procuring justice and the legality of the municipal administration. The syndic is also responsible for monitoring and managing the municipal finances. They must participate collegially with the mayor and the rest of the municipal council to make decisions on the political management of the municipality.

== Use in associations, guilds, and universities ==
In Europe in the Middle Ages and Renaissance, nearly all companies, guilds, and the University of Paris had representative bodies the members of which were termed syndici. Similarly in England, the Regent House of the University of Cambridge, which is the legislative body, delegates certain functions to special committees of its members, appointed from time to time by Grace (a proposal offered to the Regent House and confirmed by it); these committees are termed "syndicates" and are permanent or occasional, and the members are styled "the syndics" of the particular committee or of the institution which they administer; thus there are the syndics of the Fitzwilliam Museum, of the Cambridge University Press, of local examinations, etc.

== Use in labour organisations, -movements, and -politics ==
The term sindicat in Catalan is used in a broad sense to mean an association for the defence of the economic or social interests of its members, and therefore is often used generically to refer to labour organizations, as well as in the titles of certain labour organizations or federations (for instance, the Confederació Sindical de Treballadors de Catalunya, the Unió Sindical Obrera de Catalunya, the Coordinadora Obrera Sindical, etc.), student organizations (Sindicat d'Estudiants dels Països Catalans, Sindicat d'Estudiants del País Valencià, Sindicat Democràtic d'Estudiants de la Universitat de Barcelona, etc.) and journalist organizations (Sindicat de Periodistes de Catalunya / Sindicat de Professionals de la Comunicació, etc.), among others. The members or leaders of these organisations, however, are not called síndics.

=== Use in anarchist politics ===
Within syndicalist and anarcho-syndicalist organizations, a syndic is a member of an autonomous union, also called a syndicate, which make up the basic organizational unit of society. As these models are organized along principles of non-hierarchy and direct democracy, the title syndic is applied to all in the syndicate and does not imply a position of power over any other member, unlike older usages of the title.

== Use in property management ==
In some countries, notably France, Belgium and Brazil, a syndic de copropriété (Dutch syndicus, Portuguese síndico) is an important figure in millions of lives, elected by owners of condominiums to represent property owners in the management of the co-owned building or property. While the profession is regulated, fees are not, and in France complaints of overcharging are frequent. The Association des responsables de copropriété (ARC) reported that fees rose by 4% in 2016, though the rate of inflation was only 0.2%, and since 2014 three of the largest syndics in Paris have raised their fees by amounts ranging from 26% to 37%.

== Use in religious bodies ==
One special use of the term applies to the Franciscan order of priests and brothers. The Order of Friars Minor (OFM), as opposed to the Order of Friars Minor Conventual (OFM Conv.), is forbidden by its constitutions from owning property, as part of its commitment to communal poverty. Various arrangements therefore exist whereby churches and houses of the order are owned by the Holy See itself, or the local diocese or, sometimes, by a "syndic", an independent layman who is the actual owner of the land but who loans it to the friars.

== See also ==
- Bankruptcy
- Syndicalism
- Trustee
- The Dispossessed, a novel with syndics
- Corporate lawyers, since German term Syndikusanwalt is normally used as concept of in house counsel
