= Corregimiento =

Spanish term for country administrative subdivisions

Corregimiento (Spanish: [korexiˈmjento]; Catalan: Corregiment, IPA: [kurəʒiˈmen]) is a Spanish term used for country subdivisions for royal administrative purposes, ensuring districts were under crown control as opposed to local elites. A corregimiento was usually headed by a corregidor. The name comes from the word corregir, meaning "to correct".

== Historical corregimientos ==
Corregimientos were found historically in the Kingdom of Castile, the Kingdom of Aragon, and the Spanish West Indies.

=== Castile ===
In Old Castile corregimientos existed since the 13th century and were the administrative divisions of the Junta General de las Siete Merindades de Castilla Vieja. After the Nueva Planta decrees under the rule of Philip V—the first Bourbon king of Spain, the corregidor was replaced by an intendant. Corregimientos in Castile existed until 1835, the year in which the municipal administration was reorganized under Queen Isabel II.

=== Crown of Aragon ===
In the territories of Aragon, Catalonia, and the Land of Valencia formerly under the ancient Crown of Aragon, the corregimiento (Catalan: Corregiment) replaced the former administrative divisions following the Nueva Planta decrees. However, corregimientos disappeared in this area during the French occupation, being replaced by the territorial divisions of the French military rulers. Corregimientos were finally superseded following the territorial division of Spain in 1833.

=== Captaincy General of Guatemala ===
The corregimiento of Totonicapán and Huehuetenango was a division under the Audiencia of Guatemala from 1547 to 1678, when it was reorganised as an alcaldía mayor.

== Present-day corregimientos ==
=== Colombia ===
The corregimientos of Colombia are smaller units than the historical ones. The word is used for the population centers that do not reach the level of municipality. They are thus under a municipality or a department.

=== Panama ===
The corregimientos of Panama are district subdivisions. They are led by the Representante de Corregimiento, also known as a corregidor.

== See also ==
- Corregidor
- Santa Hermandad
- Spanish Empire
