= Provincial deputation in Spanish America =

Provincial Deputation
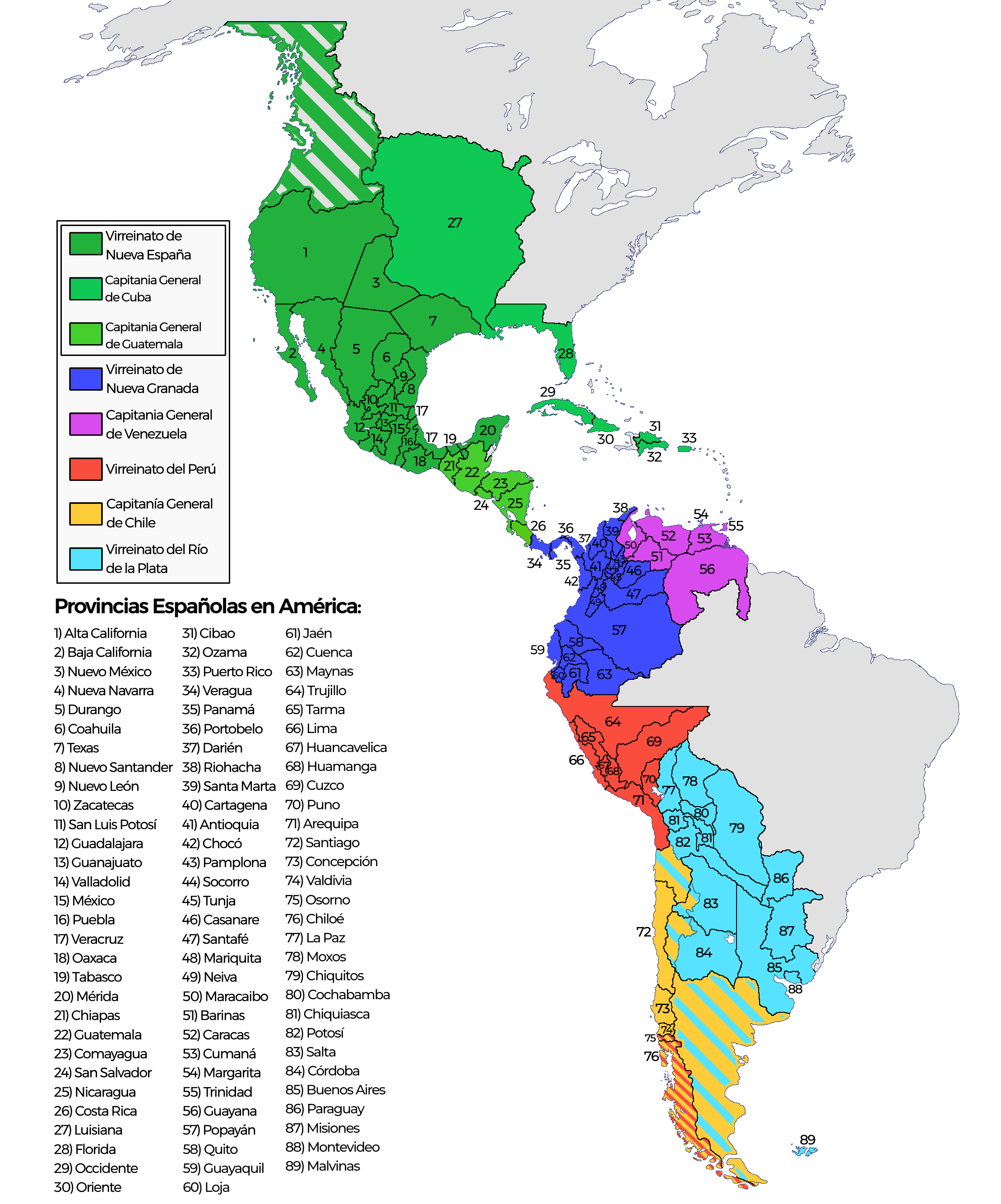
- American Provinces of Spain in 1800
- Number: 20 (1812)

The Diputación Provincial, Spanish for Provincial Deputation, was a type of institution created by the Spanish Constitution of 1812 to provide a representation of the territorial divisions of both Spain and the Hispanic American territories of the Spanish Empire, during the term of the Cortes of Cádiz. The Cortes created new structures for home rule, the provincial deputations and the constitutional ayuntamientos (local governments). The provincial deputations were a way by which regions ruled by juntas and areas in rebellion in the Americas could keep local control, but maintain their ties to the larger Spanish Empire.

The term "province" in America had an imprecise meaning. The American deputies with the word referred to the small province (Partido), while the European deputies did with great province (kingdom, viceroyalty). The Spanish courts identified province with Intendancy. Previously, the decree of the Supreme Central Junta defined the American territories not as colonies, but as an integral part of the Hispanic Monarchy.

With the constitution and the creation of provincial deputations, the Cortes abolished the viceroyalties; the provincial deputations dealt directly with the government in Spain. The province was governed by a Jefe Político (political chief) appointed by the central government, and a seven-member Diputación Provincial (provincial council), popularly elected. With the absolutist restoration in Spain in 1814 and 1823, the provinces as political entities disappeared and their territories were again included in the restored viceroyalties. However, by 1825 all but Cuba, Puerto Rico, and the Philippines remained of The Indies, following the Spanish American wars of independence.

== Viceroyalties ==
The Indies was the traditional name for the overseas territories of the Spanish Empire in the Americas and the Philippines, incorporated into the Crown of Castile. Under the Bourbon dynasty, the Monarchy — until then a plural union of separate kingdoms — was transformed into a single Kingdom in pursuit of better administrative and economic organization, becoming known as the Kingdom of Spain and the Indies. Under the reforms of Charles III, Bourbon Reforms, the Viceroyalty of Peru was divided into three viceroyalties, and all Spanish territories were in turn subdivided into intendancies (1803). The viceroy was the king's alter ego.

Viceroyalty	1492–1536	1535–1717	1717–1723	1723–1739	1739–1824
Viceroyalty	Viceroyalty of the Indies, Islands and Tierra Firme (1492–1536)	Viceroyalty of New Spain (1535–)	Viceroyalty of New Spain (Continued)	Viceroyalty of New Spain (Continued)	Viceroyalty of New Spain (–1821)
Viceroyalty	Viceroyalty of the Indies, Islands and Tierra Firme (1492–1536)	Viceroyalty of Peru (1542–)	Viceroyalty of New Granada (1717–1723)	Viceroyalty of Peru (Continued)	Viceroyalty of New Granada (1739–1812; 1816–1822)
Viceroyalty	Viceroyalty of the Indies, Islands and Tierra Firme (1492–1536)	Viceroyalty of Peru (1542–)	Viceroyalty of Peru (Continued)	Viceroyalty of Peru (Continued)	Viceroyalty of Peru (–1824)
Viceroyalty	Viceroyalty of the Indies, Islands and Tierra Firme (1492–1536)	Viceroyalty of Peru (1542–)	Viceroyalty of Peru (Continued)	Viceroyalty of Peru (Continued)	Viceroyalty of the Río de la Plata (1776–1811)

== American Provinces of Spain under the Spanish Constitution of 1812 ==
A commission of American deputies subsequently presented its opinion on May 1, 1812, to have the number of American provinces described in the Spanish Constitution of 1812 raised to twenty. This was approved by the Cortes. Later, the American deputies demanded an even greater subdivision, and after the installation of the Trienio Liberal in 1820, the Spanish Cortes agreed in their decree of May 9, 1821, to convert all intendancies into provinces. However, these provinces were merely nominal, since many of the territories were part of the new independent Spanish-American states. In any case, all the provinces were directly dependent on Madrid, autonomous and without any institutional relationship among themselves. The province was subdivided into partidos, governed by Jefes Políticos Subalternos (sub-level political chief).

American Provinces of Spain under the Spanish Constitution of 1812
Viceroyalty or Captaincy General	Province	Jurisdictional territories	Capital
Viceroyalty of New Spain	Province of New Spain	Intendancy of Mexico; Intendancy of Oaxaca; Intendancy of Puebla de los Ángeles; Intendancy of Valladolid	Mexico City
Viceroyalty of New Spain	General Command of the Internal Provinces of the East	Nueva Extremadura; New Kingdom of León; Nuevo Santander; Texas	Monterrey
Viceroyalty of New Spain	General Command of the Internal Provinces of the West	Alta California; Baja California; New Navarre; Nueva Vizcaya; Santa Fe de Nuevo México	Durango
Viceroyalty of New Spain	San Luis Potosí	Intendancy of San Luis Potosí; Intendancy of Guanajuato	Guanajuato
Viceroyalty of New Spain	Intendancy of Guadalajara	Intendancy of Guadalajara; Intendancy of Zacatecas	Guadalajara
Viceroyalty of New Spain	Captaincy General of Yucatán		Mérida
Captaincy General of Guatemala	Province of Guatemala	Intendancy of Guatemala; Intendancy of San Salvador; Intendancy of Comayagua; Intendancy of Ciudad Real de Chiapas	Guatemala
Captaincy General of Guatemala	Province of Nicaragua and Costa Rica	Province of Nicaragua; Province of Costa Rica	León
Captaincy General of Cuba	Province of La Habana	Western Department; West Florida; East Florida	La Habana
Captaincy General of Cuba	Province of Santiago de Cuba	Eastern Department	Santiago de Cuba
Captaincy General of Cuba	Captaincy General of Puerto Rico	Puerto Rico; Spanish Virgin Islands	San Juan
Captaincy General of Cuba	Captaincy General of Santo Domingo	Santo Domingo	Santo Domingo
Captaincy General of Venezuela	Captaincy General of Venezuela	Barinas Province; Guayana Province; Maracaibo Province; Margarita Province; Intendancy of Caracas	Caracas
Viceroyalty of New Granada	New Kingdom of Granada	Antioquia Province; Cartagena Province; Chocó Province; Pamplona Province; Pasto Province; Popayán Province; Santa Marta Province; Santafé de Bogotá Province; Tunja Province	Santa Fe
Viceroyalty of New Granada	Province of Quito	Governorate of Quito; Governorate of Guayaquil	Quito
Viceroyalty of Peru	Province of Lima	Intendancy of Huamanga; Intendancy of Huancavelica; Intendancy of Lima; Intendancy of Tarma; Intendancy of Trujillo; General Command of Maynas	Lima
Viceroyalty of Peru	Province of Cuzco	Intendancy of Arequipa; Intendancy of Cuzco; Intendancy of Puno	Cuzco
Captaincy General of Chile	Province of Chile	Intendancy of Concepción; Intendancy of Coquimbo; Intendancy of Chiloé; Intendancy of Santiago	Santiago
Viceroyalty of the Río de la Plata	Province of Río de la Plata	Intendancy of Buenos Aires; Intendancy of Córdoba del Tucumán; Intendancy of Salta del Tucumán; Intendancy of Paraguay; Governate of the Misiones Guaraníes	Buenos Aires
Viceroyalty of the Río de la Plata	Charcas (Upper Peru)	Intendancy of Cochabamba; Intendancy of Chuquisaca; Intendancy of La Paz; Intendancy of Potosí; Intendancy of Puno; Political and military government of Moxos; Political and military government of Chiquitos	Chuquisaca
Captaincy General of the Philippines	Province of Philippines	Provinces of Manila, Cebu, Nueva Cáceres and Nueva Segovia	Manila

== American Provinces of 1821 ==
The 21 overseas provinces of 1812 were restored during the Trienio Liberal in 1820. In addition, the decree of 6 November 1820 created the province of Valladolid de Michoacán, incorporating the intendancy of Guanajuato, while the intendancy of Zacatecas became part of the intendancy of San Luis Potosí.

Later, the American deputies demanded an even greater subdivision, and the Spanish Cortes agreed, in their decree of 9 May 1821, to convert into provinces all the former Intendancies established under the General Ordinance of Intendants of the Indies of 1803 (plus the Intendancies of Puerto Príncipe and Saltillo, established in 1813, and the Intendancy of Guayaquil, established in 1819), thereby setting up a total of 52 overseas provinces. All the provinces were directly dependent on Madrid, autonomous, and with no institutional relationship among themselves.

American Provinces of Spain of 1821 according to the Ordinance of Intendants of the Indies (1803)
Viceroyalty or Kingdom	Intendancy	Provinces, corregimientos or governorates
Viceroyalty of New Spain	Mexico	With the corregimiento of Querétaro
Viceroyalty of New Spain	Puebla de los Ángeles	With the corregimiento of Tlaxcala
Viceroyalty of New Spain	Veracruz	
Viceroyalty of New Spain	Antequera de Oaxaca	
Viceroyalty of New Spain	Valladolid de Michoacán	
Viceroyalty of New Spain	Santa Fe de Guanajuato	
Viceroyalty of New Spain	San Luis de Potosí	
Viceroyalty of New Spain	Guadalajara de Nueva Galicia	
Viceroyalty of New Spain	Zacatecas	
Viceroyalty of New Spain	Mérida de Yucatán	Provinces of Yucatán and Tabasco
Viceroyalty of New Spain	Durango	Province of Nueva Vizcaya and government of New Mexico
Viceroyalty of New Spain	Arizpe	Provinces of Sonora y Sinaloa, governments of Alta California and Baja California
Viceroyalty of New Spain	Saltillo (1813)	Provinces of Nuevo León, Coahuila, Nuevo Santander and Texas
Captaincy General of Cuba	Santo Domingo	
Captaincy General of Cuba	Puerto Rico	Puerto Rico, Spanish Virgin Islands
Captaincy General of Cuba	Havana	Western Cuba (included Spanish Florida, ceded in 1820)
Captaincy General of Cuba	Santiago de Cuba	Eastern Cuba (established by order of the Cortes, 27 February 1812)
Captaincy General of Cuba	Puerto Príncipe	Central Cuba (established by order of the Cortes, 27 February 1812)
Captaincy General of Guatemala	Guatemala	
Captaincy General of Guatemala	San Salvador	
Captaincy General of Guatemala	Comayagua	
Captaincy General of Guatemala	Nicaragua	Provinces of León de Nicaragua and Cartago de Costa Rica
Captaincy General of Guatemala	Chiapa	
Captaincy General of Venezuela	Caracas	Provinces of Caracas and Barinas
Captaincy General of Venezuela	Maracaibo (1815)	Provinces of Maracaibo and Coro (created by Royal Decree of 19 December 1815)
Captaincy General of Venezuela	Guayana	Provinces of Guayana, Cumaná and Margarita
Viceroyalty of New Granada	Santafé de Bogotá	Governments of Santafé, Tunja, Neiva, Pamplona, Socorro, Antioquia and Pasto
Viceroyalty of New Granada	Popayán	Governments of Chocó and Popayán
Viceroyalty of New Granada	Cartagena de Indias	Governments of Cartagena, Santa Marta and Riohacha
Viceroyalty of New Granada	Panama (1822)	Governments of Panama and Veraguas (intendancy created by Decree XXXIX of the Cortes, 19 May 1822)
Viceroyalty of New Granada	Quito	Government of Quito
Viceroyalty of New Granada	Guayaquil	Government of Guayaquil (intendancy created by Royal Order of Ferdinand VII, 29 June 1819)
Viceroyalty of New Granada	Cuenca	Government of Cuenca
Viceroyalty of Peru	Lima	Lima, with the Governments of Chiloé, Valdivia and Osorno
Viceroyalty of Peru	Trujillo	With the Comandancia of Maynas
Viceroyalty of Peru	Arequipa	
Viceroyalty of Peru	Huamanga	
Viceroyalty of Peru	Tarma	
Viceroyalty of Peru	Huancavelica	
Viceroyalty of Peru	Cuzco	
Viceroyalty of Peru	Puno	
Captaincy General of Chile	Santiago	
Captaincy General of Chile	Concepción	
Viceroyalty of the Río de la Plata	Buenos Aires	With the governments of Montevideo and Guaraní Missions
Viceroyalty of the Río de la Plata	Asunción del Paraguay	
Viceroyalty of the Río de la Plata	Córdoba del Tucumán	
Viceroyalty of the Río de la Plata	Salta	
Viceroyalty of the Río de la Plata	Cochabamba	With Santa Cruz de la Sierra and the governments of Moxos and Chiquitos
Viceroyalty of the Río de la Plata	La Paz	
Viceroyalty of the Río de la Plata	Charcas (Chuquisaca)	
Viceroyalty of the Río de la Plata	Potosí	
Captaincy General of the Philippines	Manila	Provinces of Manila, Cebu, Nueva Cáceres and Nueva Segovia

== See also ==
- Cortes of Cádiz
- Spanish Constitution of 1812
- National sovereignty
- Liberalism

== Bibliography ==
- Berry, Charles R. "The Election of Mexican Deputies to the Spanish Cortes, 1810-1822", in Mexico and the Spanish Cortes, 1810-1822, Nettie Lee Benson, ed. University of Texas Press 1971, pp. 10-42.
- Rieu-Millan, Marie Laure. Los diputatods americanos en las Cortes de Cádiz. Madrid: Consejo Superior de Investigaciones Científicas, 1990.
- Municipios y provincias: historia de la organización territorial española
