= Cuzco Rebellion of 1814 =

1814–1815 rebellion in Peru

- Part of the Peruvian War of Independence
Date	3 August 1814 – 25 March 1815
Location	Intendancies of Cuzco, Huamanga, Arequipa, Puno, and La Paz, Spanish Empire
Result	Royalist victory

Belligerents
(Note: "They designed a flag with the colors white and blue, distinctive of the habit of the Virgen de las Mercedes, whom they designated patron of their arms.") Government Junta of Cuzco	Spain; (Spain) Viceroyalty of Peru

Commanders and leaders
Angulo brothers: José (executed) (Note: "The expedition of which he was a part came to an unfortunate end in Umachiri, but when the battle began, the inspiration of the poet made him raise in his ranks an austere and decisive insignia: the black flag of the war to the death." "[...] put in front of him the bloody insignia of a black flag, as a sign of cruelty that we would be denied quarter; Instead of cowing my troops, he inspired in them only ardor and the desire to die with honor.") Vicente (executed); Mariano (executed); Juan (POW) Other: Mateo Pumacahua (executed); Manuel Hurtado †; José Gabriel Béjar (executed); Mariano Melgar (executed); Juan Manuel Pinelo; José María Corbacho; José Pérez (surrendered); Ildefonso de las Muñecas	(Spain) José Fernando de Abascal (Spain) Juan Ramírez Orozco (Spain) Francisco Picoaga (Spain) José Gabriel Moscoso (Spain) Manuel Pardo (Spain) Gregorio de Hoyos

Strength
12,000–36,000 men 2,000 horses 600–800 rifles 40 cannons Huamanga Expedition: 5,000 men 5,000 horses 800 armed troops 18 cannons 2 culverins La Paz Expedition: 2,000 men with traditional arms 500 men with rifles 8 cannons	Ramírez's division: 1,200 soldiers 40 horses 6 pieces of artillery

The Cuzco Rebellion of 1814 was an episode of the Peruvian War of Independence led by the Angulo brothers and Mateo Pumacahua that took place in much of the province of Cuzco, including Huamanga, Arequipa and Puno, as well as part of the province of Charcas. The uprising involved the proclamation of the autonomy and self-government of Cuzco from the Viceroyalty of Peru, governed by Viceroy José Fernando de Abascal y Sousa. The junta was modelled and intended to follow the steps of the Junta of Buenos Aires.

The origin of the rebellion was the claim held by members of the city council of Cuzco to establish a provincial council, also autonomous from the viceregal government of Lima, according to what the Cortes of Cádiz of 1812 anticipated, but that the court of the Real Audiencia of Cuzco resolved to the contrary, ordering the arrest of the claimants. The Angulo brothers, members of the Cabildo of Cuzco, fled on August 3, 1814, and found support in chief Mateo Pumacahua to form a Cuzco Government Junta. Under the command of José Angulo, three expeditions were organized: the first took the city of La Paz; the second, directed to the north, assaulted the city of Huamanga; the third, under Pumacahua's command, occupied Arequipa.

The conflict began on August 3, 1814, with an uprising in Cuzco, with subsequent battles in the viceroyalty's southern areas, and finally ending with the liberation of the city on March 25, 1815, by the royalist forces of the Viceroyalty of Peru.

== Background ==
In the middle of 1813, when the advance of the Argentine patriotic auxiliary army led by Manuel Belgrano spread, a significant number of notables from Cuzco, with the support of officers and soldiers of the Royalist Army coming from the capitulation that followed the Spanish defeat in the battle of Salta, decided to advance in the self-government granted by the Spanish Constitution of 1812 against absolutism. After triumphing in Salta, Belgrano had released the defeated royalist soldiers in exchange for the promise not to take up arms again against the patriots, a promise from which they were released by the Viceroy and the Archbishop of Charcas.

The rebellion had its origins in the political confrontation between the constitutional cabildo, (favorable to Cuzco's autonomy) and the Real Audiencia of Cuzco (favorable to the Viceroy of Lima). In this confrontation, the leadership of the brothers José, Vicente Angulo and Mariano Angulo emerged, accompanied by José Gabriel Béjar, Juan Carbajal and Pedro Tudela. José and Vicente Angulo were officers of the royalist army in Abancay, then a party of the Cuzco administration.

The first revolutionary act was planned for October 9, 1813, with the support of the leaders of the royalist garrison of Cuzco, Matías Lobatón and Marcelino Vargas. The plotters demanded the president of the Cuzco Court, Martín de la Concha y Jara, the application of the liberal constitution. The insurgent plan was revealed by one of the signatories of the revolutionary pact, Mariano Zubizarreta. The Béjar, Carbajal, the Angulo brothers, and others were arrested before the revolution began by order of the Viceroy. The conspirators who were not imprisoned planned a second attempt on November 5, 1813, but another conspirator named Mariano Arriaga, was the cause of another failure. However, a group of patriots did not give up their efforts and tried to take the Plaza de Armas of Cuzco, facing troops loyal to Viceroy Abascal. Due to the confrontation three, young people died.

== Angulo brothers ==
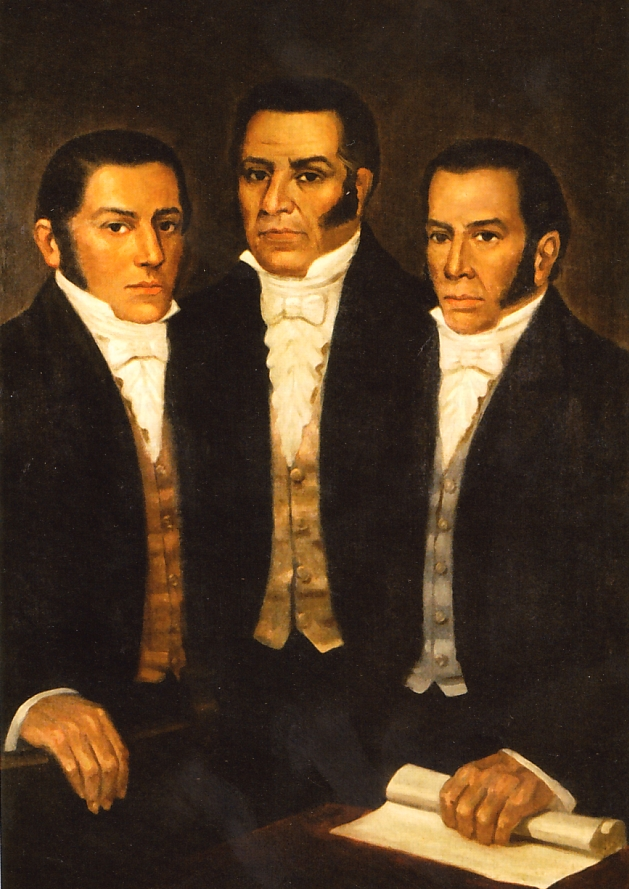
Painting of José, Vicente and Mariano Angulo.

The Angulo brothers were four brothers from Apurímac, a territory that then belonged to Cuzco, which is why they are also considered Cusqueños. They were the legitimate children of Francisco Angulo and Melchora Torres, with the exact date of birth of each one being unknown.

=== José Angulo ===
Angulo started as a miner in Tarapacá. He married María Asencia Tapia de Mendoza on January 7, 1790 and chose to dedicate himself to agricultural work in the vicinity of Cuzco. In 1798, he applied his wife's dowry to acquire the Chitabamba cane field located in the Abancay district, but as he did not have the financial resources to make it yield profitably, he transferred it to his brother Vicente on September 30, 1808. Concerned about the exploitation of the indigenous people at the hands of the Spanish, and by the ideological currents linked to the May Revolution, he frequented the meetings that the patriots from Cuzco organized in the city. He was the head of the 1814 revolution.

=== Vicente Angulo ===
Dedicated to agricultural work, his brother José transferred his Chitabamba cane field to him in 1808, and to develop his crops, he offered it as a guarantee for the loans he contracted with the Convent of Santo Domingo on December 1, 1809, and the Convent of Santa Catalina de Siena del Cusco on June 5, 1811, for 2,000 and 6,000 pesos respectively. At that time he joined the Royalist Army to fight against the Argentine forces that invaded Upper Peru. He was promoted to lieutenant, being commissioned to guard three prisoners in Lima in 1812. Back in Cuzco on April 24, 1813, he actively participated in the revolutionary meetings, along with his brothers, José and Mariano.

=== Mariano Angulo ===
He started in public administration as a deputy delegate of the Partido of Abancay, one of the political subdivisions of the Intendancy of Cuzco. He then dedicated himself to commerce in Cuzco proper and took charge of the Simataucca estate, in Chinchero, which Petronila Durán de Quintanilla ceded to him. When the 1814 revolution broke out, he took over the command of the Cuzco headquarters, with the rank of colonel.

=== Juan Angulo ===
He studied at the Saint Anthony the Abbot Seminary in Cuzco, and after receiving the diaconate on September 18, 1802, he served in the parishes of Belén and Santiago, and was bursar in the doctrines of Alca and Quiaca. Consecrated as a priest around 1808, he was assigned to the parish of Pampamarca, whose temple he decorated and roofed, out of his own pocket. He was in the parish of Lares, when the revolution broke out in 1814. Aware of this event, he immediately moved to Cuzco to accompany his brothers.

== Establishment of a Junta in Cuzco ==
Cuzco Government Junta
- Junta de gobierno del Cuzco
- A two-tone flag similar to that of Argentina, was used by the Junta. It was based on the Virgen de las Mercedes' cloak.
- Dates active: 1814–1815
- Wars: Cuzco Rebellion

The leaders of the rebellion were under arrest in the chapel of San Ignacio located on the southern front of the Plaza de Armas. However, due to their ascendancy over the Cuzco garrison, they held political meetings from there. By August 1814, the constitutionalist partisans, called "criollos", politically controlled the city of Cuzco, but the followers of the Angulo, under the demand for the application of the Cadiz Constitution, intended to follow the autonomous actions of Buenos Aires. A board would be formed that would be made up of three notables who were Mateo Pumacahua, Domingo Luis Astete and Juan Tomás Moscoso and that, like other American autonomist boards, recognized the authority of the Spanish courts and the monarch Ferdinand VII. Pumacahua initially promised 4,000 men, but his call was so popular that more than 20,000 Indians joined his cause.

In the early hours of Tuesday, August 3, 1814, a bloodless coup took place in which the Cuzco garrison massively joined the rebels. The president of the audiencia and regent Manuel Pardo Ribadeneira were deposed. José Angulo assumed the position of maximum leader of the revolution, being the president of the self-government board and captain general "of the country's arms of the provinces of Cuzco, Puno, Guamanga and La Paz".

As José Tamayo Herrera (1984) has investigated, the military chiefs and the authorities loyal to the viceroy were confined to the headquarters located in the former Jesuit convent and later, in republican times, the headquarters of the San Antonio Abad National University, being included within the authority of the revolutionary chiefs, the entire territory of the Cuzco Intendancy and, in military matters, five quartered companies, under the command of Commander Andrés Rendón; a regiment of dragoons under the command of Commander Martín Gabino Concha, and groups of troops from the Royal Regiment of Lima. Brigadier Pumacahua, the highest-ranking patriot officer, assumed the revolutionary military leadership. A local government board was formed made up of Pumacahua, royalist colonel Domingo Luis Astete and lieutenant colonel Juan Tomás Moscoso.

The insurrection was previously agreed to break out simultaneously in Cuzco, Lima and in the Royal Army of Upper Peru. In Lima, José Matías Vázquez de Acuña, Count de la Vega del Ren, remained indecisive and failed in the attempt, while in Joaquín de la Pezuela's camp in Tupiza, Colonel Saturnino Castro, one of the sworn in Salta, moved to the cantonment of the "El General" Battalion from Cuzco in Moraya. He had the idea of revolting them on September 1, but he did not get adhesions, he was discovered and shot.

The Cuzco proclamation is dated August 3, 1814 and the project of the Cuzco governing board was to support the autonomous actions of Buenos Aires. On September 8, 1814, in the cathedral of Cuzco, with the blessing of Bishop José Pérez y Armendáriz, solemn worship was paid to a new flag, with transverse blue and white stripes. On its date, September 27, the Virgen de las Mercedes was taken in procession from Cuzco, along with a flag with blue and white colors, colors of the followers of the country's system. On September 17, José Angulo, after seeing his constitutional claims rejected by Viceroy Abascal, who threatened to use force, warned him of the support that the patriot cause would have and of the futility of confronting it with arms:

See viceroy (...) if (...) according to your public faith, you put yourselves in the sad situation of treating us as enemies, then you and your accomplices will experience our just rigor. Yes, dispatch troops to the pasture of our revenge, we warned you that they will not exceed four thousand hardened brave soldiers (...), who will counteract with ten thousand who come.

— Reply from José Angulo to Viceroy José Fernando de Abascal y Sousa

On December 30, 1814, Viceroy Abascal annulled the Constitution of Cádiz in Peru, in application of the order received from the Iberian Peninsula from Ferdinand VII, who had restored absolutism in Spain.

== Rebellion expands ==
The new government of Captain General Angulo appointed plenipotentiaries before the independent government of the United Provinces of the Río de la Plata, received congratulations from General Belgrano and proceeded to form their institutions. He also sent three military expeditions to Huamanga, Arequipa, and Puno and La Paz.

The Viceregal authority of Lima, still weakened by the war against the revolution of José Gabriel Condorcanqui, only took energetic measures in October.

=== Puno and Upper Peru Division ===
The division headed for Puno was commanded by Juan Manuel Pinelo from Ica (one of the sworn in Salta), seconded by the parish priest of the Cusco cathedral, Ildefonso de las Munecas, from Tucumán. They left Cuzco in mid-August and received the support of thousands of indigenous people in the districts of Azángaro and Carabaya. They took the city of Puno without resistance on August 26, after Governor Manuel Químper abandoned it. There 18 Spaniards were captured and executed with clubs and stones. Then they headed towards the garrison that protected the Desaguadero river crossing, where the royalist Joaquín Revuelta was located with 13 artillery pieces and 160 men, who deserted when the Cusqueños arrived on September 11. From there, Pinelo tried to coordinate actions with the head of the republicans of Upper Peru, Juan Antonio Álvarez de Arenales, writing him a letter on September 15 and issuing a proclamation in favor of the government of Buenos Aires:

Oh happy and memorable revolution (...) that of the inhabitants of the Río de la Plata, which, although at such a cost, has shown the paths by which we must guide ourselves to the state of our happiness!

The rebel army, made up of 500 riflemen, 37 cannons, called viborones, and 5,000 Indians armed with spears, slings, clubs, and batons headed for La Paz, a city protected by the governor, the Marquis of Valdehoyos, with 300 men and 4 pieces of artillery. On September 24, La Paz was occupied by Pinelo after two days of siege, committing excesses with the population. He was followed by 20,000 men, mainly Indians armed with spears, slings and batons, only 500 with rifles, and 8 cannons. Because of an explosion in which rebel soldiers died, 52 Spaniards and 16 Creoles from the city were killed. Among those killed was the governor Marquis of Valdehoyos and the parents of future Bolivian presidents Andrés de Santa Cruz and José Ballivián.

Pinelo and Muñecas organized a government meeting in La Paz, made up of José Astete, Eugenio Medina and José Agustín Arze. They then set up camp at Laja, from where they again tried to contact Álvarez de Arenales. On November 24, he sent them congratulations from Buenos Aires, promising to march with them to liberate the entire American continent.

=== Huamanga Division ===
The second division occupied Huamanga on September 20, under the command of the Argentine Manuel Hurtado de Mendoza, who had as lieutenants the cleric José Gabriel Béjar and Mariano Angulo. Hurtado de Mendoza ordered a march towards Huancayo, which was taken peacefully.

Viceroy Abascal sent well-equipped and disciplined troops from Lima, among which were part of the Talavera de la Reina Regiment, under the command of Colonel Vicente González. These troops were reinforced with Huantine militias, since Huanta remained faithful to the Spanish crown. The battle of Huanta took place on September 30, 1814, the actions lasted three days, after which the patriots withdrew, leaving Huamanga. They reorganized in Andahuaylas and faced the royalists again on January 27, 1815, at the Battle of Matará, where they were again defeated.

Thanks to the Cangallo guerrillas, who managed to hinder the royalist advance, the patriots reorganized again. Meanwhile, Hurtado de Mendoza, managed to form a force with 800 men armed with rifles and shotguns, 18 cannons, 2 culverins (8, cast and manufactured in Abancay), 40 boxes of supplies and 5,000 indigenous mounted and armed with rejones. These forces were placed under the command of José Manuel Romano, nicknamed Pucatoro (from Quechua: "Red Bull"). In this way, the patriot forces had resolved a difficult situation; however, Romano's defection prevented a happy outcome for them. Romano killed Hurtado de Mendoza and surrendered to the royalists. This caused the dispersion of the patriots and the capture of the leaders of the revolt. The traitor would receive his punishment at the hands of Colonel José María Castañeda in 1825.

=== Arequipa Division ===
A black flag was used by Mariano Melgar in Umachiri.

The third patriot group campaigned in Arequipa under the command of Brigadier Mateo Pumacahua, seconded by Vicente Angulo. Pumacahua's army had 500 riflemen, a cavalry regiment and 5,000 Indians. Pumacahua, as the curaca of Chinchero, had great control and leadership among the Indians.

In Arequipa, Field Marshal Francisco Picoaga and Mayor José Gabriel Moscoso, with reinforcements from Lima, confronted Pumacahua's troops at the Battle of La Apacheta on November 10, 1814. With the support of numerous civilian volunteers that were added from Cuzco, the patriots triumphed. After that victory, the authority of Captain General Angulo extended to the Pacific coast. They took Mayor Moscoso and Marshal Picoaga prisoner. The patriots entered Arequipa, where on November 12 Brigadier Pumacahua, representing the Cuzco patriot government, issued a solemn "intimidation" or declaration of war to Viceroy Abascal. Due to pressure from the Cusco troops, the Arequipa council recognized the Cuzco Junta on November 24.

Upon being informed of the war measures arranged by the viceroy and aware of the proximity of royalist troops, Pumacahua and Angulo decided to fall back around Cuzco, leaving all the occupied municipalities and provinces free. An open town hall in Arequipa reconvened and hurriedly agreed to allegiance to the king on November 30, 1814.

== Royalist counterattack ==
Moved by Castro's attempt, the head of the royalist army of Upper Peru, Joaquín de la Pezuela, sent from Santiago de Cotagaita a division under the command of Juan Ramírez Orozco with 1,500 riflemen and many auxiliary Indians, mostly from Chichas and Tarija. They arrived in Oruro on October 15. From there Ramírez sent two companies over La Paz. The Cuzco revolutionaries partially crossed the Desaguadero and were defeated in the Chacaltaya/Achocalla on November 2, 1814. The next day Ramírez entered the ruined city of La Paz, where 108 rebels were executed, the independentists of Pinelo quickly retreating to Puno.

Priest Muñecas took refuge with 200 people from La Paz in the partido of Larecaja, where he formed a guerrilla group that was the base of the republiqueta of Larecaja. Establishing himself General-in-chief of the Auxiliary Army of the country in the United Provinces of the Río de la Plata, he formed the Sacred Battalion with indigenous people. It was first established in Sorata and later in Ayata. The definitive defeat of the republiqueta of Larecaja occurred on February 27, 1816, in the battle on the heights of Choquellusca, where the royalist chiefs Agustín Gamarra and Aveleira defeated the Sacred Battalion and then took Muñecas prisoner. Muñecas was subsequently assassinated on July 7, 1816.

On November 17, Ramírez continued his rapid advance towards the viceroyalty of Peru, leaving José Landaverí as intendant governor of La Paz, with a company and 4 artillery pieces. The royalist troops under the command of Juan Ramírez Orozco entered Arequipa on December 9, 1814. There, Ramírez Orozco applied severe penalties against the known patriots of the city. This gave rise to Angulo ordering in Cusco the execution of his two main prisoners of war: Marshal Picoaga and Mayor Moscoso. For the viceroy, this meant the "war to the death" against the patriots. Others say that it was Pumacahua, drunk, who gave the order because Picoaga did not receive him with honors when he capitulated. By then the revolution was in serious trouble: announcements were coming of the coming of a great expedition to reconquer the Overseas provinces, Chile had returned to monarchical power and Cochabamba refused to bow to the insurrection.

Meanwhile, on February 8, 1815, with representatives from all the provinces of the administration, the Cabildo of Cusco ratified the proclamation of August. The "excellent captain general and political governor" José Angulo swore there the solemn oath to "love and defend the country, not allowing everything that belongs to you to be offended, nor to work against it, nor to give rise to foreign enemies."

After regaining strength and reinforcing his militia, General Ramírez left Arequipa in search of the patriots on February 12, 1815. He left General Pío Tristán as governor of Arequipa. On March 11, near Ayaviri in Puno, the decisive Battle of Umachiri/Humachiri took place, which tipped the balance in favor of the royalists. Despite the realistic numerical inferiority (1,200 soldiers against no less than 12,000 patriots), discipline and the best tactical ability prevailed. A large force led by Pumacahua surrounded the royalists with the swollen Lalli River behind them, while on the other side the patriot artillery fired at them. Ramírez boldly dismantled his equipment, made his best troops cross the river, with water up to his chest, and from the other shore he captured the artillery from Cuzco and returned the attack, giving time for the rest of his forces to confront Pumacahua with a newfound advantage. In the midst of the confusion caused by this action, General Ramírez ordered the "cutting attack". The Spanish military report, signed on Friday, May 12, 1815, reports "seven dead by bullets, six drowned in the river and seven wounded" on the royalist side, while the patriotic dead, mostly civilians without much training, numbered more than a thousand. There were numerous executions on the battlefield, including that of the poet Mariano Melgar.

== End of the rebellion ==
General Ramírez occupied Cuzco on March 25, 1815. On April 21, he ordered the executions of most of the surviving patriotic leaders: Pumacahua, the brothers José, Vicente and Mariano Angulo, José Gabriel Béjar, Pedro Tudela and others. José Angulo's uniform and his military banner were sent by Ramírez to the viceroy as trophies of war. Thus concluded one of the first chapters of the Peruvian War of Independence.
