= Battle of Huanta (1814) =

Battle during the Cuzco Rebellion of 1814

- Part of the Cuzco Rebellion of 1814
Date	30 September–1 October 1814 or 2–3 October 1814
Location	Huanta, Viceroyalty of Peru
Result	Royalist victory

Belligerents
Government Junta of Cuzco	Spain

Commanders and leaders
Manuel Hurtado; José Gabriel Béjar	Vicente González

Strength
5,000 troops 4 cannons	820 men 4 cannons

The Battle of Huanta took place between rebel and Spanish forces during the Cuzco Rebellion of 1814.
