= Intendancy of Puno =

Intendancy of the Spanish Empire

Intendencia de Puno
- Intendancy of the Spanish Empire
- 1784–1824
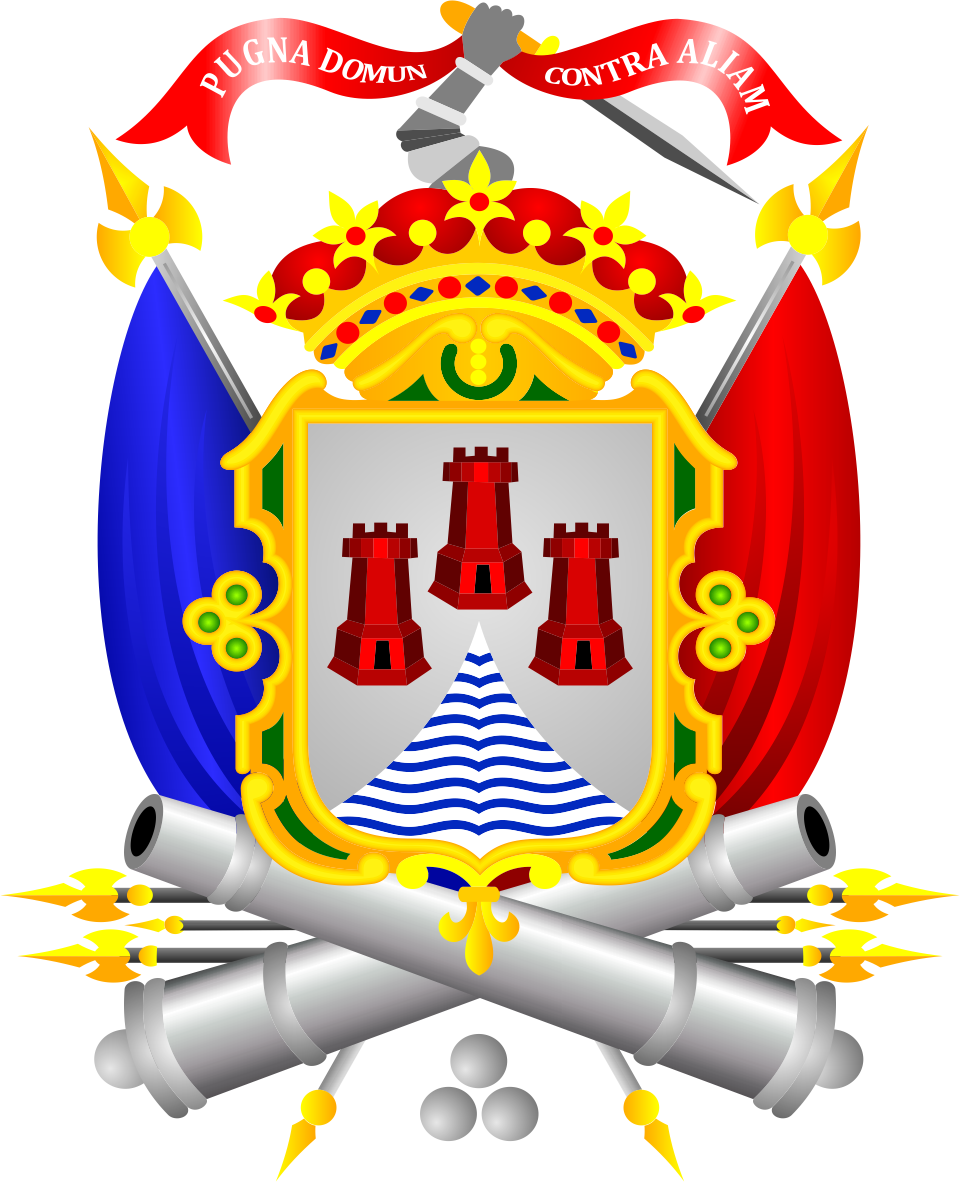
- Coat of arms

- The intendancy within Peru in 1810
- Capital: San Carlos de Puno
- Government
- Intendant
  - 1784–1788: José Reseguín (first)
  - 1824: Pablo Echevarría (last)
- Historical era: Viceroyalties of the Río de la Plata and Peru
  - Established: 5 June 1784
  - Disestablished: 27 December 1824
- Subdivisions
  - Type: Partidos
  - Units: See relevant section
Preceded by	Succeeded by
Intendancy of La Paz	Department of Puno

The Intendancy of Puno (Spanish: Intendencia de Puno), also known informally as Puno Province (Spanish: Provincia de Puno), was one of the territorial divisions of the Spanish Empire in the Altiplano region, initially as part of the Viceroyalty of the Río de la Plata and later of the Viceroyalty of Peru. The territory was ruled from San Carlos de Puno.

It was created in 1784 and remained in Spanish hands until December 27, 1824, when Brigadier Pablo Echevarría handed over the city of San Carlos de Puno to General Rudecindo Alvarado. Since then it became the department of Puno, within the Republic of Peru.

== History ==
On December 22, 1574, Viceroy Francisco Álvarez de Toledo reorganized the corregimientos (townships) of the Viceroyalty of Peru, placing the Indian townships of Chucuito and Paucarcolla under the jurisdiction of the corregidor of La Paz, and those of Collasuyo del Collao (Azángaro), Urcosuyo in Collao (Lampa) and Carabaya, under the jurisdiction of that of Cuzco. The population of Puno received the title of villa (town) and head of the province of Paucarcolla on November 4, 1668, when it was granted by the viceroy of Peru Pedro Antonio Fernández de Castro. In 1776, the Indian townships of Carabaya, Lampa, Azángaro, and Paucarcolla and the government of Chucuito became part of the Viceroyalty of the Río de la Plata.

When on January 28, 1782, King Charles III promulgated the "Royal Ordinance for the establishment and instruction of intendants of the army and province in the Viceroyalty of Buenos Aires", the territories that would later constitute the intendancy of Puno were included within the intendancy of La Paz as well as the districts of Paucarcolla, Chucuito, Lampa, Azángaro, and Carabaya.

At the end of the rebellion of Túpac Amaru II, and at the proposal of the viceroy Juan José de Vértiz y Salcedo and the superintendent Francisco de Paula Sanz on December 31, 1783, the king created the intendancy of Puno, segregating the partidos from that of La Paz (or subdelegations) of: Chucuito, Lampa, Azángaro, Carabaya, and Paucarcolla. With the latter, the capital of the intendancy was formed with headquarters in the town of San Carlos de Puno, which was elevated to a city on October 14, 1805. The main reason why the intendancy of Puno was created was that the Intendancy of La Paz covered a very extensive territory.

The date of creation of the intendancy is discussed by various authors, with the prevailing opinion that it was created on June 5, 1784. On June 14, 1784, by means of a royal order, the appointment of José Reseguín as the first intendant was communicated to Viceroy Vértiz.

The partidos of Lampa, Azángaro and Carabaya were in the district of the Real Audiencia of Charcas and the bishopric of Cuzco, while those of Chucuito and Paucarcolla were in the same court and the bishopric of La Paz. Paucarcolla District (Guancané or Puno Capital), with its headquarters in the town of Guancané, was recreated in 1793 for the indigenous people of the town of Puno.

When the Real Audiencia of Cuzco was created in 1787, the partidos of Lampa, Azángaro and Carabaya became part of its district. A royal decree of February 1, 1796 incorporated the intendancy of Puno into the Viceroyalty of Peru, passing the districts of Chucuito and Paucarcolla to the jurisdiction of the Real Audiencia of Cuzco.

The decree of April 26, 1822 ordered that the new department of Puno elect 6 regular deputies and 3 substitutes for the first Congress of Peru, but it could not be carried out because the administration continued in royalist hands until after the battle of Ayacucho. On June 16, 1822, the provincial council of Puno was created, without abolishing the mayor's office, which was continued to exist until February 27, 1824. The intendancy ceased to exist on December 27, 1824, when Brigadier Pablo Echevarría handed over the city Puno to General Rudecindo Alvarado, becoming the department of Puno, within the Republic of Peru.

== Subdivisions ==
The intendancy was divided into five partidos.

Partido	Head (city of government)
Chucuito	Chucuito
Paucarcolla	Huancané
Lampa	Santiago de Lampa
Azángaro	Azángaro
Carabaya	Crucero

== Intendants ==
The governors (intendants) were:

- As part of the Viceroyalty of the Río de la Plata:
  - José Reseguín, Dragoons colonel (14 June 1784 – 6 August 1788)
  - José Joaquín Contreras, advisor lieutenant (6 August 1788 – 1790; interim)
  - Francisco José de Mesa Ponte y Castillo, Marquis of Casa Hermosa, Colonel (1 January 1790 – 1795)
  - José Antonio de Campos, of the Order of Charles III (1795 – 1796; interim)
- As part of the Viceroyalty of Peru:
  - Tomás de Semper, of the Order of Santiago (1 January 1796 – 31 March 1801)
  - Dr. Ignacio Maldonado (31 March 1801 – 17 December 1801)
  - José González de Navarra y Montoya, Colonel of the Order of Santiago (18 September 1801 – 30 June 1806)
  - Manuel Quimper Benítez del Pino, comisario ordenador (1 November 1806 – late January 1810)
  - Diego Antonio Nieto, Colonel (1 February 1810 – 22 March 1810)
  - Mariano Agustín (Agustino) del Carpio, advisor lieutenant (22 March 1810 – 12 July 1810)
  - Manuel Quimper Benítez del Pino (13 July 1810 – 14 August 1814; interim)
  - Juan Manuel Velarde (14 August 1814 – November 1814; revolutionary government)
  - Martín de Rivarola, Alcalde (November 1814 – May 1815; interim)
  - Francisco de Paula González, Colonel (1815)
  - Narciso Urce Besagoitía, Colonel from Lampa (1816)
  - Tadeo Gárate, of the Order of Isabella the Catholic and of the Fleur-de-lis of France, honorary intendant of the army (22 January 1817 – late December 1824)
  - Pablo Echevarría (Late December 1824 – 27 December 1824; interim)

== See also ==
- Department of Puno
- Department of La Paz
