= Intendancy of Cuzco =

Intendancy of the Spanish Empire

Intendencia de Cuzco
- Intendancy of the Spanish Empire
- 1784–1824
- Coat of arms

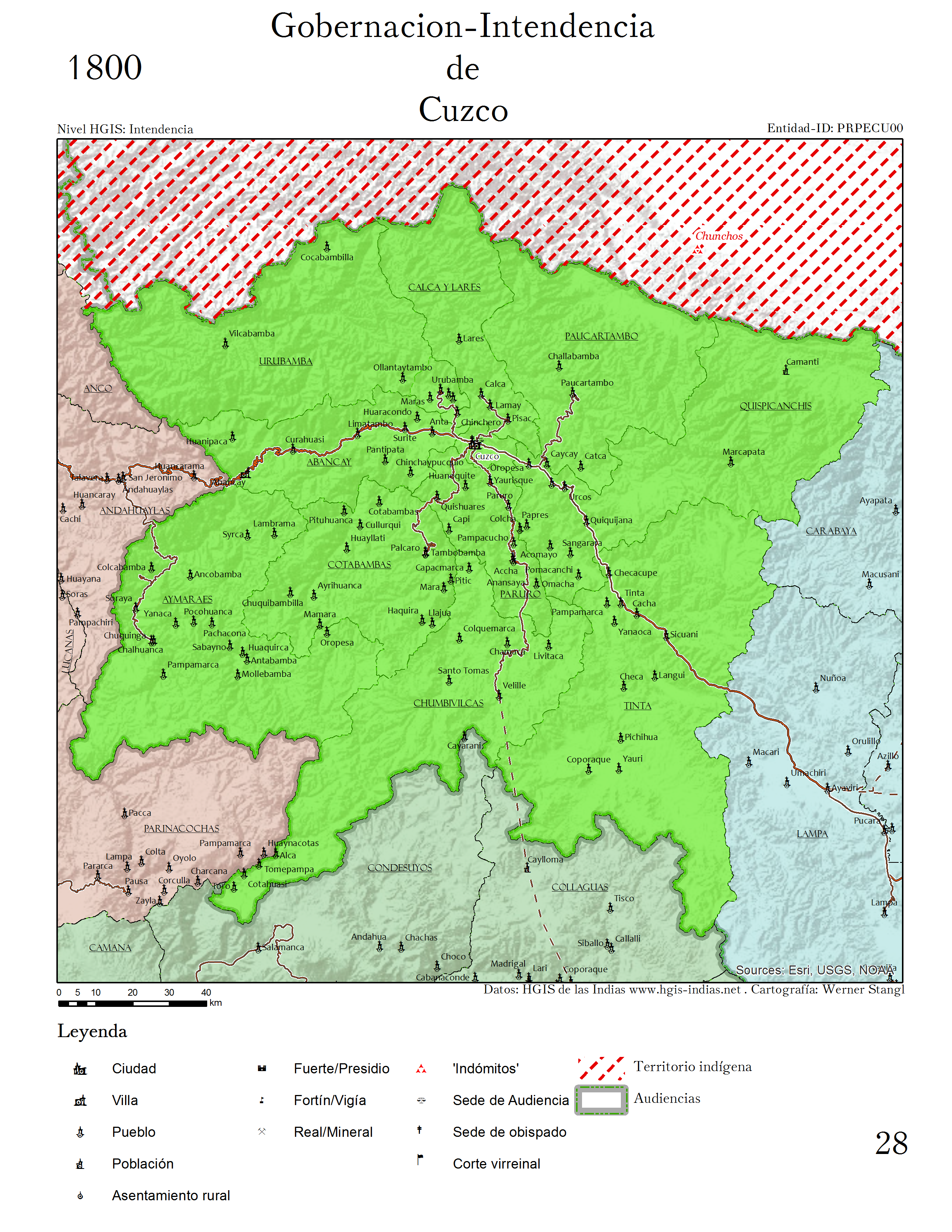
- Capital: Cuzco
- Government
- Intendant
  - 1784–1787: Benito de la Mata Linares (first)
  - 1816–1824: Antonio María Álvarez Tomás (last)
- Historical era: Viceroyalty of Peru
  - Established: 1784
  - Dissolved: December 1824
- Subdivisions
  - Type: Partidos
  - Units: See relevant section
Succeeded by
Department of Cuzco

The Intendancy of Cuzco (Spanish: Intendencia de Cuzco), also known informally as Cuzco Province (Spanish: Provincia de Cuzco), was one of the territorial divisions of the Viceroyalty of Peru, ruled from the city of Cuzco and under the jurisdiction of the Bishopric of Cuzco.

== History ==
Established in 1784, it was phased out during the Peruvian War of Independence, starting with the creation of the Department of Cuzco on April 26, 1822, as part of the Protectorate of Peru. After the royalist defeat at the Battle of Ayacucho on December 9, 1824, the news reached the intendancy later that month, with Pío de Tristán being chosen as interim viceroy until the Peruvian troops reached the city.

== Subdivisions ==
The intendancy was divided into eleven partidos.

Partido	Head (city of government)
Cuzco	Cuzco
Abancay	Abancay
Aymaraes	Aymaraes
Calca y Lares	Villa de Zamora
Cotabamba	Cotabamba
Chumbivilcas	Santo Tomás
Paruro	Paruro
Paucartambo	Paucartambo
Quispicanchis	Urcos
Urubamba	Urubamba
Tinta	Tinta

== Intendants ==
The Governors (intendants) who ruled the intendancy of Cuzco were:

- Benito de la Mata Linares, oidor of Lima (1784–1787)
- José de la Portilla, regent of the Audiencia as President (1787–1791)
- Carlos del Corral y Aguirre, Brigadier and President (1791–1793)
- José de la Portilla, regent (1793–1794; interim)
- Manuel Urriex, Count of Ruiz de Castilla, President (1794–1802)
- Francisco José de Mesa y Ponte Pagés, 1st Marquis of Casa Hermosa, of the Order of Santiago (1802–1803)
- Manuel Urriex, Count of Ruiz de Castilla (1803–1804)
- Francisco Muñoz de San Clemente, Jefe de Escuadra of the Order of Calatrava (1804–1809
- José Manuel de Goyeneche, 1st Count of Guaqui (1809–1812)
- Mateo García Pumacahua, Brigadier (1812; interim)
- José Manuel de Goyeneche, 1st Count of Guaqui, Field Marshal (1812–1814)
- Martín de la Concha y Jara, Brigadier (1814–1815)
  - Bartolomé Cucalón (1814; named)
  - The Marquis of Valdehoyos (1814; named)
- Mariano Ricafort Palacín y Abarca, Colonel (1815–1816; interim)
- Pío de Tristán, Brigadier (1816; interim)
- Antonio María Álvarez Tomás (1816–1824)

== See also ==
- Department of Cuzco
