= Viceroyalty of Peru =

South American administrative district of Spain (1542–1824)

Viceroyalty of Peru Virreinato del Perú
- 1542–1824
- Coat of arms of Lima (Note: The coat of arms of Lima, the capital of the Viceroyalty, was used to represent the entire territory, as seen in the Hall of Realms in Spain.)
- Motto: Plus Ultra (Latin) "Further Beyond"
- Anthem: Marcha Real "Royal March" (1775–1821)
- Flags of Spain (Note: First national flag, naval and fortress flag, the last flag to float in the continental Americas, in the Real Felipe Fortress.) (left) and the Cross of Burgundy (Note: Military flag.) (right)

- Location of the Viceroyalty of Peru: initial de jure territory 1542–1718 (light green) and final territory 1776–1798 (Note: Chile was segregated from the Viceroyalty on 1798) (dark green)
- Status: Viceroyalty of the Spanish Empire
- Capital: Lima (1535–1821); Cusco (1821–1824)
- Common languages: Spanish (official, administrative); Quechua; Kichwa; Aymara; Puquina; Mapudungun
- Religion: Catholic Church
- King
  - 1544–46 (first): Charles I
  - 1816–24 (last): Ferdinand VII
- Viceroy
  - 1544–46 (first): Blasco Núñez Vela
  - 1821–24 (last): José de la Serna
- Historical era: Spanish Empire
  - Established: 20 November 1542
  - Vilcabamba: May 1572
  - New Granada: 27 May 1717
  - Río de la Plata: 1 August 1776
  - Independence declared: 28 July 1821
  - Battle of Ayacucho: 9 December 1824
  - Dissolved: 30 December 1824
  - Fall of Callao: 23 January 1826

Area
  - Total: 1,340,000 km^{2} (520,000 sq mi)

Population
  - 1650 estimate: 3,000,000
- Currency: Spanish dollar
Preceded by
Neo-Inca State
Governorate of New Castile
Governorate of New Toledo
Province of Tierra Firme
Governorate of New Andalusia
Succeeded by
Kingdom of Chile
Free Province of Guayaquil
Protectorate of San Martín
Viceroyalty of New Granada
Viceroyalty of the Río de la Plata

The Viceroyalty of Peru (Spanish: Virreinato del Perú [birei̯ˈnato ðel peˈɾu]), officially known as the Kingdom of Peru (Spanish: Reino del Perú), was a Spanish imperial provincial administrative district. Created in 1542, it encompassed modern Peru and most of the Spanish Empire in South America, including regions of Panama and islands in Oceania, governed from the capital of Lima. From the sixteenth to the eighteenth centuries, Peru was one of the only two Spanish viceroyalties active in the Americas, the other being the Viceroyalty of New Spain.

After establishing the capital Lima in 1535 by Francisco Pizarro and Spanish conquest of the Inca Empire, the region of Peru suffered internal power struggles between many of the Conquistadors. To end the internal conflict, King Charles I by royal decree, signed the New Laws which established the Kingdom of Peru, which would encompass most of South America, setting Blasco Núñez Vela as the first Viceroy. Peru would greatly contribute to the wealth of the region and to Spain, with the discovery of gold, silver, and mercury. Cerro Rico in Potosí became the largest silver mine in the world, which made Peru the greatest distributor of silver. Reforms carried out by Viceroy Francisco de Toledo greatly changed the political administration in South America and the economy, which also led to the exploitation of the indigenous peoples. These reforms would lead to many uprisings which aimed to overthrow Spanish control.

The Spanish did not resist the Portuguese expansion of Brazil across the meridian established by the Treaty of Tordesillas. The treaty was rendered meaningless between 1580 and 1640 while Spain controlled Portugal. The creation during the 18th century of the Viceroyalties of New Granada and Río de la Plata (at the expense of Peru's territory) reduced the importance of Lima and shifted the lucrative Andean trade to Buenos Aires, while the fall of the mining and textile production accelerated the progressive decay of the Viceroyalty of Peru. Despite territorial losses, at the beginning of the 19th century, the Viceroyalty of Peru was still the main possession of the Spanish Monarchy in South America, being one of its main sources of wealth. However, by the end of the viceregal period, almost eighty percent of all American wealth came from the Viceroyalty of New Spain.

The Spanish American wars of independence brought an end to the Viceroyalty of Peru. From the outset of the conflict, the viceroyalty maintained its commitment to the integrity of the Spanish Monarchy, sending expeditions to suppress the insurgent governing juntas that formed in its border territories. During this first stage, beginning in 1810, Peruvian conspiracies and autonomous uprisings occurred, which were suppressed by the Royal Army of Peru. In 1820, mutiny of the troops being sent from Spain halted reinforcements to the Viceroyalty.

The Capitulation of Ayacucho, signed on December 9, 1824, marked the end of the royalist military effort, by which the viceregal authorities recognized their defeat and the independence of Peru, as well as Chile, Colombia, Panama, Ecuador, Bolivia, Paraguay, Uruguay, and Argentina, at one point or another had constituted the Viceroyalty of Peru. However, isolated and without support, the last royalist strongholds, such as the Real Felipe Fortress in Callao and the Chiloé Archipelago, would finally fall in 1826.

== History ==
=== Conquest of Peru ===
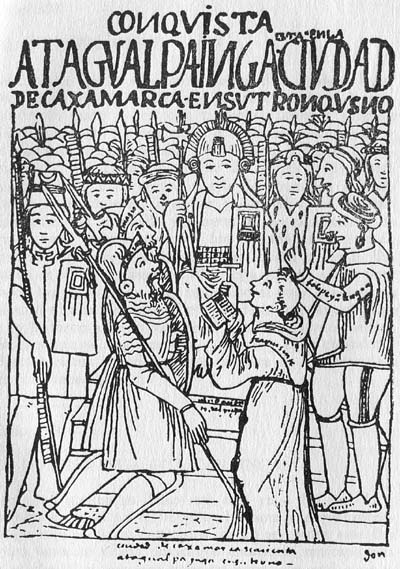
Francisco Pizarro meets the Inca emperor Atahualpa in 1532.

Francisco Pizarro and the conquistadors arrived in Peru in 1532, establishing the first city of San Miguel de Piura. Traditionally, the Spanish conquest of the Inca Empire is considered to have begun on November 16, 1532, when the Inca army encountered the Spanish conquistadors in Cajamarca, shortly after the end of the civil war between the two heirs to the Inca throne, Huáscar and Atahualpa (sons of the Inca Huayna Capac). After the Battle of Cajamarca, Atahualpa was taken prisoner by the Spanish and executed months later, on July 26, 1533, and the conquest of Peru began.

The complete defeat of the Incas would not occur until 1572, thanks to the help of their indigenous allies. Charles V granted the conquistadors with adelantados, giving them the right to become governors and justices of the region they conquered. Prior to the establishment of the Viceroyalty of Peru, several major governorates formed from these grants, including the Governorate of New Castile (1529), Governorate of New Toledo (1534), Governorate of New Andalusia (1534), and Province of Tierra Firme (1539). However, many civil wars were fought between the conquerors of Peru regarding power of the region. These struggles lasted from 1537 to 1554, with periods of relative peace. They began with the capture of Cusco by Diego de Almagro and culminated with the suppression of the last rebellion of encomenderos, led by Francisco Hernández Girón. Shortly thereafter, Andrés Hurtado de Mendoza initiated the definitive pacification of Peru.

=== Creation of the Viceroyalty ===
During the process that led to the fall of the Inca Empire, a conflict erupted among the conquistadors. To bring it to a close, on 20 November 1542 , King Charles I of Spain signed the New Laws in Barcelona by Royal Decree. This legislative package for the Indies established the Viceroyalty of Peru, officially the Kingdom of Peru, replacing the former governorships of New Castile and New Toledo, and transferred the seat of the Royal Audiencia of Panama to Lima, the capital of the new viceroyalty.

Blasco Núñez Vela was Peru's first viceroy, appointed by royal decree on 1 March 1543. However, he was unable to exercise royal authority due to the clashes between the supporters of Francisco Pizarro and Diego de Almagro, for control of Peru, and he was assassinated by Gonzalo Pizarro. The murder of the king's highest authority caused great consternation in Spain; the Crown resolved to severely punish whoever had attempted to assassinate the viceroy, the king's representative in conquered territories. To this end, Charles I sent Pedro de la Gasca with the title of Pacifier to resolve the situation. Once in Peru, La Gasca, confident that he had sown the seeds of treachery among Gonzalo Pizarro's supporters, confronted the conquistador near Cusco in 1548. Gonzalo Pizarro saw his captains defect to La Gasca's side, and his defeat was crushing. Taken to Cusco, he was executed for high treason against the king. A few years later, in 1551, Antonio de Mendoza was appointed viceroy, after having served in that position in the Viceroyalty of New Spain.

=== Toledo Reforms (1559–1581) ===
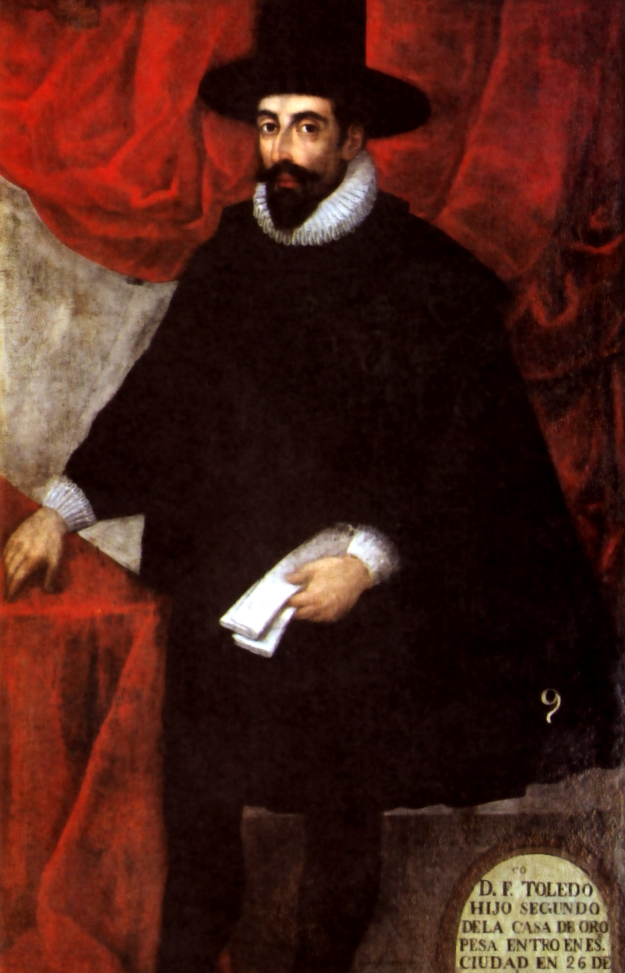
Viceroy Francisco de Toledo

After almost forty years of administrative disorder, the Peruvian Viceroyalty found an efficient leader in Viceroy Francisco de Toledo, who, between 1569 and 1581, managed to establish the political-administrative framework that governed for many years in viceregal Peru.

Upon arriving in Peru, Francisco Álvarez de Toledo immediately gathered information about everything that had transpired in the viceroyalty and the policies implemented up to that point. He recognized the lack of an adequate tax system, as there was no record of the viceroyalty's total population. Francisco de Toledo, "one of the great administrators of human times," established the Inquisition in the viceroyalty and promulgated laws that applied to Indians and Spanish alike, breaking the power of the encomenderos and reducing the old system of mita (the Incan system of mandatory labor tribute). He personally conducted several extensive general inspections of different parts of the viceroyalty, and for the first time, a record was kept of Peru's human and natural resources. After determining the number of potential taxpayers, he established the reducciones, indigenous settlements where approximately five hundred families were grouped together. This allowed for a precise understanding of the amount of tribute they were required to pay.

Viceroy Francisco de Toledo promoted the distribution of indigenous labor through the Mita system. This system provided labor for the rich mines of Potosí, in the province of Charcas, which produced immense quantities of silver ore, and for Huancavelica, from which mercury was extracted, necessary for silver refining. This system helped to make Peru one of the most important silver-producing centers in the world. He also improved the defensibility of the viceroyalty with fortifications, bridges, and la Armada del Mar del Sur (the Southern Fleet) against pirates. He ended the indigenous Neo-Inca State in Vilcabamba, executing the last Sapa Inca Túpac Amaru, and promoted economic development from the commercial monopoly and mineral extraction, mainly from silver mines in Potosí.

=== Exploration and settlement ===
The Amazon Basin and some large adjoining regions had been considered Spanish territory since the Treaty of Tordesillas and explorations such as that by Francisco de Orellana, but Portugal fell under Spanish control between 1580 and 1640. During this time, Portuguese territories in Brazil were controlled by the Spanish crown, which did object to the spread of Portuguese settlement into parts of the Amazon Basin that the treaty had awarded to Spain. Still, Luis Jerónimo de Cabrera, 4th Count of Chinchón sent out a third expedition to explore the Amazon River, under Cristóbal de Acuña; this was part of the return leg of the expedition of Pedro Teixeira.

Some Pacific islands and archipelagoes were visited by Spanish ships in the sixteenth century, but they made no effort to trade with or colonize them. These included New Guinea (by Ýñigo Ortiz de Retez in 1545), the Solomon Islands (in 1568), and the Marquesas Islands (in 1595) by Álvaro de Mendaña de Neira.

The first Jesuit reduction to Christianize the indigenous population was founded in 1609, but some areas occupied by Brazilians as bandeirantes gradually extended their activities through much of the basin and adjoining Mato Grosso in the 17th and 18th centuries. These groups had the advantage of remote geography and river access from the mouth of the Amazon, which was in Portuguese territory. Meanwhile, the Spanish were barred by their laws from enslaving indigenous people, leaving them without a commercial interest deep in the interior of the basin. (Note: The Laws of Burgos (1512) and the New Laws (1542) had been intended to protect the interests of indigenous people. In spirit they were often abused, as through forced exploitative labor of locals, but they did prevent widespread formal enslavement of indigenous people in Spanish territories. Renegade slavers, operating illegally in Spanish territory, did so as agents of the Portuguese slave markets in Brazil.)

A famous attack upon a Spanish mission in 1628 resulted in the enslavement of 60,000 indigenous people. (Note: An early bandeira in 1628, led by Antônio Raposo Tavares, composed of 2,000 allied Indians, 900 Mamluks (Mestizos) and 69 white Paulistanos, to find precious metals and stones and / or to capture Indians for slavery. This expedition alone was responsible for the destruction of most of the Jesuit missions of Spanish Guairá and the enslavement of more than 60,000 indigenous people. In response, the missions that followed were militarized.) As time passed, they were used as a self-funding occupation force by the Portuguese authorities in what was effectively a low-level war of territorial conquest.

In 1617, viceroy Francisco de Borja y Aragón divided the government of Río de la Plata in two, Buenos Aires and Paraguay, both dependencies of the Viceroyalty of Peru. He established the Tribunal del Consulado, a court and administrative body for commercial affairs in the viceroyalty. Diego Fernández de Córdoba, Marquis of Guadalcázar, reformed the fiscal system and stopped the interfamily rivalry that was bloodying the domain.

Other viceroys, such as Fernando Torres, Fernández de Cabrera, and Fernández Córdoba expanded the royal navy and fortified the ports to resist foreign incursions, such as those led by privateer Thomas Cavendish. Fernández de Cabrera also suppressed an insurrection of the Uru and Mapuche Indians.

=== Economic boom ===
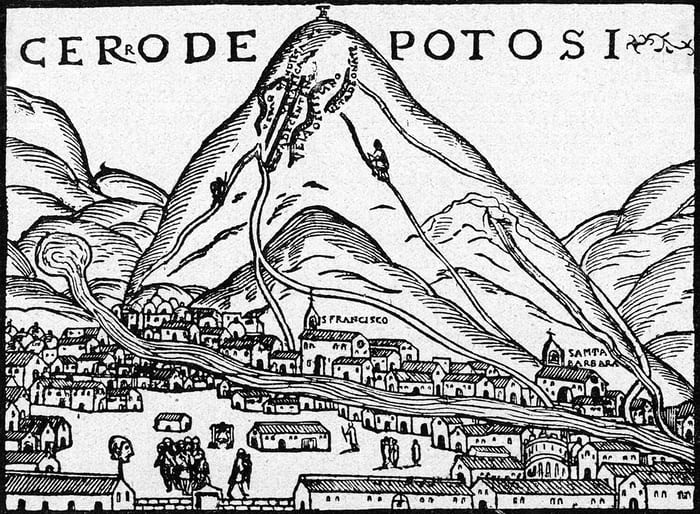
First image of the Cerro Rico mine in Potosí to reach Europe, by Pedro Cieza de León in 1552.

Between 1580 and 1650, the mercantilist economic system was definitively established in Peru with the emergence of large-scale mining thanks to the exploitation of the silver veins of Potosí through amalgamation with the mercury from Huancavelica.

The balance between the economic agents of Huancavelica was going through a delicate juncture at the beginning of 1660. To help the mercury miners, the viceroy Luis Enríquez de Guzmán and the Count of Santisteban, sent them a substantial aid of 232,000 pesos, but the person in charge of its management, the corregidor Tomás Berjón de Caviedes, did not know how to distribute it as expected; the money was lost in an intricate labyrinth of miners, merchants, and Crown employees, and it took almost two decades to clarify what had happened.

In military terms, the Viceroyalty of Peru financed and provided military support, through the royal subsidy and the dispatch of soldiers and supplies from Peru, to the campaigns against the Mapuche in the Arauco War, which extended throughout much of the viceregal period. In 1662 alone, 950 soldiers and 300,000 pesos were sent for war expenses. Similarly, the general directives for conducting the campaign originated from the Peruvian Viceroyalty, such as the one sent by Viceroy Francisco de Borja y Aragón ordering a defensive war against the Native Americans and prohibiting their personal service.

=== The last Spanish Habsburgs (1643–1713) ===
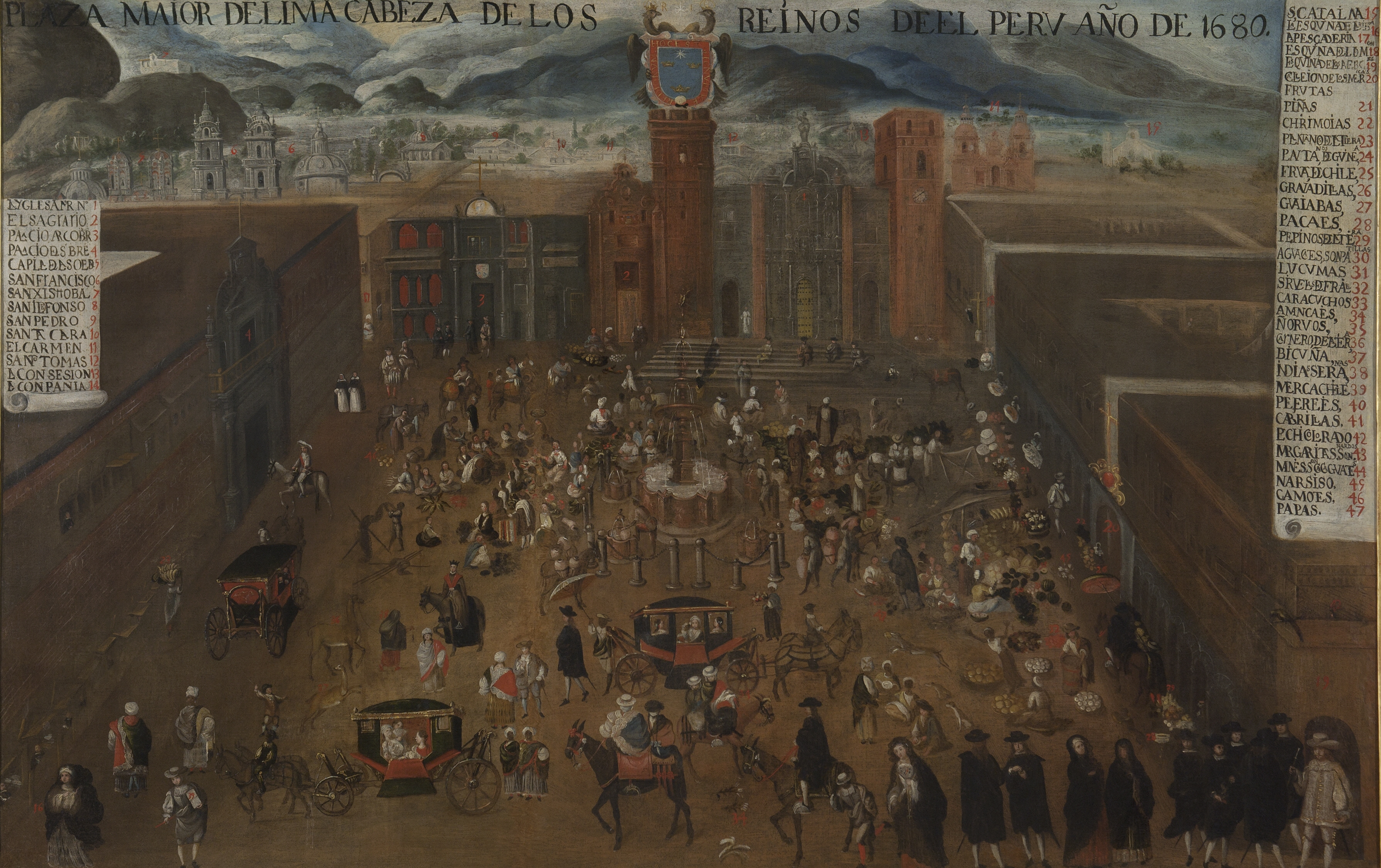
The "City of Kings" ,with the Cathedral of Lima under construction, and Plaza Mayor. Painting from 1680, Museo de América.

Viceroys had to protect the Pacific coast from French contraband and English and Dutch pirates and privateers. They expanded the naval forces, fortified the ports of Valdivia, Valparaíso, Arica and Callao and constructed city walls in Lima and Trujillo. Nevertheless, the famous Welsh privateer Henry Morgan took Chagres and captured and sacked the city of Panama in the early part of 1670. Also Peruvian forces repelled the attacks by Edward David in 1684 and 1686, Charles Wager and Thomas Colb in 1708. The Peace of Utrecht allowed the British to send ships and merchandise to the fair at Portobello.

In this period, revolts were common. Around 1656, Pedro Bohórquez crowned himself Inca (emperor) of the Calchaquí Indians, inciting the indigenous population to revolt. From 1665 until 1668, the rich mineowners José and Gaspar Salcedo revolted against the colonial government. The clergy were opposed to the nomination of prelates from Spain. Viceroy Diego Ladrón de Guevara had to take measures against an uprising of slaves at the hacienda of Huachipa de Lima. There were terrible earthquakes in 1656 and 1687, along with epidemics, too.

During Baltasar de la Cueva Enríquez's administration, the laws of the Indies were compiled. Diego de Benavides y de la Cueva issued the Ordenanza de Obrajes (Ordenance of Manufactures) in 1664 and Pedro Álvarez de Toledo y Leiva introduced the papel sellado (literally, sealed paper). In 1683 Melchor de Navarra y Rocafull reestablished the Lima mint, which had been closed since 1572. Viceroy Diego Ladrón de Guevara increased the production of silver in the mines of Potosí, and stimulated production in other mines at San Nicolás, Cajatambo and Huancavelica. He limited the manufacture of aguardiente from sugar cane to authorized factories, which he taxed heavily.

The Churches of Los Desamparados (1672), La Buena Muerte and the convent of Mínimos de San Francisco de Paula were finished and opened. The Hospital of Espiritu Santo in Lima and San Bartolomé hospital were built. By the end of the 16th and 17th century, the Viceroyalty of Peru became an economically welcoming place for immigrants.

=== The Bourbon Reforms (1713–1806) ===
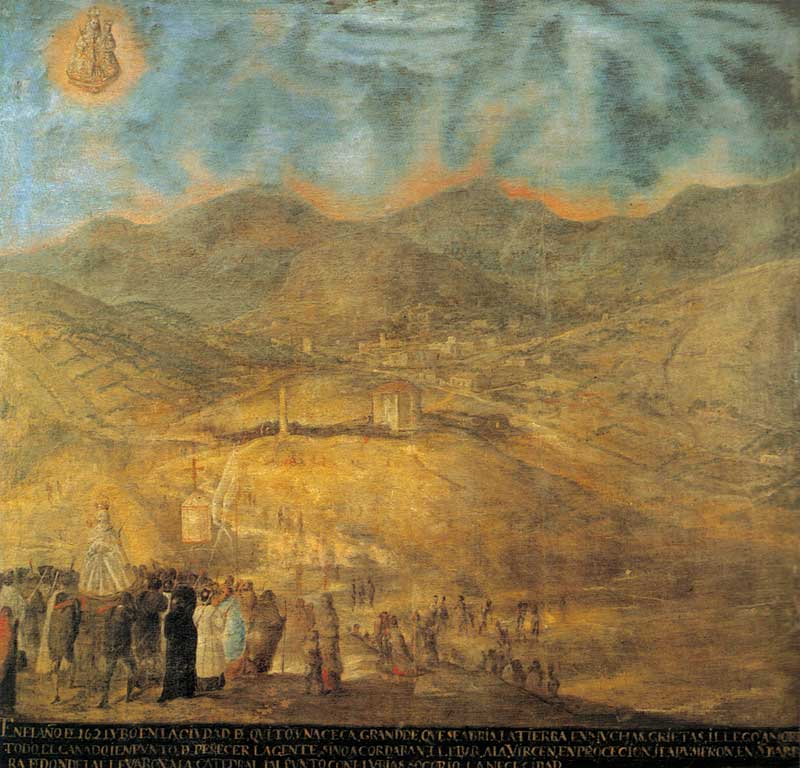
View of the city of Quito in 1757, by Miguel de Santiago.

In 1717, the Viceroyalty of New Granada was created from the northern territories, the Audiencias of Bogotá, Quito and Panama. This viceroyalty initially lasted only until 1724, but was reestablished permanently in 1740. With the creation of the Viceroyalty of the Río de la Plata from southern areas that are now Argentina, Bolivia, Paraguay and Uruguay in 1776, the Charcas and Buenos Aires audiencias were similarly lost. These losses of territory meant the loss of prominence of the Viceroyalty of Peru as the economic center of Spain in South America, although it continued to be the most valuable asset of the Crown, due to its political, social and cultural power.

The 256-year-old Treaty of Tordesillas was superseded by the 1750 Treaty of Madrid which granted Portugal control of the lands it had occupied in South America in the intervening centuries. This Portuguese occupation led to the Guaraní War of 1756. Amazonas is named after the Amazon River, and was formerly part of the Spanish Viceroyalty of Peru, a region called Spanish Guyana. It was settled by the Portuguese in the early 18th century and incorporated into the Portuguese Empire after the Treaty of Madrid in 1750. It became a state of the Brazilian Republic in 1889.

Several viceroys had scientific, political and economic impact on the Viceroyalty. Manuel de Amat y Juniet organized an expedition to Tahiti. Viceroy Teodoro de Croix also decentralized the government through the creation of eight intendencias in the area of the Audiencia of Lima, and two in the Captaincy General of Chile. Francisco Gil de Taboada reincorporated the region of Puno into the Viceroyalty of Peru. José de Armendáriz stimulated the production of silver and took steps against fraud, corruption and smuggling. Amat y Juniet established the first Regulation of Commerce and Organization of Customs rules, which led to the building of the customshouse in Callao. Teodoro de Croix collaborated in the creation of the Junta Superior de Comercio and the Tribunal de Minería (1786).

War between Spain and Britain again broke out, the War of Jenkins' Ear, taking place from 1739–1748. The port of Paita was captured and burned by British Admiral, George Anson, in 1741. His fleet would continue to attack the Viceroyalty along the coast of modern-day Chile and Peru. Amat y Juniet constructed the fortress of Real Felipe Fortress in Callao in 1774 in response.

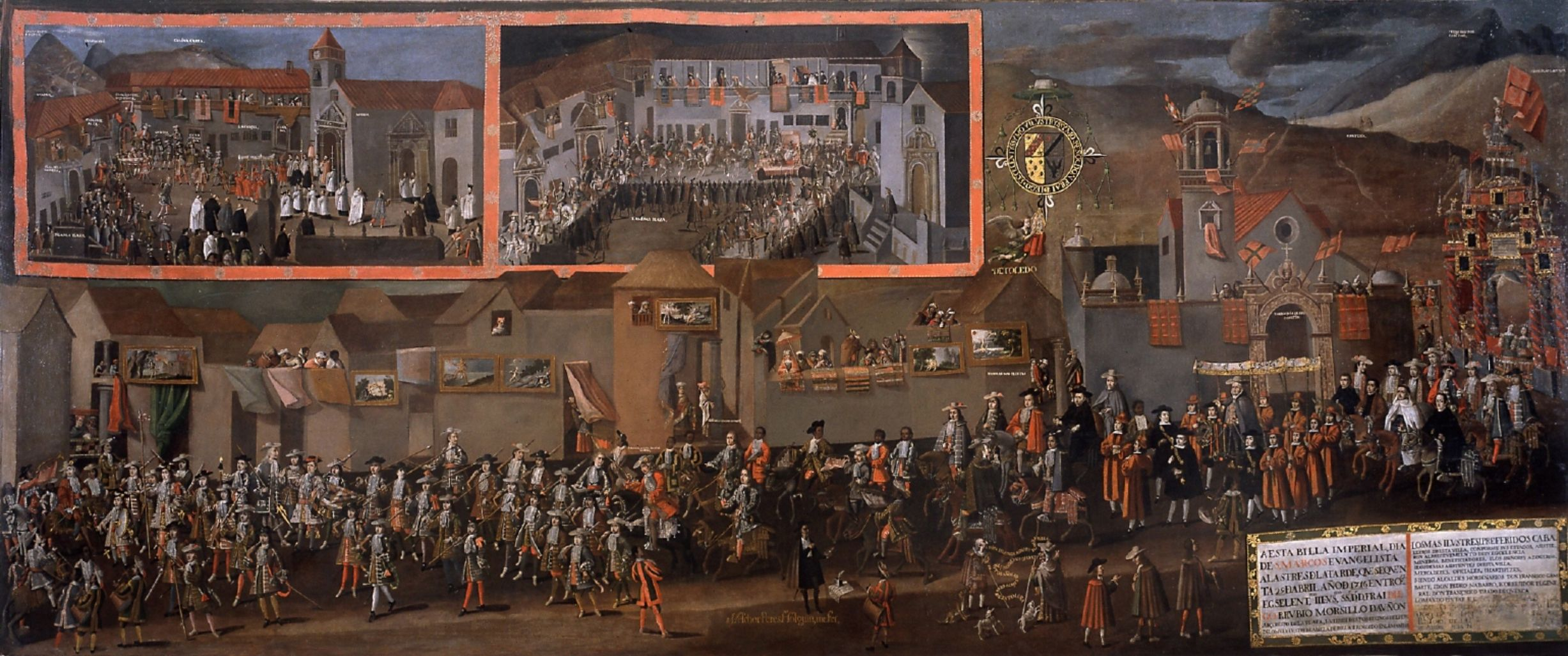
Entrance of Archbishop Viceroy Morcillo in Potosí by Melchor Pérez de Holguín, 1716.

An earthquake demolished Lima and Callao, in 1746. Viceroy Amat y Juniet constructed various public works in Lima, including the first bull ring. Manuel de Guirior also improved the medical care at ten hospitals in Lima and established a foundling home. The city of Lima, once the main city of South America and possessing a courtly and commercial life comparable to that of Madrid itself, lost much of its former wealth in the second half of the 18th century. This was compounded by the continued depletion of the rich silver deposits of Potosí, which had sustained the viceroyalty's economy for two centuries, until the entire territory of Charcas, also known as Upper Peru (present-day Bolivia), was united with the Viceroyalty of the Río de la Plata in 1776. The last years of that century, while generating a more efficient administration and better management of the viceroyalty's resources for the benefit of Spain, showed a serious decline in the overall wealth of the Peruvian Viceroyalty.

The expulsion of the Jesuits in 1768 led to the near abandonment of the territory of the General Command of Maynas, belonging to the Viceroyalty of New Granada, due to its difficult access. This caused the Crown to fear its loss because of the Portuguese expansionist policies in the Amazon basin. The king commissioned the former governor of Maynas, Francisco Requena, to prepare a report on the situation in the territory. Requena reported that the civil and ecclesiastical officials of Quito and Bogotá were unable to manage the region, and therefore suggested that it be reincorporated into the Viceroyalty of Peru along with the Government of Quijos, and that a missionary bishopric be established there.

The indigenous rebellions of the 18th century, which numbered over a hundred in the territory of the viceroyalty, were framed by the revival of Andean culture, especially the messianic ideals prevalent in the popular mindset that "the return of the Inca would bring about a better future", based on the Inkarri legend. This idea was clearly seen in the rebellion of Juan Santos Atahualpa in the central jungle in 1742, who incited the indigenous people to rebel against the Franciscan missions in the area. It was then that the viceroyalty began to militarize, and the viceroys prepared to face the difficult times of independence.

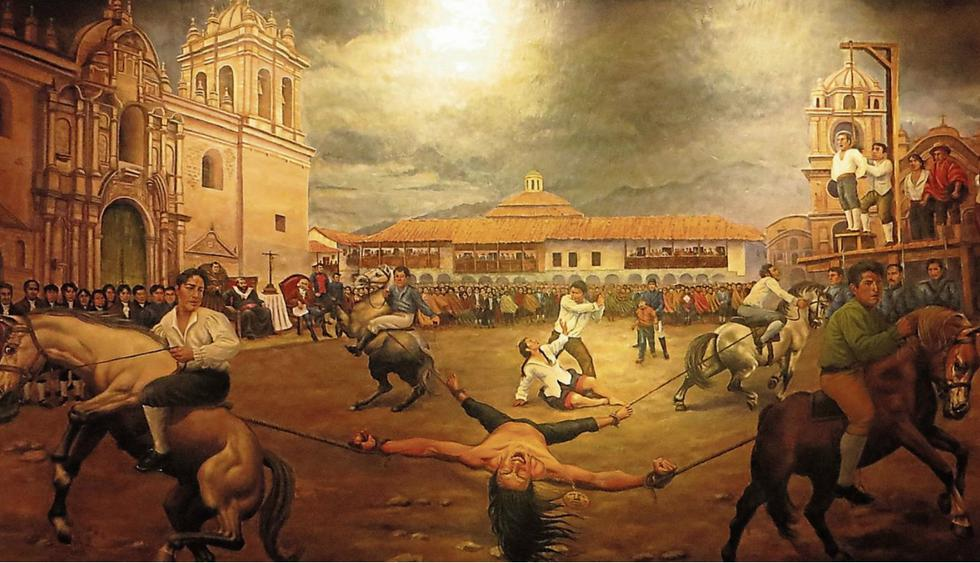
First execution attempt of Túpac Amaru II

The implementation of reforms in the Americas was carried out through general inspections. José Antonio de Areche was sent to Peru as the "inspector ." He quickly tackled the fiscal problem and raised the sales tax to 6%. He established internal customs offices to increase revenue and had to contend with the discontent of almost the entire population, especially when the curaca Túpac Amaru II, a descendant of the Incas of Vilcabamba, began the Rebellion of Túpac Amaru II in 1780, which began the largest uprising in Spanish colonial America. The rebellion, which cooperated of the rebellions of Túpac Katari and Tomás Katari, lasted until 1783 and extended throughout the Viceroyalty, from Peru to Upper Peru and northern Argentina, involving the death of over 100,000 people. The rebellion severely affected royalists affiliation towards Spain to the upcoming War of Independence, and led to the destruction of the kuraka and corregidor system and increased security on the indigenous peoples.

=== End of the Viceroyalty (1806–1824) ===
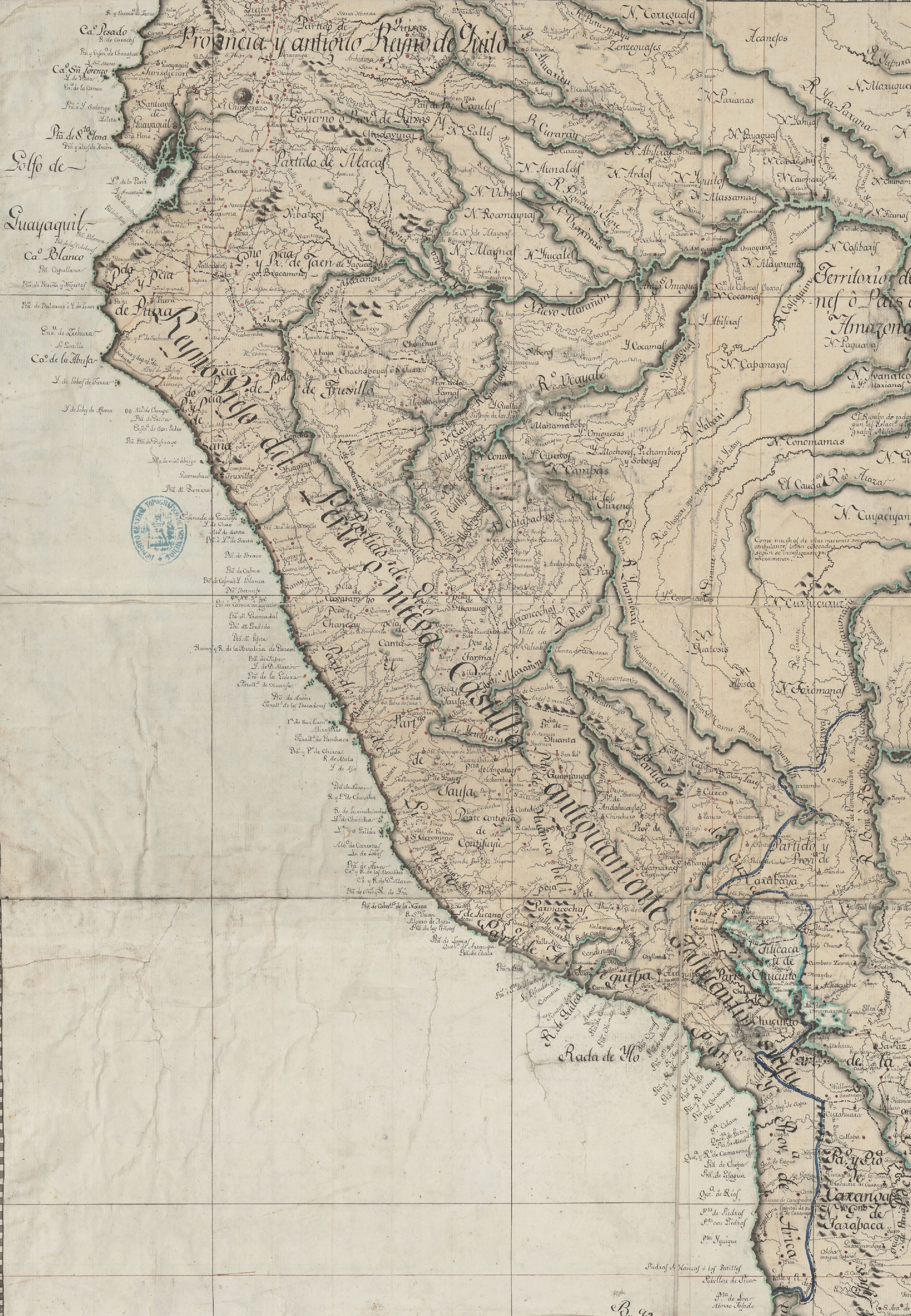
The Viceroyalty of Peru on the South America map made by Agustín Ibáñez y Bojons in 1800.

Viceroy José Fernando de Abascal y Sousa promoted educational reforms, reorganized the army, and stamped out local rebellions. During his administration, the Inquisition of Lima was temporarily abolished as a result of the reforms taken by the Cortes in Spain.

From the beginning of the 19th century, revolutionary uprisings erupted in Spanish America. Viceroy José Fernando de Abascal y Sousa made the Viceroyalty of Peru the stronghold, redoubt, and center of the counter-revolution in favor of the monarchy; from this viceroyalty, the advance of the Argentine War of Independence was contained, Chile was reconquered, and the uprisings in Quito were suppressed. All revolutionary attempts, particularly the Cuzco Rebellion of 1814, and any manifestation of independence movements within the viceroyalty itself were also repressed. However, Guayaquil proclaimed itself an independent state in 1820 and received support from Gran Colombia under General Simón Bolívar.

Abascal reincorporated the provinces of Córdoba, Potosí, La Paz, Charcas, Rancagua and Quito into the Viceroyalty of Peru. The Royal Army of Peru during 14 years defeated the patriots armies of Argentinians and Chileans, turning Peru into the last royal bastion in South America. Additionally, in 1812, a large fire in Guayaquil destroyed approximately half of the city.

Lord Cochrane unsuccessfully attacked Guayaquil and Callao, but on 4 February he captured Valdivia, called at the time The Key of the South Seas and the Gibraltar of the Pacific, due to its huge fortifications. The viceroyalty managed to defend Chiloé Island until 1826.

On September 8, 1820, the Expedición Libertadora of Peru, organized mainly by the Chilean government with the objective of executing previous plans laid out by Argentine libertador José de San Martín, landed on the beach at Paracas Bay near the city of Pisco, with the land army under the command of José de San Martín and the navy under the command of Thomas Cochrane. After Cochrane's navy defeated the Spanish navy on the Peruvian coasts, the expedition secured the surrender of Callao. After fruitless negotiations with the viceroy, the expedition occupied the Peruvian capital of Lima on July 21, 1821. The independence of Peru was proclaimed on July 28, 1821. Viceroy José de la Serna e Hinojosa, still in command of a sizable military force, retired to Jauja, and later to Cusco.

On July 26, 1822, San Martín and Simón Bolívar met in Guayaquil to define a strategy for the liberation of the rest of Peru. The meeting was secret, and exactly what occurred is not known. However, afterwards San Martín returned to Argentina while Bolívar prepared to launch an offensive against the remaining royalist forces in Peru and Upper Peru (modern-day Bolivia). In September 1823 Bolívar arrived in Lima with Antonio José de Sucre to plan the offensive.

In February 1824 the royalists briefly regained control of Lima. Olañeta's Rebellion started by surprise and the entire royalist army of Upper Peru (today's Bolivia) revolted, led by the royalist commander Pedro Antonio Olañeta against José de la Serna, the liberal viceroy of Peru. This broke the royal army and started a civil war in Upper Peru. Having regrouped in Trujillo, Bolívar in June led his rebel forces South to confront the Spanish under Field Marshal José de Canterac. The two armies met on the plains of Junín on August 6, 1824, and the Peruvians were victorious in a battle fought entirely without firearms. The Spanish troops subsequently evacuated Lima for a second time. As a result of a decree of the Congress of Gran Colombia, Bolívar turned over command of the rebel troops to Sucre on October 7, 1824.

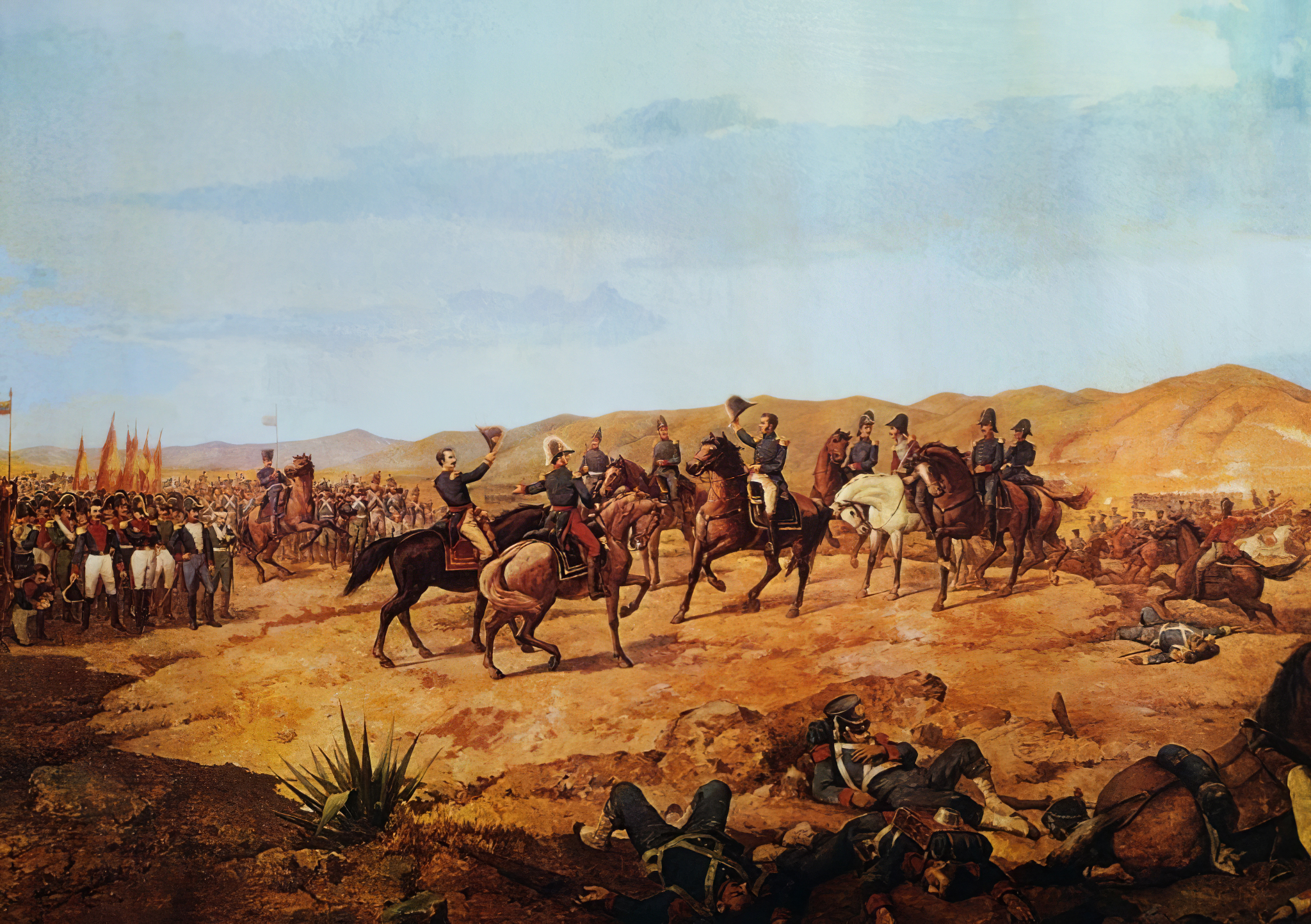
The Battle of Ayacucho

At this point, royalist control was reduced to Cusco in the south-central highlands. The viceroy launched a counter-offensive over Ayacucho, and on 9 December 1824. The Battle of Ayacucho (also known as the Battle of La Quinua), took place between royalist Spanish and nationalist (republican) troops at Pampa de La Quinua, a few kilometers away from Ayacucho, near the town of Quinua.

This battle, led by Bolívar's lieutenant Antonio José de Sucre, sealed the independence of Peru and South America. During this battle, the losing Spanish army sustained 2,000 dead and wounded and lost 3,000 prisoners, with the remainder of the army entirely dispersed. During the battle, Viceroy Serna was wounded and taken prisoner, where he signed the final capitulation whereby the Spaniards agreed to leave Peru. Serna was released soon afterwards and sailed for Europe.

Spain made futile attempts to retain its former territories, such as at the Siege of Callao (1826), but after death of King Ferdinand VII of Spain in 1836, the government of Spain renounced its territorial and sovereignty claims over all of continental America. In 1867, Spain signed a peace treaty with Peru and in 1879 it signed a treaty recognizing Peru's independence.

== Politics ==
The town of Lima, founded by Pizarro on January 18, 1535, as the "Ciudad de los Reyes" (City of the Kings/Magi), became the seat of the new viceroyalty. As the seat of a viceroy, who had oversight over all of Spanish South America except for Portuguese-dominated Brazil, Lima grew into a powerful city. During the 16th, 17th and most of the 18th centuries, all of the colonial wealth of South America created by the silver mines passed through Lima on its way to the Isthmus of Panama and from there to Seville, Spain.

The rest of the viceroyalty was administratively dependent upon Lima, in a pattern that persists until today in Peru. By the start of the 18th century, Lima had become a distinguished and aristocratic colonial capital, seat of the 250-year-old Royal and Pontifical University of San Marcos and the chief Spanish stronghold in the Americas.

The audiencia subdivisions of the Viceroyalty of Peru c. 1650, as numbered in the article. (Note: For two, somewhat different interpretations of the boundaries in unsettled areas, see Burkholder, Mark A. and Lyman L. Johnson. Colonial Latin America (10 editions). (New York: Oxford University Press, 1990), Map 2, 73 ISBN 0-19-506110-1; and Lombardi, Cathryn L., John V. Lombardi and K. Lynn Stoner. Latin American History: A Teaching Atlas. (Madison: The University of Wisconsin Press, 1983), 29. ISBN 0-299-09714-5.)

At ground level during the first century, Spanish encomenderos depended on local chieftains (curacas) to gain access to the Indian population's tribute labor, even the most remote settlements, and therefore, many encomenderos developed reciprocal, if still hierarchical, relationships with the curacas. By the end of the 16th century the quasi-private encomienda had been replaced by the repartimiento system (known in Peru by the Quechua term, mita), which was controlled by local crown officials.

Politically the viceroyalty was further divided into audiencias, which were primarily superior tribunals, but which also had administrative and legislative functions. Each of these was responsible to the Viceroy of Peru in administrative matters (though not in judicial ones). Audiencias further incorporated the older, smaller divisions known as "governorships" (gobernaciones, roughly provinces) headed by a governor. (See, Adelantado.) Provinces which were under military threat were grouped into captaincies general, such as the Captaincy General of Chile (established in 1541 and established as a Bourbon captaincy general in 1789), and which were joint military and political commands with a certain level of autonomy. The viceroy was captain-general of the provinces which remained directly under his command.

At the local level there were hundreds of districts, in both Indian and Spanish areas, which were headed by either a corregidor (also known as an alcalde mayor) or a cabildo (town council), both of which had judicial and administrative powers. In the late 18th century the Bourbon dynasty began phasing out the corregidores and introduced intendants, whose broad fiscal powers cut into the authority of the viceroys, governors and cabildos. (See Bourbon Reforms.)

=== Audiencias ===
With dates of creation:

1. Panama (1st one, 1538–43), (2nd one, 1564–1751)*
2. Santa Fe de Bogotá (1548)*
3. Quito (1563)*
4. Lima (1543)
5. La Plata de los Charcas (1559)†
6. Santiago de Chile (1563–73; 1606)

Later Audiencias

- Buenos Aires (1661–72; 1776)†
- Cusco (1787)

*Later part of the Viceroyalty of New Granada
†Later part of the Viceroyalty of the Río de la Plata

=== Autonomous Captaincy General ===
1. Chile (1789)

=== Intendancies ===
Listed under year of creation:

1783
1. Lima, 2. Puno

1784
3. Trujillo, 4. Tarma, 5. Huancavelica, 6. Cuzco, 7. Arequipa, (10. Chiloé, abolished in 1789)

1786
8. Santiago, 9. Concepción

== Economy ==
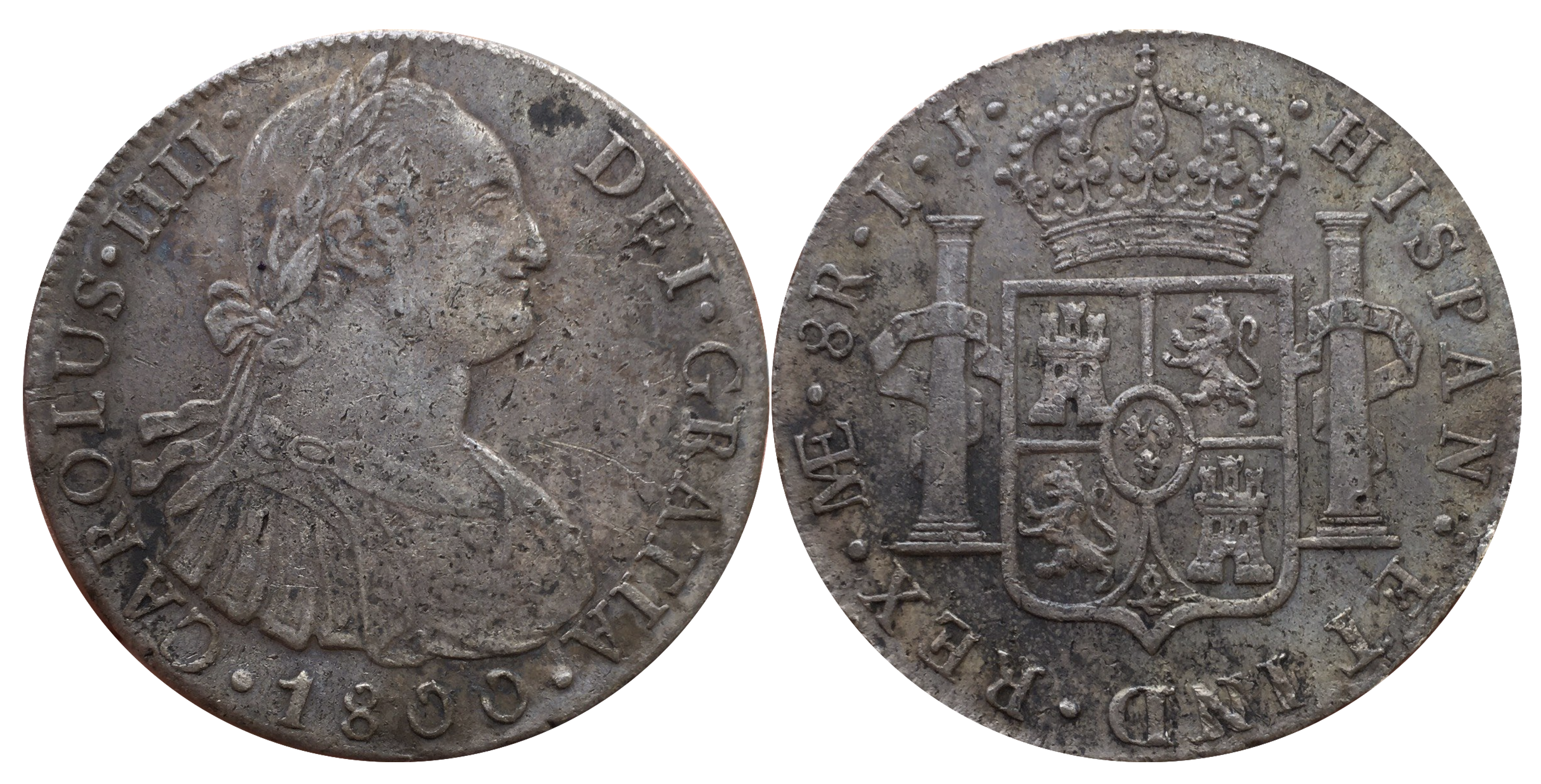
Silver coin: 8 reales Carlos IV, Viceroyalty of Peru – 1800

The economy of the viceroyalty of Peru largely depended on the export of silver. The huge amounts of silver exported from the viceroyalty of Peru and Mexico deeply affected Europe, where some scholars believe it caused the so-called price revolution. Silver mining was carried out using contract and free wage labourers, as well as the mita system of unfree labour, a system inherited from pre-Hispanic times. Silver production peaked in 1610. Once the Viceroyalty of Peru was established, gold and silver from the Andes enriched the conquerors, and the viceroyalty became the principal source of Spanish wealth and power in South America.

The best mines, due to their quality and yield, were owned by the Spanish Crown. Smaller mines, on the other hand, were exploited by private individuals who were obligated to pay the Royal Fifth as a tax, that is, one-fifth of the wealth obtained. The main mining centers were: Castrovirreyna, Huancavelica, Cerro de Pasco, Cajabamba, Contumazá, Carabaya, Caylloma, and Hualgayoc, all located in present-day Peru. But the largest mining center was Potosí, whose production was based on the mita system of forced labor. Cerro Rico of Potosí provided two-thirds of the silver produced in Peru until 1776, when it became part of the Viceroyalty of the Río de la Plata. The mine became the largest silver mine in the world, and the city of Potosí grew to a population of over 200,000, making it the largest city in the America's between the 16th and 17th century.

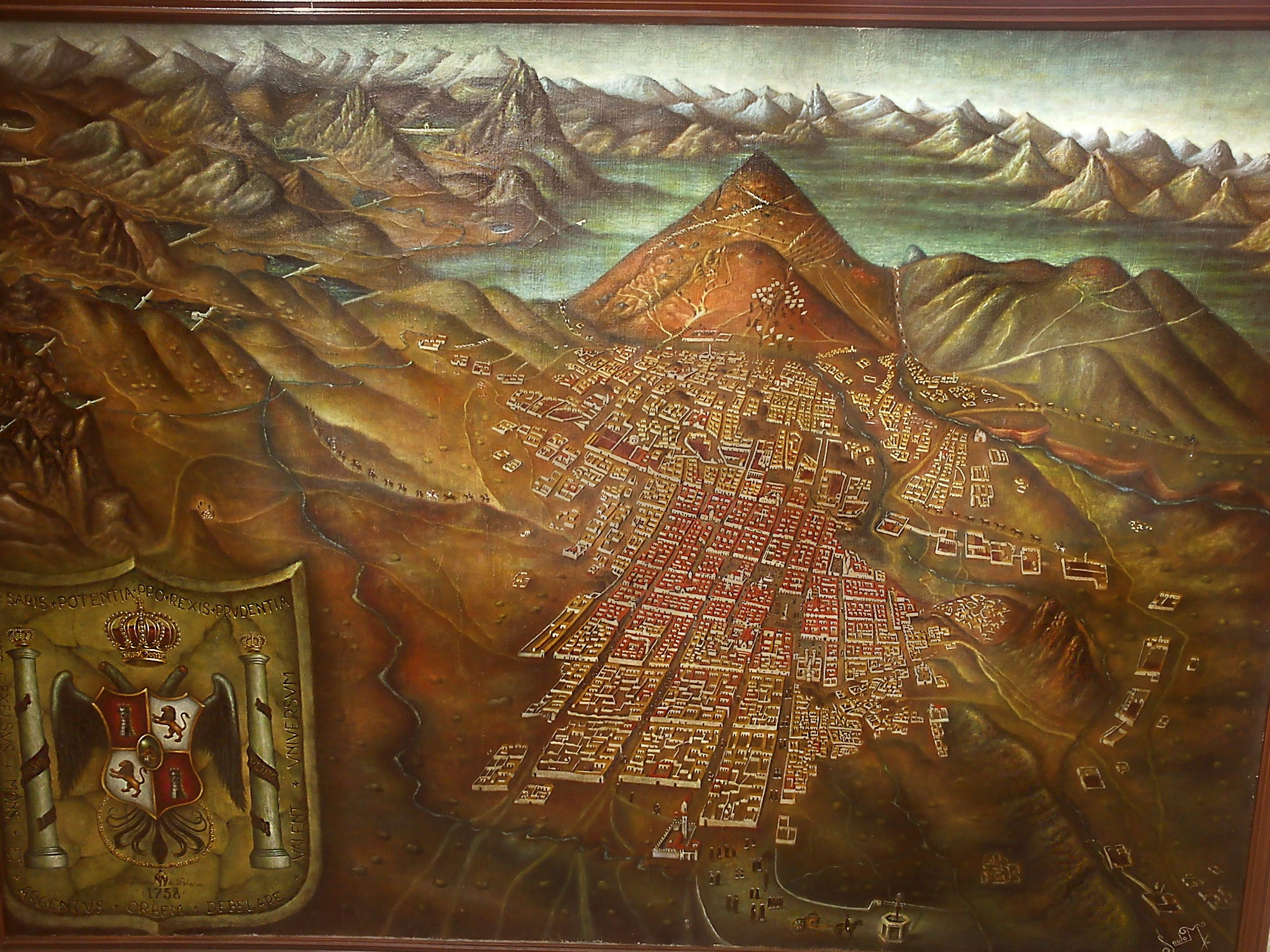
Panoramic painting of Potosí in 1758, by Gasper de Berrio.

The mining centers were cities that quickly became commercial hubs, forming a complex trade network that included Mexico City (for Zacatecas and Guanajuato) and Lima (for Potosí, Cerro de Pasco, and Huancavelica). Andean techniques for extracting silver included the huayra method, which involved using a furnace to melt lead and extract the silver. However, this silver was noticeably impure. In New Spain, a technique was discovered and applied in the Potosí mines: it consisted of mixing silver with mercury (called quicksilver). The silver was then separated, maintaining its purity.

While most of the silver from the viceroyalty ended up in Europe some circulated within South America. Indeed, the Real Situado was an annual payment of silver from the viceroyalty to finance the permanent Spanish army in Chile that which fought a prolonged conflict known as Arauco War. The Spanish in turn traded part of this silver with Mapuches giving origin to a tradition of Mapuche silverwork. Another issue that burdened the finances of the viceroyalty was the maintenance of the Valdivian Fort System built in response to the Dutch expedition to Valdivia in 1643. Luis Jerónimo Fernández de Cabrera prohibited direct trade between Peru and New Spain and the persecution of Portuguese Jews, the principal traders in Lima.

Initially, during the conquest of Peru, there was no currency for trade. Later, the first form of currency appeared in Peru: the callana, a rudimentary piece cast with a specified weight and fineness, which circulated in Cajamarca, Lima, Cuzco, and Piura. Subsequently, the peso was minted a roughly chiseled disc with a cross on each side; its value was 450 Maravedí. The first coins minted for Peru and South America appeared between 1568 and 1570. Viceroy Manuel de Oms y de Santa Pau sent back an enormous sum of money (1,600,000 pesos) to the king to cover some of the costs of the War of the Spanish Succession. This was possible in part because of the discovery of the mines in Carabaya province.

Beginning in 1633 the Spanish crown allowed for the purchase of high-ranking offices, which led to an increase of power of the local elites and a diminishing efficiency in administration given that local officials were less skilled compared with those from Spain appointed by the crown. This was also a source of increased corruption in the viceroyalty.

== Demographics ==
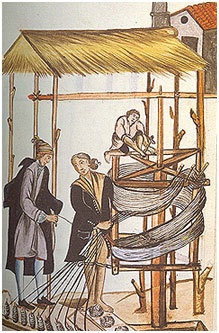
18th century watercolor depicting a workshop in the Viceroyalty.

A census taken by the last Quipucamayoc indicated that there were 12 million inhabitants of Inca Peru; 45 years later, under viceroy Toledo, the census figures amounted to only 1,100,000 Indians. While the attrition was not an organized attempt at genocide, the results were similar, largely resulting from smallpox and other Eurasian diseases to which the natives had no immunity.

Inca cities were given Spanish Christian names and rebuilt as Spanish towns, each centered around a plaza with a church or cathedral facing an official residence. A few Inca cities like Cusco retained native masonry for the foundations of their walls. Other Inca sites, like Huanuco Viejo, were abandoned for cities at lower altitudes more hospitable to the Spanish.

Viceroy José de Armendáriz reestablished the system whereby Inca nobles who could prove their ancestry were recognized as hijosdalgos of Castile. This led to a frenzy on the part of the Indigenous nobility to legitimate their status.

In the 1790s, Viceroy Francisco Gil de Taboada ordered the first official census of the population, which counted the population of about 1,500,000 inhabitants.

The last cargo of black slaves in Peru was landed in 1806. At that time, an adult male slave sold for 600 pesos.

== Arts and culture ==
The city of Lima played a leading role in the development of art in the Viceroyalty of Peru. Its rapid urban growth, the accumulation of wealth by the encomenderos, and the construction of temples and churches fueled the demand for paintings and sculptures from the main cities of the Spanish kingdoms. Works from Flanders and Italy were particularly favored, although Sevillian and Andalusian pieces were also in high demand.

=== Art ===
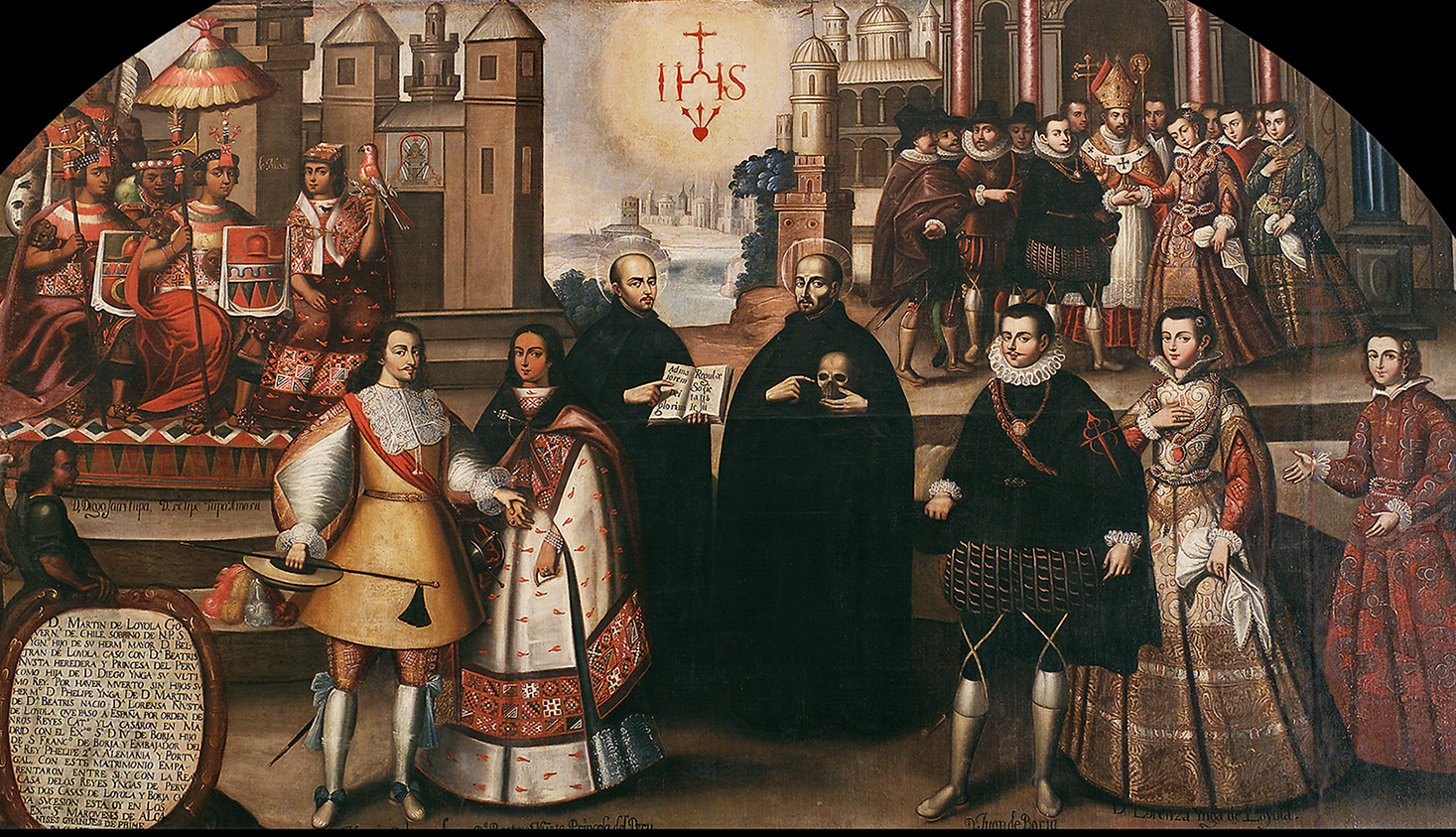
Marriage of Martín García de Loyola and Sayri Túpac's daughter, Beatriz Clara Qoya, between the Inca royal family and Spanish priests. 1718 painting from the Cusco school.

In the early stages of the viceroyalty, painting received, in addition to the obvious Spanish influence, a distinct Italian influence due to the arrival of many Italian artists in Peru. The first Italian to arrive was the Jesuit Bernardo Bitti, who, from 1575 onward, disseminated his work throughout the viceroyalty, even though his workshop was located in Lima. Bitti's arrival marked the peak of Italian Renaissance influence in the viceroyalty. Alongside the Jesuit master Bernardo Bitti, Matteo Pérez and Angelino Medoro stand out within the Italian school that arrived in Peru.

In the 17th century mestizo style of painting emerged, its greatest expression undoubtedly occurring in Cusco, which became one of the most important artistic centers of the viceroyalty. The presence of Bernardo Bitti in Cusco had a profound impact on Cusco's art scene. However, although the "Italian movement" served as a foundation for many of the works produced in this city, it is true that elements of the region began to be abandoned and incorporated. In other words, over the years a distinct personality and language developed, reflecting the personalities of the painters and their sources of inspiration, thus giving rise to the style known as the Cusco school of painting, characterized by its vibrant colors and the rich detail of its portraits and frames. Its main representatives were: Diego Quispe Tito, Basilio Santa Cruz Pumacallao, and Marcos Zapata; although most of the works of this school are by anonymous artists, they were the true promoters of the Cusco current because they added elements of the local culture to their work.

During the 18th century, Peru continued to produce Baroque paintings with a strong Spanish influence. However, art was no longer the exclusive domain of the Church. The viceregal court and the nobility gained access to painting through portraits. These paintings were more festive and employed a much more elaborate pictorial language than those of the previous century. The paintings of Cristóbal de Lozano and Cristóbal de Aguilar are the most famous, as they portrayed the most important viceroys of The Enlightenment.

=== Architecture ===
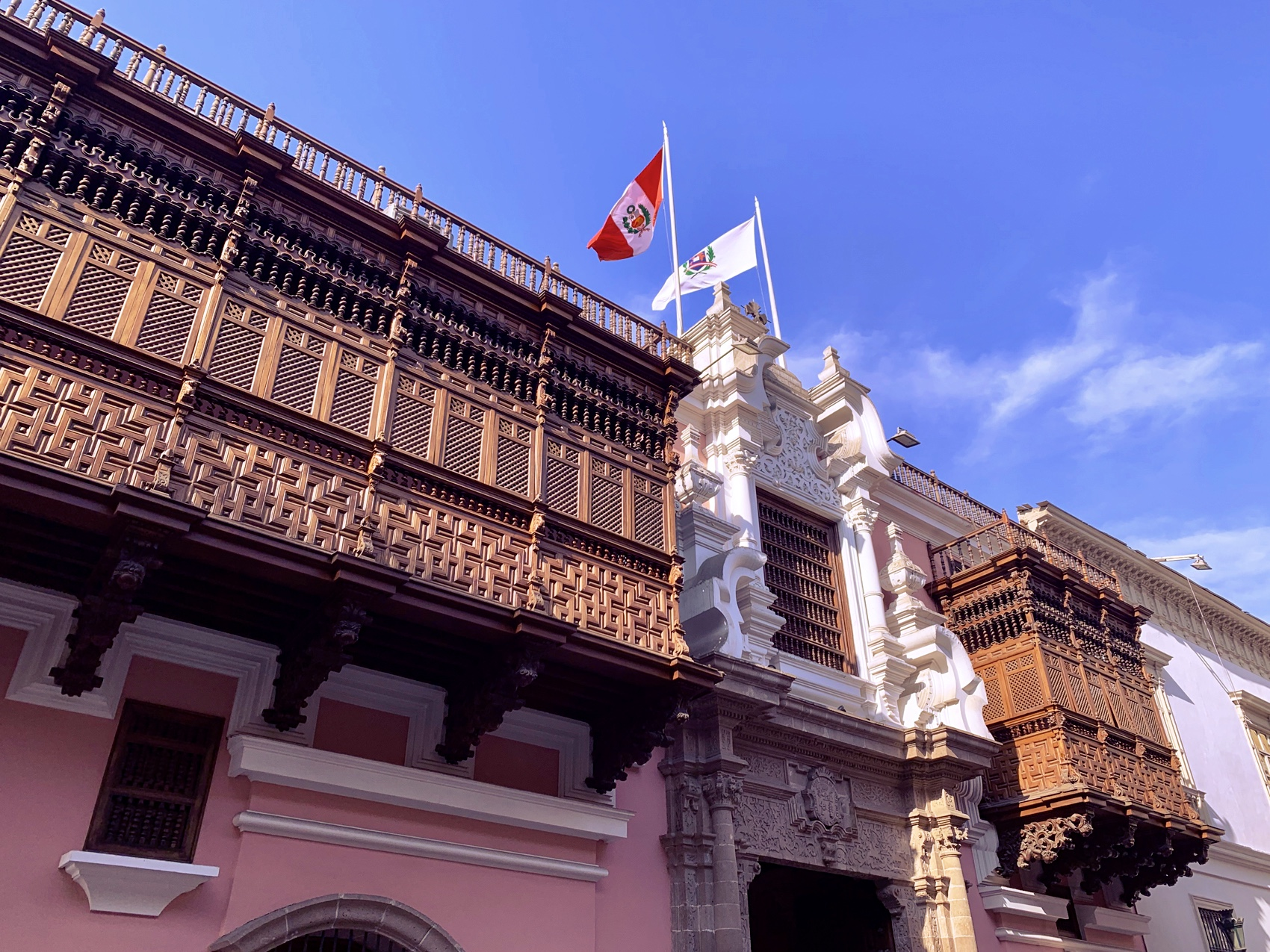
Palacio de Torre Tagle and its iconic balconies seen throughout Lima and other cities of the Viceroyalty, constructed in 1735.

Viceregal architecture reached its peak in the construction of churches, cloisters, houses, and stately mansions, and to a lesser extent, fortresses and barracks. Its development was primarily driven by religious activity, which led to the construction of cathedrals, cloisters, and urban and rural convents scattered throughout the country. Most churches from the late 16th century had a Gothic floor plan with an elongated nave separated by a presbytery or main chapel and a large arch known as a triumphal arch. However, few examples of 16th century architecture remain. Some courtyard houses in Lima and Cusco, and certain churches in the provinces, are the only surviving examples of constructions from that period. The 17th century brought a Baroque style of architecture. Under French influence, Rococo architecture grew in the 18th and 19th century.

In the cities, housing was strongly influenced by the Iberian Peninsula, especially Andalusia. Houses were typically one or two stories high, with a vestibule at the entrance. This vestibule was usually open all day, as it was used by street vendors and visitors. The balconies of Lima gave that city its own personality, since in no other American city were there as many balconies as in the capital of the Viceroyalty of Peru.

=== Literature ===
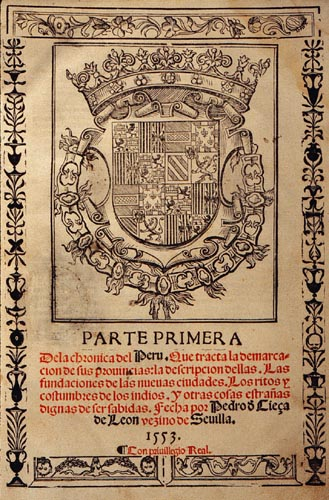
First page of the Chrónica del Perú by Pedro Cieza de León in 1553.

The earliest literary expressions of viceregal Peru were markedly influenced by the Renaissance and Italy, manifested in refined Greco-Latin models in prose and verse (reflecting aristocratic taste). Later, the flourishing of Spanish literature between the 16th and 17th centuries, the so-called Golden Age, exerted its influence on Peruvian letters, but its characteristics, when fused with the spirit of viceregal Peru, yielded results that have brought prestige to mestizo literature. The most notable writers from the Viceroyalty include, Inca Garcilaso de la Vega, Juan de Espinosa Medrano, Antonio de León Pinelo, Pedro Peralta y Barnuevo, Amarilis and Pedro de Oña.

The first books printed in Peru were produced by Antonio Ricardo, a printer from Turin who settled in Lima. Diego de Benavides y de la Cueva built the first theater in Lima. Manuel de Oms y de Santa Pau founded a literary academy in 1709 and promoted weekly literary discussions in the palace that attracted some of Lima's best writers. These included the famous Criollo scholar Pedro Peralta y Barnuevo and several Indigenous poets. Oms introduced French and Italian fashions in the viceroyalty. The Italian musician Rocco Cerruti arrived in Peru. Francisco Gil de Taboada supported the foundation of the newspaper El Mercurio Peruano in 1791 and founded the Academy of Fine Arts.

== Education ==
Education in the Viceroyalty of Peru was subject to European models and was characterized by rote learning, religiosity, rigor, and classicism. The Church, through its religious orders, particularly the Jesuits, exerted a significant influence and played a major role in shaping it. Basic education was provided through convent schools, parish schools, and mission schools. There, children were taught to read, write, sing, and learn basic religious principles. Women were almost entirely excluded from the educational process. Intermediate education took place schools for Caciques. Higher education proper was offered in universities. University education in Peru began in 1551 with the founding of the National University of San Marcos in Lima, by the Dominicans. It is the oldest institution of higher education on the American continent and the first university in America to be officially and solemnly constituted, that is, with all the royal and canonical formalities required at the time.

Viceroy Francisco de Borja y Aragón reorganized the University of San Marcos and Luis Jerónimo Fernández de Cabrera founded two chairs of medicine. In the 1710s, Viceroy Diego Ladrón de Guevara established a chair of anatomy. Teodoro de Croix and Francisco Gil de Taboada founded anatomy centers. In 1810 the medical school of San Fernando was founded.

Luis Enríquez de Guzmán, 9th Count of Alba de Liste founded the Naval Academy of the colony. Francisco Gil de Taboada supported the navigation school. Teodoro de Croix began the Botanic Garden of Lima.

Francisco de Borja y Aragón also founded, in Cusco, the Colegio del Príncipe for sons of the Indigenous nobility and the Colegio de San Francisco for sons of the conquistadors. Manuel de Amat y Juniet founded the Royal College of San Carlos.

On the death of the Peruvian astronomer Doctor Francisco Ruiz Lozano, Viceroy Melchor Liñán y Cisneros (with the approval of the Crown) gave mathematics a permanent position in the University of San Marcos. Mathematics was attached to the chair of cosmography. Doctor Juan Ramón Koening, a Belgian by birth, was named to the chair.. Viceroy Manuel de Guirior created two new chairs at the university.

== Religion ==
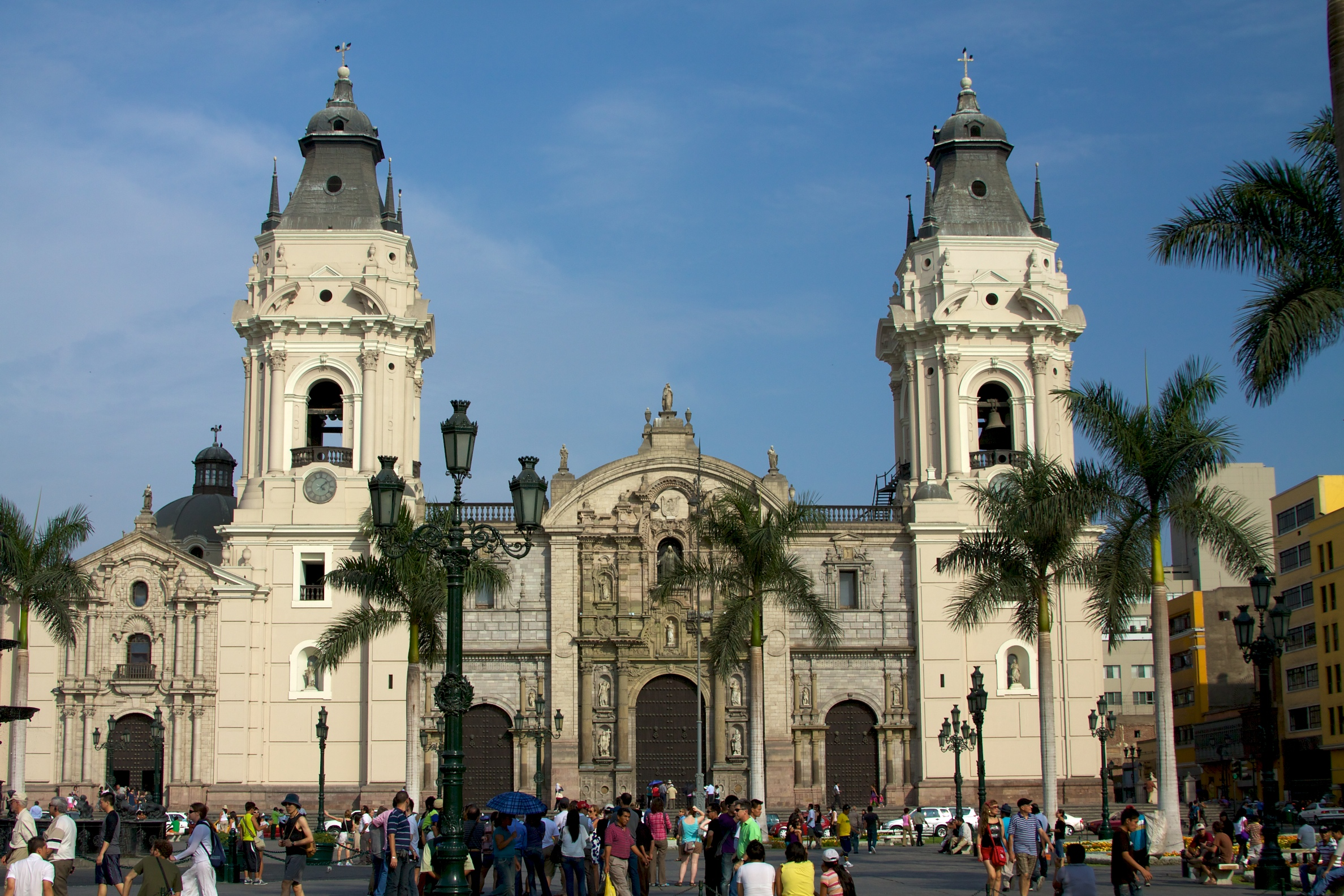
Metropolitan Cathedral of Lima

One of the causes of the discovery of America was the spread of the Catholic Church, and since the creation of the Peruvian viceroyalty, society has been characterized by professing Catholicism and possessing a deep religious spirit.

In the 17th century, the Catholic Church prospered enormously: in Lima, with 26,000 inhabitants, it had nineteen churches and monasteries and ten percent of its population consisted of priests, canons, friars and nuns, who penetrated deeply into the life of the people, in whose families it was almost a traditional attitude to dedicate one of the children to religious life and to rigorously observe the Angelus prayers at noon and the rosary, in addition to attending the various worship activities.

After the founding of Lima, a diocese was established in 1541, which, in 1548, was elevated to the status of Archdiocese during the administration of Pedro de la Gasca. This archdiocese had jurisdiction over all the other diocese then operating in South America, The first archbishop was Friar Jerónimo de Loayza, until Friar Turibius of Mogrovejo was appointed archbishop in 1581. Mogrovejo is considered the true organizer of the ecclesiastical system in the viceroyalty, and to this end, he convened two provincial councils in Lima. Accordingly, the Peruvian church was organized into archdiocese's, diocese's, and parishes.

In 1671, Rose of Lima was canonized by Pope Clement X. Rose was the first native-born American to become a Catholic saint, being born in 1586. Pope Benedict XIII elevated another two important Peruvian saints, Toribio Alfonso de Mogrovejo and Francisco de Solano. Martin de Porres, born in 1579, was canonized by Pope John XXIII in 1962, becoming the first Catholic saint of color in the Americas.

== Science ==
In 1737, Jorge Juan y Santacilia and Antonio de Ulloa, Spanish scientists sent by the French Academy on a scientific mission to measure a degree of meridian arc at the equator, arrived in the colony. They also had the mission of reporting on disorganization and corruption in the government and smuggling. Their report was published later, under the title Noticias Secretas de América (Secret News From America).

Manuel de Guirior assisted the scientific expedition of Hipólito Ruiz López, José Antonio Pavón and Joseph Dombey, sent to study the flora of the viceroyalty. The expedition lasted from 1777 to 1788. Their findings were later published as La flora peruana y chilena (The Flora of Peru and Chile). Again a major concern was stimulating the economy, which Guirior did by adopting liberal measures in agriculture, mining, commerce and industry.

Another French influence on science in the colony was Louis Godin, another member of the meridian expedition. He was appointed cosmógrafo mayor by Viceroy Mendoza. The duties of cosmógrafo mayor included publishing almanacs and sailing instructions. Another French scientist in Peru at this time was Charles Marie de La Condamine.

The Balmis Expedition arrived in Lima on May 23, 1806. At the same time these viceroys adopted rigorous measures to suppress the thought of the Encyclopedists and revolutionaries in the United States and France.

== See also ==
- History of Peru
- Peruvian Viceroyal architecture
- Inca architecture
- Colonialism
- List of Viceroys of Peru
- Spanish conquest of the Muisca
- Spanish colonization of the Americas
- Spanish Empire
- Viceroyalty of New Spain
- Kuraka
- Criollo people
