= Real Audiencia of Cusco =

The Real Audiencia of Cusco was the highest court of the Spanish Crown in the Cusco region of the Viceroyalty of Peru between 1787 and 1825. Prior to the creation of this Real Audiencia, jurisdiction over this territory was divided between the Audiencias of Charcas and Lima.

== Creation ==
Requests suggesting the creation of a Royal Audiencia for the Peruvian highlands dated back to the 17th century, and were requested to the King and the Council of the Indies by Jesuit clergymen and local authorities, as it had become difficult to appeal to the authorities in Lima or Charcas.

Its creation, far from being an initiative of the Spanish authorities, was a consequence of the bloody Rebellion of Túpac Amaru II (1780-1783), which led Secretary of State for the Indies, José de Gálvez, to convince King Charles III to implement its creation in order to improve the government of Peru.

On 26 February 1787, by Royal Decree, King Charles III of Spain ordered the establishment of the Royal Audiencia and Chancery of Cusco.

== Territory ==
The districts of Carabaya, Lampa, and Azángaro, belonging to the Intendancy of Puno, which had been created in 1784 within the Viceroyalty of the Río de la Plata, were included within its territory. On 1 February 1796, the Intendency of Puno also came under the jurisdiction of the Viceroyalty of Peru, and the districts of Paucarcolla and Chucuito, which until then had belonged to the Real Audiencia of Charcas, also came under the jurisdiction of the Audiencia of Cusco.

== Independence of Peru ==
In 1821, because General José de San Martín had seized Lima and abolished the Real Audiencia of Lima, the unoccupied Intendancy of Arequipa was added to the jurisdiction of the Royal Audiencia of Cuzco, remaining so until the end of the viceroyalty in 1825. After the Capitulation of Ayacucho, the members of the Royal Audiencia of Cusco, the last bastion of Cusco Royalism, appointed Marshal Don Pío de Tristán as the new Viceroy of Peru. The Audiencia was definitively dissolved in 1825 after the final fall of the viceroyalty system.

== Presidents ==
- 1784-1788 : Benito de la Mata Linares
- 1788-1791 : José de la Portilla
- 1791-1792 : Carlos de Corral
- 1794-1806 : Manuel Ruiz Urriés de Castilla
- 1806-1809 : Francisco Muñoz de San Clemente
- 1810-1812 : José Manuel de Goyeneche
- 1811-1812 : Pedro Antonio Cernadas
- 1812-1812 : Martín de la Concha y Jara
- 1812-1813 : Mateo Pumacahua
- 1814-1814 : Manuel Pardo Ribadeneira
- 1815-1815 : Manuel González de Bernedo
- 1816-1816 : Mariano Ricafort
- 1817-1824 : Pío Tristán
