= Intendancy of Arequipa =

Intendancy of the Spanish Empire

Intendencia de Arequipa
- Intendancy of the Spanish Empire
- 1784–1824
- Coat of arms

- The intendancy within Peru in 1810
- Capital: Arequipa
- Government
- Intendant
  - 1784–1786: José Menéndez (first)
  - 1816–1824: Juan Bautista (last)
- Historical era: Viceroyalty of Peru
  - Established: 1784
  - Dissolved: December 1824
- Subdivisions
  - Type: Partidos
  - Units: See relevant section
Succeeded by
Department of Arequipa

The Intendancy of Arequipa (Spanish: Intendencia de Arequipa), also known informally as Arequipa Province (Spanish: Provincia de Arequipa), was one of the territorial divisions of the Viceroyalty of Peru, ruled from the city of Arequipa and under the jurisdiction of the Bishopric of Arequipa. It existed from 1784 to 1824, receiving the news of the result of the Battle of Ayacucho in late December of the same year.

== History ==
Created in 1784, the intendancy was under the jurisdiction of the Real Audiencia of Lima until the city's occupation by José de San Martín in the 1820s, when it was transferred to the Real Audiencia of Cuzco.

The intendancy was phased out starting on April 26, 1822, when the Department of Arequipa was created by José de San Martín as part of his new protectorate, with Francisco de Paula Otero as its leader. Despite this establishment, the patriot governments' armies of Peru, Colombia and Chile were subsequently defeated by the royalist troops of Valentín Ferraz y Barrau and Antonio Tur y Berrueta in the Battle of Arequipa of October 8, 1823. After the royalist capitulation at the Battle of Ayacucho on December 9, 1824, the news reached the intendancy later that month, with Pío de Tristán being chosen as interim viceroy until the Peruvian troops reached the city.

== Subdivisions ==
The intendancy was divided into seven partidos.

Partido	Head (city of government)
Arequipa	Ciudad de la Asunción de Nuestra Señora del Valle Hermoso de Arequipa
Cailloma	Caylloma
Condesuyos	Chuquibamba
Camaná	Villa de San Miguel de Ribera
Moquegua	Villa de Santa Catalina de Guadalcázar del Valle de Moquegua
Arica	Ciudad de San Marcos de Arica
Tarapacá	San Lorenzo de Tarapacá

== Intendants ==
The Governors (intendants) who ruled the intendancy of Arequipa were:

- José Menéndez Escalada, director general de Aduana (1784–1786)
- Antonio Alvarez y Jimenez, Brigadier (1786–1796)
- Bartolomé María Salamanca, Frigate captain of the Order of Alcántara (1796–1810)
- José Gabriel Moscoso, Lieutenant colonel (1810–1815)
- Pío de Tristán, Brigadier (1815–1816)
- Juan Bautista de Lavalle, Colonel of the Order of Alcántara (1816–1824)

== See also ==
- Department of Arequipa
