= Pedro Peralta y Barnuevo =

Pedro Peralta y Barnuevo (Lima, 26 November 1663 – 30 April 1743) was an Enlightenment-era Peruvian mathematician, cosmographer, historian, scholar, poet, and astronomer, and was considered a polymath. He was rector of University of San Marcos in Lima.

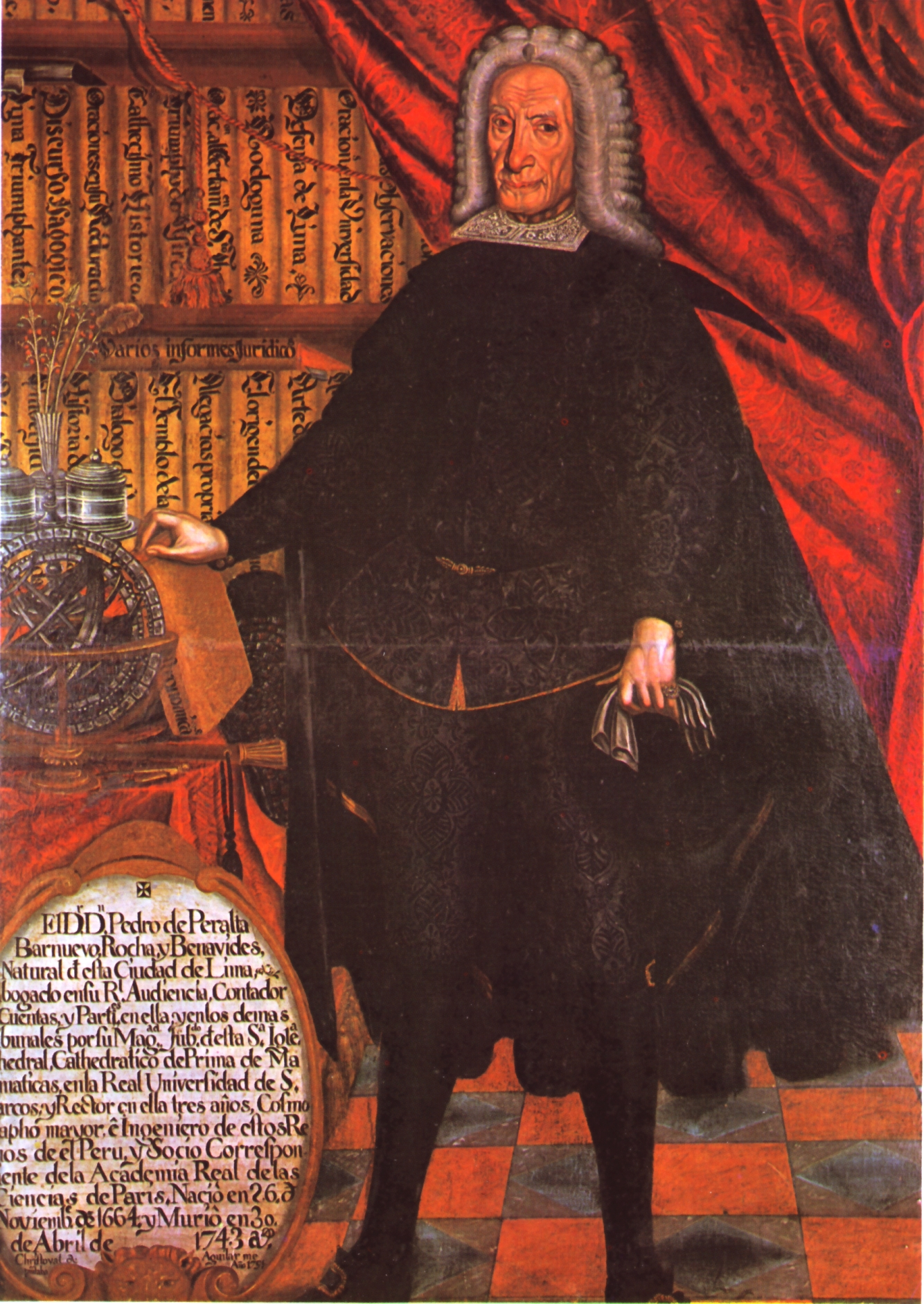
Pedro de Peralta y Branuevo

Peralta's parents were Spaniard Francisco Peralta Barnuevo and Magdalena E. Rocha Benavides from Lima. He was the brother of José de Peralta Barnuevo, Bishop of Buenos Aires.

He studied Roman and canonical art and law at the University of San Marcos, from which he obtained the degree of doctor in canons and laws (1680-1686). Subsequently, he obtained the title of lawyer before the Royal Court (1686). He mastered Latin, Greek, French, Portuguese, Italian, English and Quechua, and had in his library works that reveal an all-embracing curiosity: grammar, poliorcetics, astronomy and metallurgy, among others. Upon the death of his father, he inherited from him the position of royal accountant of the Court of Audit. He also received income from his wife's landed estates.

He became rector of the University of San Marcos in very difficult circumstances for the university in 1715 and 1716. He was a member of the Académie des sciences of Paris, because of his decision to collaborate in a very important Franco-Spanish geodesic expedition, and the head of the expedition, begun in 1735, was the French naturalist and geographer Charles Marie de la Condamine. It was sought (and was done after long and very careful work), determine the length of the meridian arc, and numerous observations of the nature of that area were also carried out. Spaniards Antonio de Ulloa and Jorge Juan participated as principals.

== Works ==
- Oración que dixo el rector de esta Real Universidad de San Marcos a su ilustre claustro, el 30 de junio de 1716. Lima, 1716.
- Jubileos de Lima y fiestas reales. Lima, 1723.
- Historia de España Vindicada. Lima, 1730.
- Lima fundada o Conquista del Peru: poema heroico. Lima, 1732.
- Passion y triumpho de Christo: dividida en diez oraciones. Lima, 1738.
