= Real Audiencia of Lima =

Historical superior court in the empire of Spain

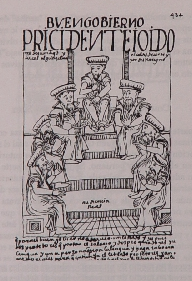
Facsimile of an engraving (depicting the justices of a Royal Audiencia) from the collection of the Supreme Court of Chile Library.

The Real Audiencia and Chancery of Lima (Spanish: Audiencia y Cancillería Real de Lima) was a superior court in the New World empire of Spain, located in the city of Lima, capital of the Viceroyalty of Peru. It was created on November 20, 1542 as was the viceroyalty itself, by the Emperor Charles V. The Audiencia began functioning in 1543 and initially had jurisdiction over the entire viceroyalty—virtually all of Spanish-controlled South America and Panama. Later other audiencias were established in the Viceroyalty. The Audiencia functioned until 1821 when the forces of José de San Martín entered Lima.

== Subsequent divisions ==
In 1559 part of the territory of the Lima Audiencia was separated and given over to a new Audiencia of Charcas, and in 1563 an Audiencia of Quito was established with jurisdiction over the northern territories of the viceroyalty. By the time the Recopilación de Leyes de Indias was published in 1680, the territory of the Lima Audiencia was defined in Law V of Title 15 as:

In the City of the Kings Lima, head of the provinces of Peru, shall reside another of our Royal Audiencias and Chancellery, with a viceroy, governor and captain general and lieutenant ours, who shall be president; eight judges of civil cases [oidores]; four judges of criminal cases [alcaldes del crimen]; and two crown attorneys [fiscales], one for civil cases and one for criminal ones; a bailiff [alguacil mayor]; a lieutenant of the Gran Chancellor; and the other necessary ministers and officials; and which shall have for district the coast from said city until the Kingdom of Chile exclusive, and until the Port of Paita inclusive; and inland to San Miguel de Piura, Cajamarca, Chachapoyas, Moyobamba and Los Motilones, inclusive and until El Collao, exclusive, along the borders determined for the Royal Audiencia of la Plata, and the City of Cusco and its [dependencies], inclusive, sharing borders in the north with the Royal Audiencia of Quito; in the south with the one of La Plata and in the west with the South Sea and in the east with undiscovered provinces, according to what is contained in, and pointed out, in Law 14 of this title.
