= Alonso de Sotomayor =

Spanish general

Don Alonso de Sotomayor Caballero de Santiago
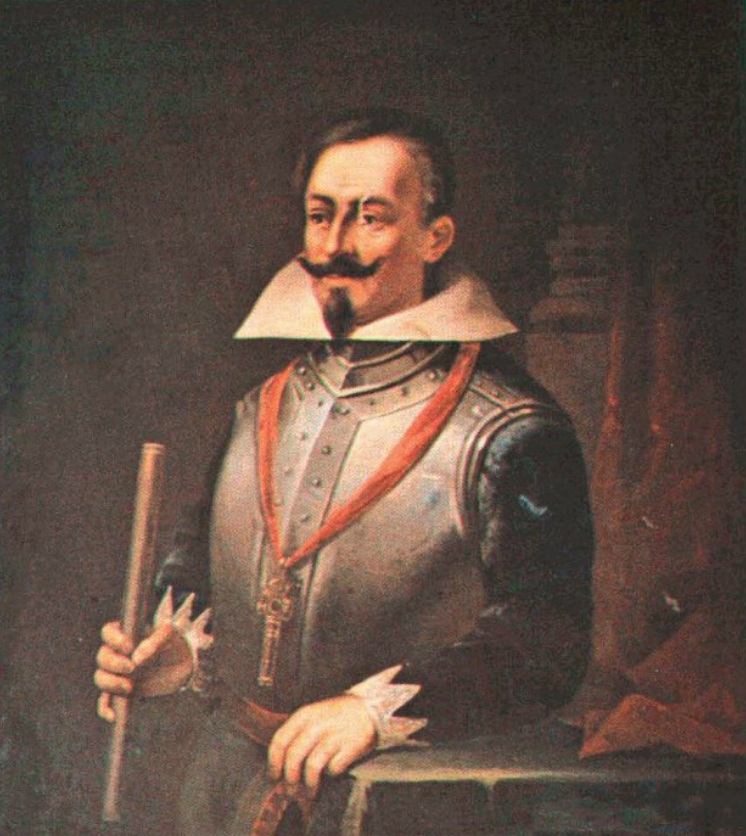

Royal Governor of Chile
- In office 1583–1592
- Monarch: King Philip II
- Preceded by: Martín Ruiz de Gamboa
- Succeeded by: Pedro de Viscarra

Royal Governor of Panama
- In office 1596–1602
- Monarch: King Philip II
- Preceded by: Juan del Barrio
- Succeeded by: Hernando de Añazco

Personal details
- Born: c. 1545 Trujillo, Spain
- Died: 1610 (aged 64–65) Spain

Alonso de Sotomayor y Valmediano (Spanish pronunciation: [aˈlonso ðe sotomaˈʝoɾ]; 1545–1610) was a Spanish conquistador from Extremadura, and a Royal Governor of Chile.

== Early life ==
He was born in Trujillo, in the province of Extremadura, the son of Gutiérrez de Sotomayor e Hinojosa and Beatriz de Valmediano. At the age of 15 he joined the army, serving first in Italy until 1567, and then moving to Flanders.

In 1580 he was called back to Madrid by his official duties. King Philip II, seeing his military record, awarded him a knighthood in the Order of Santiago and sent him on a campaign against Portugal. However, at that time news arrived from Chile, where the Arauco War continued and reinforcements were needed. The king subsequently decided to name Sotomayor governor of the district and send him there with a large contingent of soldiers to resolve the situation.

== Governor of Chile ==
Sotomayor arrived in Chile in 1583 and found himself required to play the role of judge, hearing innumerable accusations against the previous governor Martín Ruiz de Gamboa. This previous governor had become extremely unpopular for a tax regime, the Tasa de Gamboa, which prohibited the payment of taxes by the Indians in the form of labor. Sotomayor was forced to arrest and imprison Gamboa in the government house at Santiago, from which he was released only after providing a bond. However, Sotomayor later absolved Gamboa and freed him entirely.

With these antecedents, Sotomayor's first decision was reestablishing the old system of labor levies, abolishing the Tasa de Gamboa and reinstituting the previous Tasa de Santillán, albeit with provisions to humanize the old system, with the goal of avoiding the excesses of the encomenderos against the Indians.

=== The Arauco war ===
Sotomayor wanted to extend the conquest of Chile in the style of Pedro de Valdivia, which is to say, by building a series of forts which would protect each other and the cities. However, carrying out this project required a professional army, and requests for such were turned down by the Spanish authorities, due to the general scarcity of resources in the area and of the Crown.

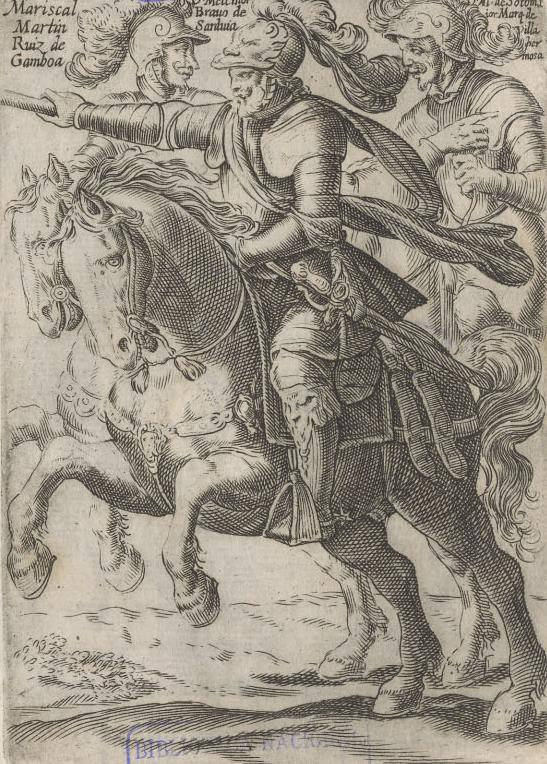
Alonso de Ovalle's 1646 engraving of Ruiz de Gamboa, Bravo de Saravia and Sotomayor

Instead he launched a number of campaigns against the resisting Mapuche Indians. He succeeded in capturing the mestizo Alonso Díaz, who had been a resistance leader for many years. Sotomayor sent his brother Luis to fight a campaign in the area around Valdivia, and succeeded in defeating the Mapuches in a surprise attack at Angol on January 16, 1585.

Sotomayor also put in action his plan of fortifications with the few men that he had. In 1584, he founded the fort of San Fabián de Conueo in Coelemu. In 1585 he ordered the construction of the fort Santo Arbol de la Cruz where the Guaqui River enters the Bio Bio River. He ordered the construction of a fort on each side of the Bio Bio River, the forts Espíritu Santo and Santísima Trinidad and another at a place in Catirai called San Jerónimo de Millapoa and raised another fort at Purén, where he also placed a small detachment. He raised these forts with the goal of cutting communications among the Mapuches and hoped to quickly establish towns in each of these places, which would attract enough people to bring reinforcements to Chile persuaded that this was the best method of reducing the tribes for the definitive conquest.

The Mapuche Toquis Nongoniel, Cadeguala and Guanoalca opposed the establishment of these forts, eventually forcing the abandonment of Purén in 1586. In 1589 Sotomayor reoccupied and expanded the fort of Puren and built a fort near the sea on the heights of Marihueñu and in 1590 he moved Arauco to its current location close to the sea.

However, his actions did not really weaken the Mapuches. The capture of Diaz didn't change the situation, and the establishment of the forts did not have any of their intended consequences. Instead, the Aracanians were every day better aqainted with the Spanish horses and weapons. The arquebus was their only problem, as they did not know how to use it and in any case did not have any source of gunpowder.

=== Problems of the government ===
Amidst these problems with the insurgency, Sotomayor also had to confront the attacks of English pirates, most notably Thomas Cavendish, who anchored in Quintero on April 9, 1587. There he was defeated by the Spanish, losing 10 men. Additionally, he had to deal with revolts by soldiers in the south, motivated by the poverty that they suffered on account of not being paid in either gold or encomienda rights.

Alarmed by the situation and by the lack of reinforcements, Sotomayor went to Peru on July 30, 1592 to petition the viceroy there for more men. He left the old and circumspect lawyer Pedro de Viscarra, who had arrived from Spain two years earlier with the title of lieutenant governor of Chile.

== Governor of Panama ==
In August, Sotomayor disembarked in Callao, where he learned that the king had named a new governor of Chile, Martín García Óñez de Loyola. He returned to Chile to testify about and defend his actions, a tribunal from which he emerged triumphant. He then headed towards Spain, but was detained on the road by the Viceroy of Peru, who asked him to take charge of the province of Panama, then menaced by English invasion.

== Later life ==
Upon his return to Spain he was again named governor of Chile in 1604. However, due to his bitter frustrations there he declined the post. He joined the Council of the Indies and in 1609 and was charged with the expulsion of the Moriscos from Spain.

== Additional information ==
=== Sources ===
- Pedro Mariño de Lobera. Crónica del Reino de Chile, escrita por el capitán Pedro Mariño de Lobera... reducido a nuevo método y estilo por el Padre Bartolomé de Escobar (1593) (Chronicle of the Kingdom of Chile, written by captain Pedro Mariño de Lobera... summarized to a new method and style by Fr. Bartolomé de Escobar). Crónicas del Reino de Chile, Madrid, Atlas, 1960, pp. 227–562; Biblioteca de Autores Españoles; pp. 569–575; online edition (in Spanish)
- Diego de Rosales, Historia general de el Reyno de Chile, el Flandes Indiano (General History of the Kingdom of Chile, the Indian Flanders). Valparaíso, 1877–1878, 3 Vols.
  - Volume II (1554-1625)
- Felipe Gomez De Vidaurre, HISTORIA GEOGRÁFICA, NATURAL Y CIVIL DEL REINO DE CHILE, TOMO II, CON UNA INTRODUCCIÓN BIOGRÁFICA Y NOTAS POR J. T. MEDINA, Coleccíon de historiadores de Chile, Tomo XV, SANTIAGO DE CHILE, IMPRENTA ERCILLA, 1889 Google Books, Digitized August 4, 2005 (History of Chile 1535-1764)
- Vicente Carvallo y Goyeneche. Descripcion Histórica y Geografía del Reino de Chile (1542-1788) (Historical Description and Geography of the Kingdom of Chile). E Libros from Memoria Chilena, Santiago, 1876; online edition (in Spanish)
  - Tomo I History 1542 - 1626, Tomo 8 de Colección de historiadores de Chile y de documentos relativos a la historia nacional. Santiago : Imprenta del Ferrocarril, 1861.

Government offices
Preceded by Martín Ruiz de Gamboa	Royal Governor of Chile; 1583–1592	Succeeded by Pedro de Viscarra
Preceded by Juan del Barrio	Royal Governor of Panama; 1596–1602	Succeeded by Hernando de Añazco
