= Tasa de Laso de la Vega =

1635 tax rate in Chile

Tasa de Laso de la Vega or Rate of Laso de la Vega, a new tax rate dictated in 1635 by the Royal Governor of Chile Francisco Laso de la Vega. It said that the natives of the encomiendas were free to pay their tribute in money, labor or in gold species at an annual amount of 10 pesos, that was equivalent to 40 days of forced labor. Nevertheless, this rule was rarely actually applied and the native laborers did not see improvement in their conditions.

== See also ==
- Tasa de Santillán
- Tasa de Gamboa
- Tasa de Esquilache
