= Ramiriáñez Bravo de Saravia =

Ramiriáñez Bravo de Saravia y Sotomayor

Alcalde of Santiago
- In office 1586–1587
- Monarch: Philip II of Spain

Personal details
- Born: 12 April 1550 Lima, Peru
- Died: 1594 (aged 43–44) Santiago, Chile
- Occupation: Politician
- Profession: Military man

Military service
- Allegiance: Spanish Empire
- Branch/service: Spanish Army
- Rank: Captain
- Battles/wars: Arauco War; Anglo-Spanish War

Ramiriáñez Bravo de Saravia (1550–1594) was a Spanish nobleman, who served during the Viceroyalty of Peru as alguacil of the Inquisition, alcalde and regidor of Santiago, Chile.

== Biography ==
Born in Lima, he was the son of the Conquistador and Governor of Chile Melchor Bravo de Saravia and Jerónima Sotomayor. His wife was Isabel García, the daughter of Captain Diego García de Cáceres, born in Plasencia.

Ramiriáñez Bravo de Saravia was a descendant of Hernán Bravo de Laguna, lord of Almenar and Pica.

In his military career Ramiriáñez Bravo de Saravia, participated in organized expeditions against the Mapuche Indians. He fought valiantly in the Arauco War. Bravo de Saravia was the commander of Spanish Armada, who led the battle against English pirates led by Thomas Cavendish and Francis Drake the event occurred on 6 June 1572 in the southern Pacific, with the victory of the Spanish army.
