= Royal Audiencia of Chile =

The Royal Audiencia of Chile were two Spanish, colonial courts of appeals with administrative and political authority under the oversight of the viceroy of Peru.

- Royal Audiencia of Concepción, installed in 1565 and abolished in 1575
- Royal Audiencia of Santiago, installed in 1609
