= Crown of Castile =

Former country in the Iberian Peninsula from 1230 to 1715

Coordinates: 40°25′03″N 03°42′54″W

Crown of Castile Corona Castellae (Latin) Corona de Castilla (Spanish)
- 1230–1716
- Royal Standard Coat of arms (Trastámara)

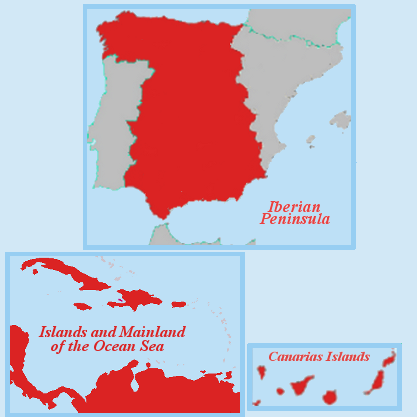
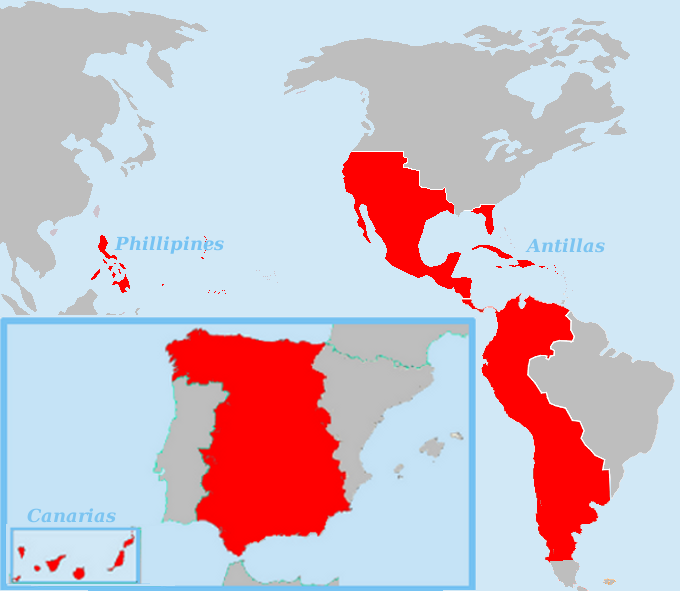
- Evolution of the Crown of Castile
- Capital: Madrid (1561–1601; 1606–1716); Valladolid (1601–1606)^{[a]}
- Official languages: Spanish
- Minority languages: Basque; Galician; Astur-Leonese; Mozarabic; Andalusian Arabic; Judaeo-Spanish; Guanche
- Religion: Official religion: Roman Catholicism; Minority religions: Islam; Sephardic Judaism
- Demonym: Castilian
- Government: Feudal monarchy subject to fueros
- Monarch
  - 1230–1252: Ferdinand III (first)
  - 1474–1504: Isabella I and Ferdinand V
- Legislature: Cortes of Castile
- Historical era: Middle Ages and early modern period
  - Permanent union of Castile & León: 23 September 1230
  - Union of Ferdinand II and Isabella I: 19 October 1469
  - Conquest of Granada: 2 January 1492
  - Occupation of Navarre: 1512 (annexed 7 July 1515)
  - Ascension of Charles I: 23 January 1516
  - Nueva Planta decrees: 1716

Area
- 1300: 335,000 km^{2} (129,000 sq mi)

Population
  - 1300: 3,000,000
- Currency: Spanish real; Spanish maravedí
Preceded by
| Kingdom of Castile |
| Kingdom of León |
| Emirate of Granada |
| Aztec Empire |
| Inca Empire |
Succeeded by
| Habsburg Spain |
| Bourbon Spain |
| British Gibraltar |
- Today part of: Spain
- a. Itinerant court until Philip II fixed it to Madrid.

The Crown of Castile, also known as the Crown of Castile and León, (Note: Spanish: Corona de Castilla, Galician: Coroa de Castela, Leonese: Corona de Castiella, Basque: Gaztelako Koroa, Latin: Corona Castellae.) was a medieval polity in the Iberian Peninsula that formed in 1230 as a result of the third and definitive union of the crowns and, some decades later, the parliaments of the kingdoms of Castile and León upon the accession of the then Castilian king, Ferdinand III, to the vacant Leonese throne. It continued to exist as a separate entity after the personal union in 1479 of the crowns of Castile and Aragon with the marriage of the Catholic Monarchs up to the promulgation of the Nueva Planta decrees by Philip V in 1716.

In 1492, the voyage of Christopher Columbus and the discovery of the Americas were major events in the history of Castile. The West Indies, Islands and Mainland of the Ocean Sea were also a part of the Crown of Castile when transformed from lordships to kingdoms of the heirs of Castile in 1506, with the Treaty of Villafáfila, and upon the death of Ferdinand the Catholic. The discovery of the Pacific Ocean, the conquest of the Aztec Empire, the conquest of the Inca Empire, the Spanish conquest of New Granada as well as the conquest of the Philippines all helped shape the Crown of Castile into a global empire in the 16th Century.

The title of "King of Castile" remained in use by the Habsburg rulers during the 16th and 17th centuries. Charles I was King of Aragon, Majorca, Valencia, and Sicily, and Count of Barcelona, Roussillon and Cerdagne, as well as King of Castile and León, 1516–1556.

In the early 18th century, Philip of Bourbon won the War of the Spanish Succession and imposed unification policies over the Crown of Aragon, supporters of their enemies. This unified the Crown of Aragon and the Crown of Castile into the kingdom of Spain. Even though the Nueva Planta decrees did not formally abolish the Crown of Castile, the country (of Castile and Aragon) was called "Spain" by both contemporaries and historians.

== History ==
=== Preceding events ===
==== Two kingdoms: León and Castile ====
===== Towards unification =====
The Kingdom of León arose out of the Kingdom of Asturias. The Kingdom of Castile appeared initially as a county of the Kingdom of León. From the second half of the 10th century to the first half of the 11th century it changed hands between León and the Kingdom of Navarre. In the 11th century, it became a kingdom in its own right.

The two kingdoms had been united twice previously:

- From 1037 until 1065 under Ferdinand I of León. Upon his death his kingdoms passed to his sons, León to Alfonso VI, Castile to Sancho II, and Galicia to García.
- From 1072 until 1157 under Alfonso VI (died 1109), Urraca (died 1126), and Alfonso VII. From 1111 until 1126 Galicia was separate from the union under Alfonso VII. In 1157 the kingdoms were divided between Alfonso's sons, with Ferdinand II receiving León and Sancho III Castile.

===== Occupation of western Navarre =====
From 1199 to 1201 under Alfonso VIII the Castilian king's armies invaded the Kingdom of Navarre, annexing thereafter Álava, Durangaldea, and Gipuzkoa, including San Sebastián and Vitoria (Gasteiz). However, these western Basque territories saw their Navarrese charters confirmed under Castilian rule.

=== Crown of Castile from the rule of Ferdinand III until the ascension of Charles I ===
==== Union of the two kingdoms under Ferdinand III ====
Ferdinand III received the Kingdom of Castile from his mother, Queen Berengaria of Castile granddaughter of Sancho III in 1217, and the Kingdom of León from his father Alfonso IX of León son of Ferdinand II in 1230. From then on the two kingdoms were united under the name of the Kingdom of León and Castile, or simply as the Crown of Castile. Ferdinand III later conquered the Guadalquivir Valley, while his son Alfonso X conquered the Kingdom of Murcia from Al-Andalus, further extending the area of the Crown of Castile. Given this, the kings of the Crown of Castile traditionally styled themselves "King of Castile, León, Toledo, Galicia, Murcia, Jaén, Córdoba, Seville, and Lord of Biscay and Molina", among other possessions they later gained. The heir to the throne has been titled Prince of Asturias since the 14th century.

==== Union of the Cortes and the legal code ====
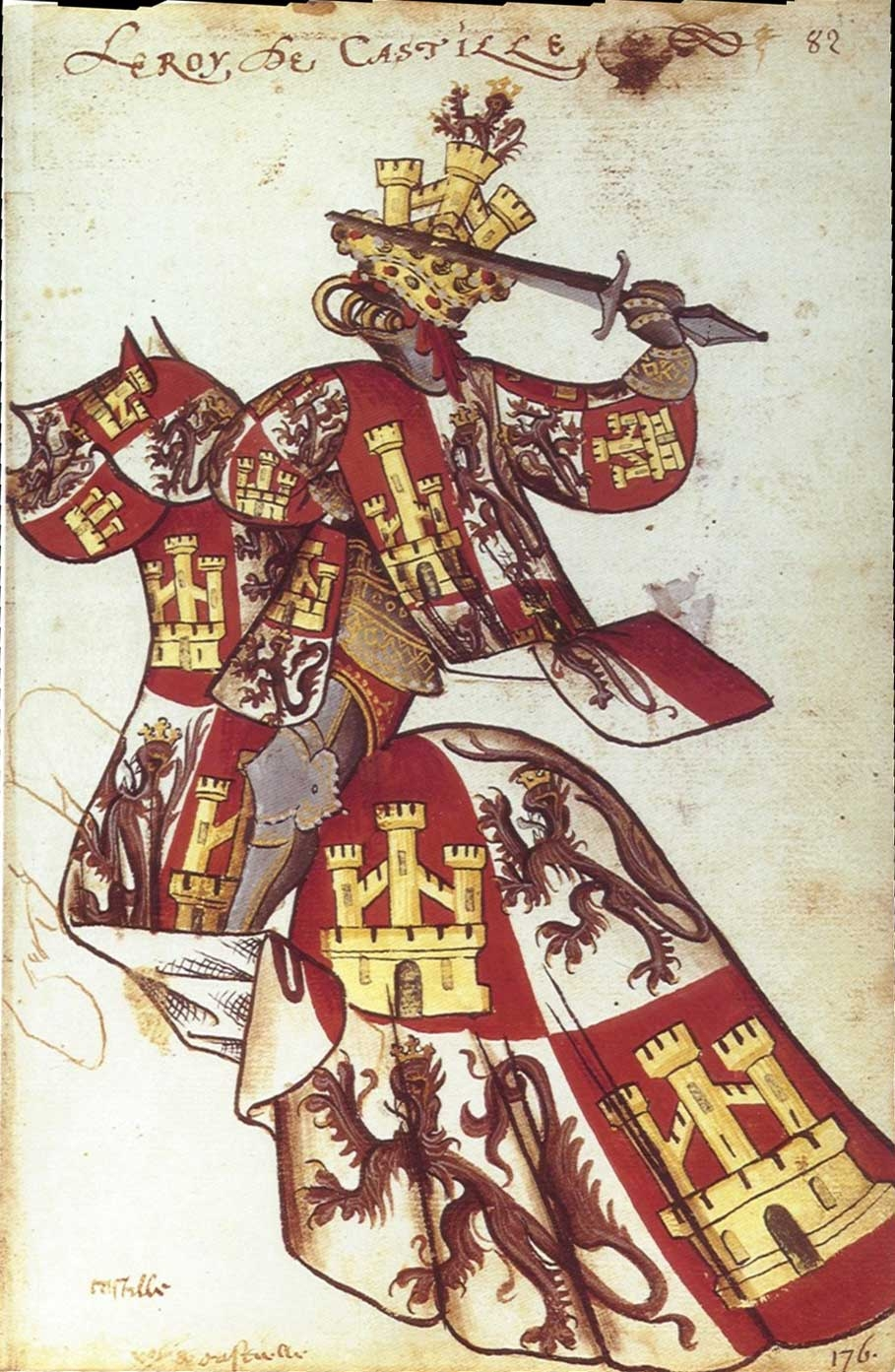
Equestrian heraldic of King John II of Castile in the Equestrian armorial of the Golden Fleece 1433–1435. Collection Bibliothèque de l'Arsenal.

Almost immediately after the union of the two kingdoms under Ferdinand III, the parliaments of Castile and León were united. It was divided into three estates, which corresponded with the nobility, the church and the cities, and included representation from Castile, León, Galicia, Toledo, and the Basque Provinces. Initially the number of cities represented in the Cortes varied over the next century, until John I permanently set those that would be allowed to send representatives (procuradores): Burgos, Toledo, León, Sevilla, Córdoba, Murcia, Jaén, Zamora, Segovia, Ávila, Salamanca, Cuenca, Toro, Valladolid, Soria, Madrid, and Guadalajara (with Granada added after its conquest in 1492).

Under Alfonso X, most sessions of the Cortes of both kingdoms were held jointly. The Cortes of 1258 in Valladolid comprised representatives of Castile, Extremadura and León ("de Castiella e de Estremadura e de tierra de León") and those of Seville in 1261 of Castile, León and all other kingdoms ("de Castiella e de León e de todos los otros nuestros Regnos"). Subsequent Cortes were celebrated separately, for example in 1301 that of Castile in Burgos and that of León in Zamora, but the representatives demanded that the parliaments be reunited from then on.

Although the individual kingdoms and cities initially retained their individual historical rights-including the Old Fuero of Castile (Viejo Fuero de Castilla) and the different fueros of the municipal councils of Castile, León, Extremadura and Andalucía-a unified legal code for the entire new kingdom was created in the Siete Partidas (c. 1265), the Ordenamiento de Alcalá (1348) and the Leyes de Toro (1505). These laws continued to be in force until 1889, when a new Spanish civil code, the Código Civil Español, was enacted.

==== Spanish languages and universities ====
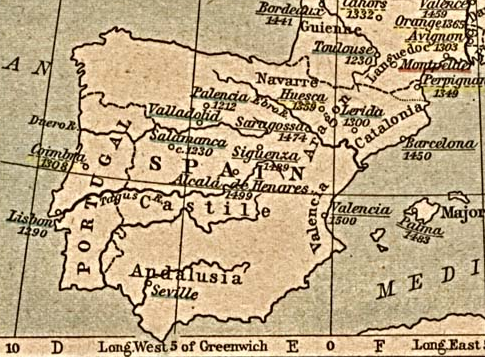
Map of Castilian and Aragonese Universities

In the 13th century there were many languages spoken in the Kingdoms of León and Castile among them Castilian, Leonese, Basque and Galician-Portuguese. But, as the century progressed, Castilian gained increasing prominence as the language of culture and communication – one example of this is the Cantar de Mio Cid.

In the last years of the reign of Ferdinand III, Castilian began to be used for some important documents, such as the Visigothic Code, the basis of the legal code for Christians living in Muslim Cordova, but it was during the reign of Alfonso X that it became the official language. Henceforth all public documents were written in Castilian, likewise all translations of Arabic legal and government documents were made into Castilian instead of Latin.

Some scholars think that the substitution of Castilian for Latin was due to the strength of the new language, whereas others consider that it was due to the influence of Hebrew-speaking intellectuals who were hostile towards Latin, the language of the Christian Church.

In 1492, under the Catholic Monarchs, the first edition of the Grammar of the Castilian Language by Antonio de Nebrija was published. Castilian was eventually carried to the Americas in the 16th century by the conquistadors. Because of Castilian's importance in the land ruled by the Spanish Crown, the language is also known as Spanish.

Furthermore, in the 13th century, many universities were founded where instruction was in Castilian, such as the Leonese University of Salamanca, the Castilian Estudio General of Palencia and the University of Valladolid, which were among the first universities in Europe.

In the 13th century, emerging groups of local grazers coalesced into the powerful Mesta, the headpin for wool trade over the following three centuries. In time, Castile would become a leading export market for wool in the late middle ages.

==== Ascension of the Trastámara dynasty ====
Expansion of Castilian territory.

The Castilian Civil War pitting supporters of Henry of Trastámara against Peter I entailed a struggle of competing factions, with the former party being favoured by the Castilian nobility (and, to a lesser extent, the Clergy), whereas the latter party lied on the side of Jews', conversos' and town councils' interests. A substantial transfer from the royal patrimony to the nobles ensued upon the prevail of the Trastámaras in the conflict. Likewise, the resulting dynastic change ran parallel to a radicalization of the antisemitic sentiment in Castile.

On the death of Alfonso XI a dynastic conflict started between his sons, the Infantes Peter (Pedro) and Henry, Count of Trastámara, which became entangled in the Hundred Years' War between England and France. Alfonso XI had married Maria of Portugal with whom he had his heir, the Infante Peter. However, the King also had many illegitimate children with Eleanor of Guzman, among them the above-mentioned Henry, who disputed Peter's right to the throne once the latter became king.

In the resulting struggle, in which both brothers claimed to be king, Pedro allied himself with Edward, Prince of Wales, "the Black Prince". In 1367, the Black Prince defeated Henry II's allies at the Battle of Nájera, restoring Pedro's reign of the kingdom. The Black Prince, seeing that the king would not reimburse his expenses, left Castile. Henry, who had fled to France, took advantage of the opportunity and recommenced the fight. Henry finally was victorious in 1369 in the Battle of Montiel, in which he had Peter killed.

In 1371, the brother of the Black Prince, John of Gaunt, 1st Duke of Lancaster, married Constance, Peter's daughter. In 1386, John of Gaunt claimed the Crown of Castile in the name of his wife, the legitimate heir according to the Cortes de Seville of 1361. He arrived in A Coruña with an army and took the city. He then moved on to occupy Santiago de Compostela, Pontevedra and Vigo. He asked John I, Henry II's son, to give up the throne in favor of Constance.

John declined but proposed that his son, the Infante Henry, marry John of Gaunt's daughter Catherine. The proposal was accepted, and the title Prince of Asturias was created for Henry and Catherine. This ended the dynastic conflict, strengthened the House of Trastámara's position and created peace between England and Castile.

In the midst of these dynastic negotiations, John I also sought to claim the Portuguese crown through his marriage to Beatrice of Portugal, daughter of King Ferdinand I. This led to a Castilian invasion of Portugal in 1385, culminating in the Battle of Aljubarrota, where Castilian forces suffered a crushing defeat at the hands of the Portuguese under John of Avis. The battle decisively ended Castile's hopes of annexing Portugal and ensured Portuguese independence under the newly established House of Avis.

==== Relations with the Crown of Aragon during the 14th century ====
Castilian territory at the end of the 14th century.

During the reign of Henry III royal power was restored, overshadowing the much powerful Castilian nobility. In his later years Henry delegated some of his power to his brother Ferdinand I of Antequera, who would be regent, along with his wife Catherine of Lancaster, during the childhood of his son John II. After the Compromise of Caspe in 1412, Ferdinand left Castile to become King of Aragon.

Upon the death of his mother, John II at the age of 14, took to the throne and married his cousin Maria of Aragon. The young king entrusted his government to regent Álvaro de Luna, the most influential person in court and allied with the lesser nobility, the cities, the clergy, and the Jews. This brought together the mutual dislikes of the king shared by the greater Castilian nobility and the Aragonese Infantes, sons of Ferdinand I of Antequera, who sought to reign the Castilian crown. This eventually led to war in 1429 and 1430 between the two kingdoms. Álvaro de Luna won the war and expelled the Aragonese Infantes from Castile.

==== Second Conflict of Succession ====
Henry IV unsuccessfully tried to re-establish the peace with the nobility that his father, John II, had shattered. When his second wife, Joan of Portugal, gave birth to Infanta Joanna, it was claimed that she was the result of an affair of the Queen with Beltrán de la Cueva, one of the King's chief ministers.

The King, besieged by riots and the demands of the nobles, had to sign a treaty in which he named as his successor his half-brother Alfonso, leaving Infanta Joanna out of the line of succession. After the death of Alfonso in an accident, Henry IV signed the Treaty of the Bulls of Guisando with his half-sister Isabella I in which he named her heiress in return for her marrying a prince chosen by him.

==== Catholic Monarchs: Dynastic union with the Crown of Aragon ====
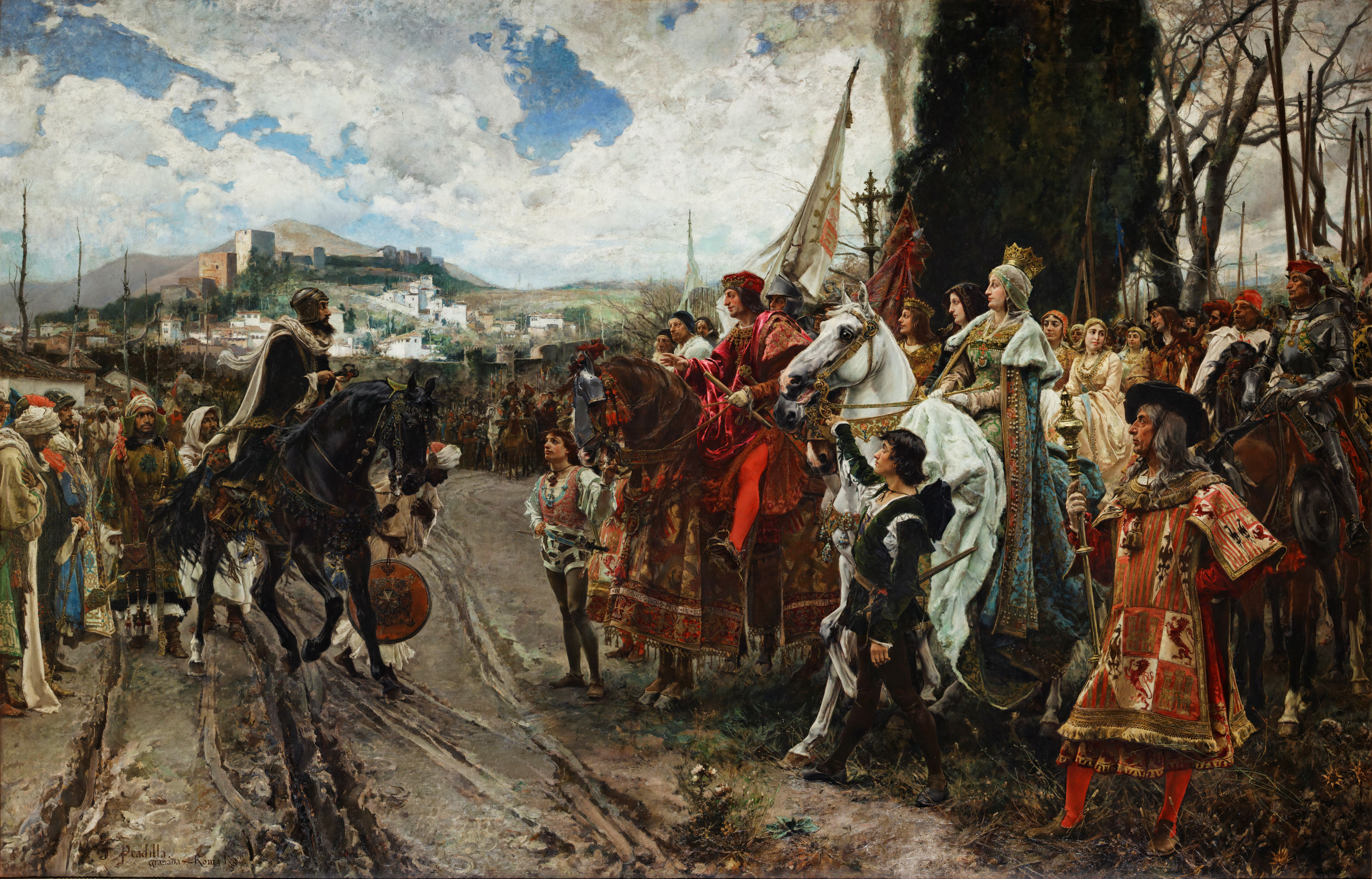
The Surrender of Granada (Francisco Padilla, oil on canvas, 1882)

In October 1469 Isabella I and Ferdinand II, heir to the throne of Aragon, married in secret in the Palacio de los Vivero in Castilian Valladolid. The consequence was a dynastic union of the Crown of Castile and the Crown of Aragon in 1479 when Ferdinand ascended to the Aragonese throne. This union however was not effective until the reign of his grandson Charles I (Holy Roman Emperor Charles V). Ferdinand and Isabella were related and had married without papal approval. Although Isabella wanted to marry Ferdinand, she refused to proceed with the marriage until she received a Papal dispensation. Consequently, Ferdinand's father forged a papal dispensation for the two to marry. Isabella believed that the dispensation was authentic and the marriage went ahead. A genuine papal dispensation arrived afterwards. Later Pope Alexander VI bestowed upon them the title of 'los Reyes Católicos' ('the Catholic Monarchs').

Henry IV, half brother of Isabella, considered the marriage of Ferdinand and Isabella as breaking the Treaty of the Bulls of Guisando, under which Isabella would ascend to the Castilian throne on his death only if her suitor was approved by him. Henry wanted to ally Castile with Portugal or France rather than Aragon. He therefore decided to name his daughter Infanta Joanna as heiress to the throne rather than Isabella I. When he died in 1474, Isabella had herself proclaimed queen and proprietress of the realm, with Ferdinand named her legitimate husband. They then signed the Concord of Segovia (Spanish: Concordia de Segovia), an agreement between two rival political factions drafted to reassure the Castilian nobility that the Aragonese would not interfere in the government of the kingdom, on 15 January 1475 in the Alcázar of Segovia. The pact regulated the joint government of the Crown of Castile following the contested accession of Isabella, and is regarded as a foundational instrument of the dynastic union of the crowns of Castile and Aragon that gave rise to the future Spanish Empire under the Catholic Monarchs.

On 28 April 1475, on the eve of the War of the Castilian Succession against the supporters of Joanna la Beltraneja and her husband Afonso V of Portugal, Isabella issued a document authorising Ferdinand to exercise all the governmental faculties she herself was legally entitled to exercise. This document effectively turned Ferdinand into a king of Castile in the full sense and overrode the separation of competences set out in the Concord, although the latter remained legally valid as the constitutive instrument of their joint rule.

The War of the Castilian Succession broke out over who would ascend to the throne. It lasted until 1479 when Isabella and her supporters came out victorious.

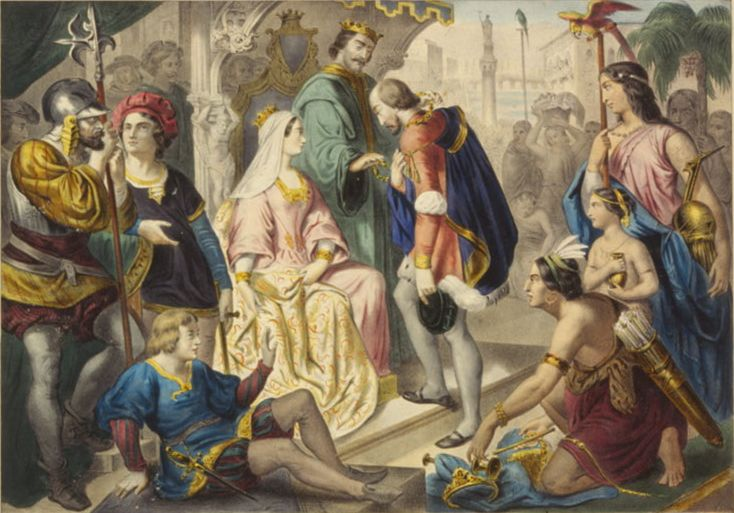
Columbus and the Catholic Monarchs (The return of Columbus)

After Isabella's victory in the civil war and Ferdinand's ascension to the Aragonese throne the two crowns were united under the same monarchs. However, this was a personal union and both kingdoms remained administratively separate to some extent, each maintaining largely its own laws; both parliaments remained separate, the only common institution would be the Inquisition. Despite their titles of "Monarchs of Castile, Leon, Aragon and Sicily" Ferdinand and Isabella reigned over their respective territories, although they also took decisions together. Its central position, larger territorial area (three times greater than that of Aragon) and larger population (4.3 million as opposed to the 1 million in Aragon) led to Castile becoming the dominating partner in the union.

As a result of the Reconquista (Reconquest) the Castilian aristocracy had become very powerful. The monarchs needed to assert their authority over the nobility and the clergy. With this end in mind they founded a law enforcement body, the Consejo de la Hermandad, more commonly known as the Santa Hermandad (the Holy Brotherhood), which was staffed and funded by the municipalities. They also took further measures against the nobility, destroying feudal castles, prohibiting private wars and reducing the power of the Adelantados (a governor-like military office in regions recently conquered). The monarchy incorporated military orders under the Consejo de las Órdenes in 1495, reinforced royal judicial power over the feudal one and transformed the Audiencias into the supreme judicial bodies. The crown also sought to better control the cities, and so in 1480 in the Cortes of Toledo it created the corregidores, representatives of the crown, which supervised the city councils. In religion, they reformed religious orders and sought unity of the various sections of the church. They pressured Jews to convert to Catholicism, in some cases persecuted by the Inquisition. Finally in 1492, the monarchs decided that those who would not convert would be expelled. It is estimated that between 50,000 and 70,000 people were expelled from Castile. From 1502 onwards, they began to convert the Muslim population.

Between 1478 and 1497, the monarchs' forces conquered the three Canary Islands of Gran Canaria, La Palma, and Tenerife. On 2 January 1492 the monarchs entered Granada's Alhambra marking the completion and end of the Reconquista. Also in 1492, the Christopher Columbus maritime expedition claimed the newly found lands in the Americas for the Crown of Castile and began the New World conquests. In 1497 Castile conquered Melilla on the north coast of North Africa. After Castile's conquest of the Kingdom of Granada, its politics turned towards the Mediterranean, and Castile militarily helped Aragon in its problems with France, culminating in the reconquest of Naples for the Crown of Aragon in 1504. Later that same year, Queen Isabella died, on November 26.

==== Period of regency – Joanna I ====
Upon Queen Isabella I's death 1504, the crown passed to her daughter Joanna, who was married to Philip of Austria (nicknamed 'Philip the Handsome'). But Isabella knew of her daughter's possible mental health incapacities (this being the source of her common epithet Juana la Loca, "Joanna the Mad") and named Ferdinand as regent in the case that Joanna "didn't want to or couldn't fulfil her duties". In the 'Salamanca Agreement' of 1505, it was decided that the government would be shared by Philip I, Ferdinand V and Joanna. However, poor relations between Phillip, who was supported by the Castilian nobility, and Ferdinand resulted in Ferdinand renouncing his regent's powers in Castile in order to avoid an armed conflict.

Through the Concordia de Villafáfila of 1506, Ferdinand returned to Aragon and Phillip was recognized as King of Castile, with Joanna a co-monarch. In the Treaty of Villafáfila in 1506 King Ferdinand the Catholic renounced not only the government of Castile in favour of his son-in-law Philip I of Castile but also the lordship of the Indies, withholding a half of the income of the kingdoms of the Indies. Joanna of Castile and Philip immediately added to their titles the kingdoms of Indies, Islands and Mainland of the Ocean Sea. Phillip died and Ferdinand returned in 1507 once again to be regent for Joanna. Her isolated confinement-imprisonment in the Santa Clara Convent at Tordesillas, to last over forty years until death, began with her father's orders in 1510.

In 1512 a joint Castilian-Aragonese force invaded Navarre and most of the Kingdom of Navarre south of the Pyrenees was annexed to Castile.

=== Crown of Castile within Habsburg Spain ===
==== Charles I ====
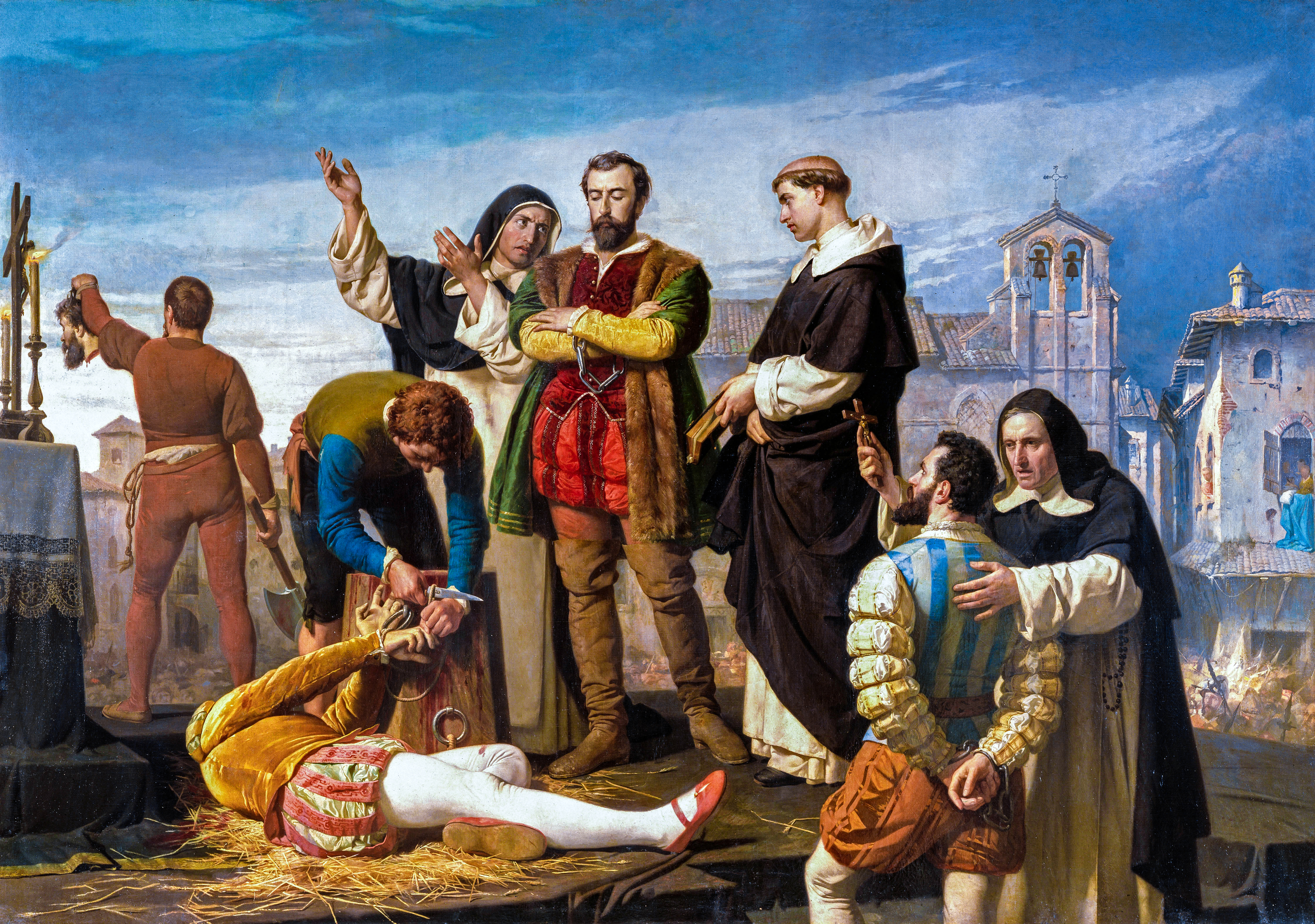
"The Comuneros Padilla, Bravo and Maldonado in the Patíbulo", by Antonio Gisbert, 1860.

Charles I received the Crown of Castile, the Crown of Aragon and the empire through a combination of dynastic marriages and premature deaths:

- when his father Philip I died in 1506, he became sovereign of the Netherlands;
- upon the death of Ferdinand II of Aragon, his grandfather, in 1516 he gained the rule of Aragon and Castile (with the Americas), in co-regency title with his mother Queen Joanna. He maintained her confinement-imprisonment, so she was Queen of Aragon and of Castile in title only.
- upon the death of Maximilian, his paternal grandfather, in 1519, Charles was elected Holy Roman Emperor as a consequence of which he is better-known as Charles V, Holy Roman Emperor.

Charles I was not well received in Castile. This was partly because he was a foreign-born king (born in Ghent), and even before his arrival in Castile he had granted important positions to Flemish citizens and had used Castilian money to fund his court. The Castilian nobility and the cities were on the verge of an uprising to defend their rights. Many Castilians favoured the king's younger brother Ferdinand, who grew up in Castile, and in fact the Council of Castile opposed the idea of Charles as King of Castile.

In 1518, the Castilian parliament in Valladolid named the Wallonian Jean de Sauvage as its president. This caused angry protests in the parliament, which rejected the presence of foreigners in its deliberations. Despite threats, the parliament led by Juan de Zumel representing Burgos, resisted and forced the king to respect the laws of Castile, remove all foreigners from important governmental posts, and learn to speak Castilian. After taking his oath, Charles received a subsidy of 600,000 ducats.

Charles was conscious of the fact that he had options to become emperor and needed to impose his authority over Castile to gain access to its riches for his imperial goals. The riches from the Americas came through Castile which was one of the more dynamic, rich, and advanced territories in Europe in the 16th century. It started to realise that it could become immersed within an empire. This, added to the broken promise of Charles, only increased hostility towards the king. In 1520 in Toledo Parliament rejected a further subsidy for the king. Parliament in Santiago de Compostela reached the same decision. Finally, when Parliament was held in A Coruña, many members were bribed and others denied entry, with the result that the subsidy was approved. Those members who voted in favour were attacked by the Castilian people and their houses were burned. Parliament was not the only opposition which Charles would come up against. When he left Castile in 1520, the Revolt of the Comuneros broke out, and the revolts released Joanna, claiming to support her to be the sole monarch and encouraging her to agree the dethronement of Charles. While sympathetic to revolts, Joanna however refused to sign any documents to support them or depose her son. Los comuneros were defeated one year later (1521). After their defeat, Parliament was reduced to a merely consultative body. To prevent Joanna from being proposed to be an alternative monarch by opponents again, Charles continued her confinement until her death in 1555, after which Charles became the only monarch of Spain.

==== Imperial policies of Philip II ====
Territories represented by the cities with voting rights in Castilian Cortes in the 16th century. The territory of the Basque or exempt provinces is also colored, which had their own foral system (chartered regime) and did not send procurators (representatives) to the Cortes of Castile. Neither did the Kingdom of Navarre, which was already annexed to the Crown but retained its own Cortes

Philip II continued the politics of Charles I, but unlike his father he made Castile the core of the Spanish Empire, centralising all administration in Madrid. The other Spanish regions maintained certain degree of autonomy, being governed by a Viceroy.

In fact, since the reign of Charles I the financial burden of the empire had fallen mainly on Castile, but under Philip II the cost quadrupled. During his reign, as well as increasing existing taxes he created some new ones, among them the excusado in 1567. That same year Philip ordered the proclamation of the La Pragmática; an act whereby all Moriscos had to abandon all Moorish traditions and become true Catholics. This edict limited religious, linguistic and cultural freedom of the Morisco population and provoked the Morisco Revolt (1568–1571), which was put down by John of Austria.

Castile entered a phase of recession in 1575; Spain as a whole followed, which provoked the suspension of wages (the third of his reign). In 1590 the Cortes approved the millones; a new tax on food. This exhausted Castilian cities and hindered the economy. In 1596, pay was once again suspended.

==== Later Habsburgs ====
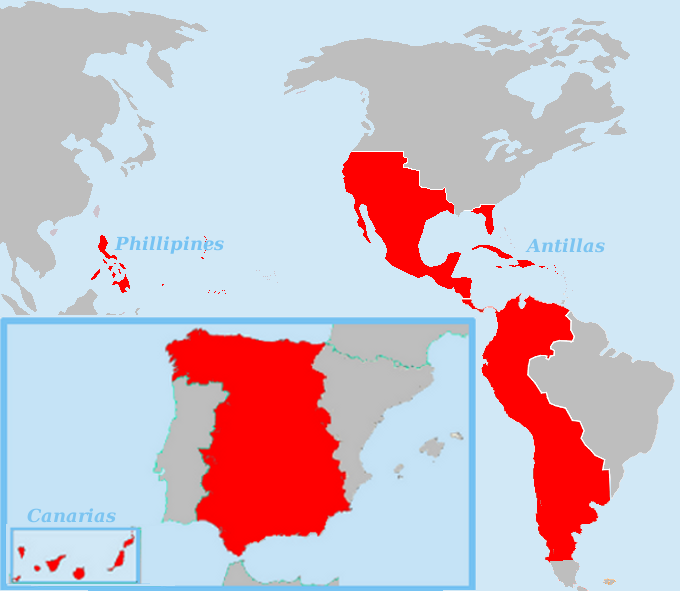
Worldwide Crown of Castile

In the previous kingdoms, positions in national institutions were filled by educated gentlemen. Philip II's administrators would normally come from either the University of Alcalá or the University of Salamanca. After Philip III the nobility once again asserted their right to govern the country. In order to show that there was a new order ruling there was a cleansing of the blood of Spain. Religious persecution led Philip to declare the expulsion of the Moriscos in 1609.

Faced with the collapse of the Exchequer, in order to maintain the hegemony of Philip IV's Spanish Empire, the Count-Duke of Olivares, the king's favourite (valido) from 1621 to 1643, tried to introduce a series of reforms. Among these was the Unión de Armas, the creation of a new army of 140,000 reservists. Every territory within the kingdom contributed citizens proportionally in order to maintain the force. His aims of union did not work and the Spanish Crown continued as a confederation of kingdoms.

Luis Méndez de Haro took over from Olivares as favourite Philip IV between 1659 and 1665. This was in order to alleviate interior conflicts sparked off by his predecessor (revolts in Portugal, Catalonia and Andalusia) and achieve peace in Europe.

Upon the death of Philip IV in 1665, and with the incapacity of Charles II to govern, Spain suffered an economic slowdown and battles for power between the different 'favourites'. The death of Charles II in 1700 without descendants provoked the War of the Spanish Succession.

After the war, all the territories were unified as a single country under the Crown of Spain.

== Territorial divisions within the Crown of Castile ==
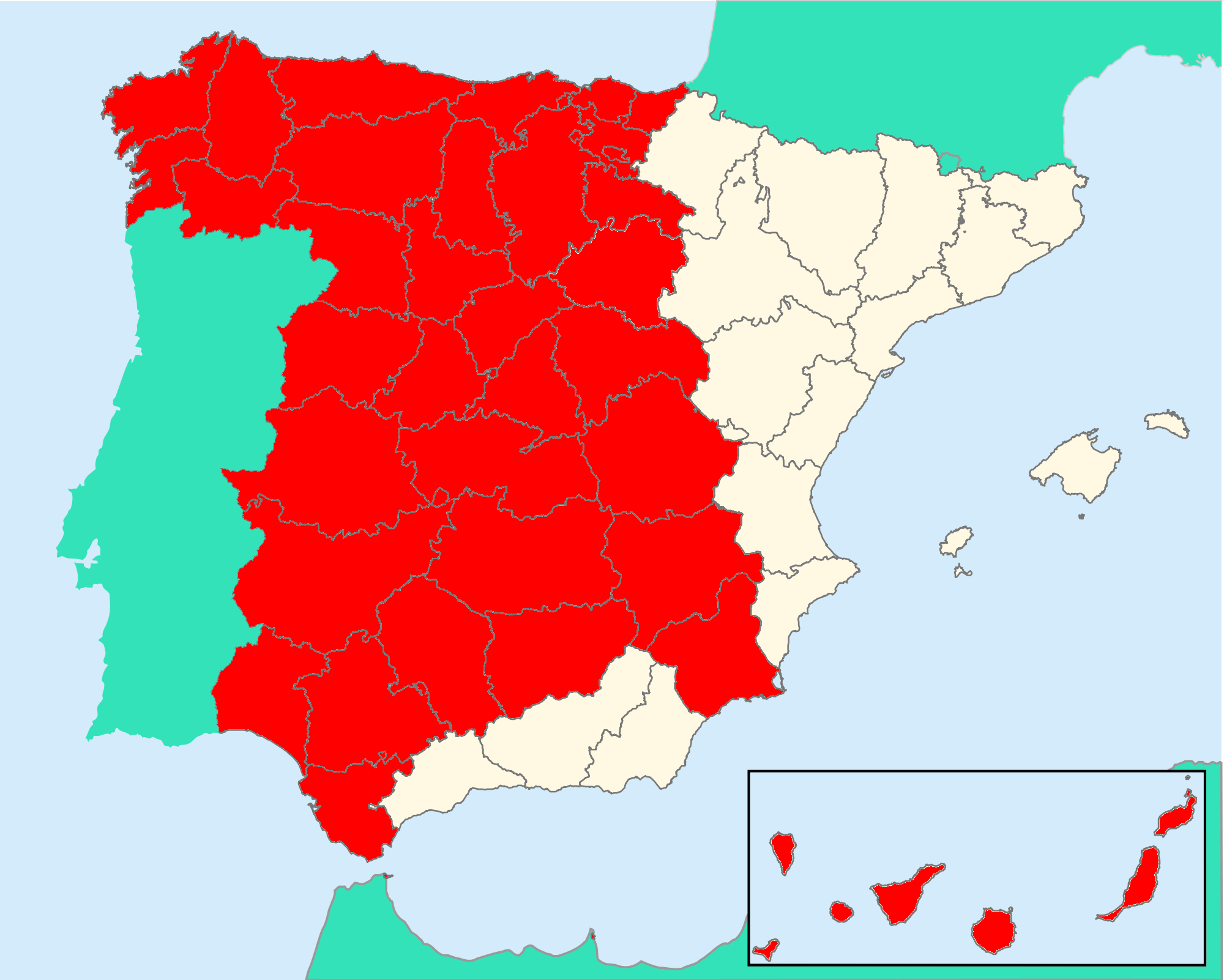
The Crown in late medieval Spain

Spanish North America, 18th century

| Name | Type of entity | Main city | Integration | Notes |
|---|---|---|---|---|
| Castile | Kingdom | Burgos | 1230 | Original territories of the Kingdom of Castile |
| León | Kingdom | León | 1230 | Original territories of the Kingdom of León |
| Galicia | Kingdom | Santiago | 1230 | Original territories of the Kingdom of Galicia |
| Toledo | Kingdom | Toledo | 1230 | Created out of the conquered territories of the Taifa of Toledo |
| Asturias | Principality | Oviedo | 1230 | Place of origin of the earlier Kingdom of Asturias |
| Álava | Lordship | Vitoria | 1230 | Integrated into the Castilian realm around 1200 |
| Guipúzcoa | Lordship | San Sebastián | 1230 | Integrated into the Castilian realm around 1200 |
| Córdoba | Kingdom | Córdoba | 1236 | Created out of the conquered territories of the Taifa of Córdoba |
| Jaén | Kingdom | Jaén | 1246 | Created out of the conquered territories of the Taifa of Jaén |
| Seville | Kingdom | Seville | 1248 | Created out of the conquered territories of the Taifa of Seville |
| Murcia | Kingdom | Murcia | 1258 | Created out of the conquered territories of the Taifa of Murcia |
| Biscay | Lordship | Bermeo | 1370 | Inherited by the Castilian monarchs in 1370 |
| Canaries | Kingdom | Teguise | 1479 | Conquered by the Castilians between 1409 and 1496 |
| Granada | Kingdom | Granada | 1492 | Created out of the conquered territories of the Emirate of Granada |
| Indies | Kingdom | Santo Domingo | 1492 | Abstract grouping of all the Castilian overseas colonial kingdoms |
| Indies | Viceroyalty | Santo Domingo | 1492 | Early Castilian colonial attempts in the Caribbean ruled by a hereditary viceroy from Columbus' family. Abolished in 1526 |
| New Spain | Viceroyalty | México | 1521 | Grouping of the colonial kingdoms of Santo Domingo, México, Guatemala, New Galicia and the Philippines, ruled by a viceroy from Mexico City |
| Perú | Viceroyalty | Lima | 1542 | Grouping of the colonial kingdoms of Tierra Firme, Peru, New Granada, Charcas, Quito, Chile, and Buenos Aires, ruled by a viceroy from Lima |
| Santo Domingo | Kingdom (Overseas) | Santo Domingo | 1526 | Colonial provinces and territories under the Real Audiencia of Santo Domingo |
| México | Kingdom (Overseas) | México | 1527 | Colonial provinces and territories under the Real Audiencia of Mexico |
| Tierra Firme | Kingdom (Overseas) | Panamá | 1538 | Colonial provinces and territories under the Real Audiencia of Panama |
| Perú | Kingdom (Overseas) | Lima | 1542 | Colonial provinces and territories under the Real Audiencia of Lima |
| Guatemala | Kingdom (Overseas) | Guatemala | 1543 | Colonial provinces and territories under the Real Audiencia of Guatemala |
| New Galicia | Kingdom (Overseas) | Guadalajara | 1548 | Colonial provinces and territories under the Real Audiencia of Guadalajara |
| New Granada | Kingdom (Overseas) | Santa Fe | 1549 | Colonial provinces and territories under the Real Audiencia of Santa Fe de Bogotá |
| Charcas | Kingdom (Overseas) | Charcas | 1559 | Colonial provinces and territories under the Real Audiencia of Charcas |
| Quito | Kingdom (Overseas) | Quito | 1563 | Colonial provinces and territories under the Real Audiencia of Quito |
| Chile | Kingdom (Overseas) | Santiago | 1565 | Colonial provinces and territories under the Real Audiencia of Concepción and Santiago |
| Philippines | Kingdom (Overseas) | Manila | 1584 | Colonial provinces and territories under the Real Audiencia of Manila |
| Buenos Aires | Kingdom (Overseas) | Buenos Aires | 1661 | Colonial provinces and territories under the Real Audiencia of Buenos Aires |

== See also ==
- Heraldry of Castile
- Heraldry of León
- Kingdom of Castile
- Kingdom of León
- Kingdom of Galicia
- List of Castilian Monarchs
- Chief of the King's Guard (Portugal and Castile)
- Castile (historical region)
