= Tasa de Gamboa =

Tasa de Gamboa or Rate of Gamboa was a money tax rate applied to the indigenous peoples in the Captaincy General of Chile by the Governor Martin Ruiz de Gamboa, in place of the tribute of personal service in the encomienda system, as desired by the kings of Spain. It replaced the Tasa de Santillán in an effort to end the abuses of the tribute of personal service.

== Description ==
In the 1580 Rate of Gamboa, the tribute of personal service was abolished, however the Indians of the repartimientos were required to pay nine pesos annually in the diocese of Santiago, and seven in the diocese of La Imperial. The post of corregidor was created to oversee the tax system and the protection of the Indians. These functionaries were to be supported by a portion of the tax, but a majority of it went to the encomenderos.

These civil servants called corregidors were to guard the interests of the natives of their respective district and he was called on to regulate the work of the native laborers. The native who sold his labor received a wage, determined by the justicia mayor. The tribute of the rate was deducted from those wages the natives obtained from their work. This was kept in a coffer with three keys, the box of the community, to which the corregidor, the priest and the cacique of the native people had access.

== History ==
From its beginning the bishop of Santiago Diego de Medellín, arranged that no encomendero that used the labor of the natives received the sacraments. However, this new system did not satisfy anybody, the natives suffered more abuses from the corregidors than from the encomenderos, and the encomenderos suffered great losses to their income. Thus within a few years of Gamboa's replacement by governor Alonso de Sotomayor the Rate of Gamboa was abolished in 1587, and Sotomayor returned to a labor service system similar to that of the Tasa de Santillán.

== See also ==
- Tasa de Esquilache
- Tasa de Laso de la Vega
