= Tasa de Santillán =

Tasa de Santillán or Rate of Santillán was a rate of indigenous labor applied in the Captaincy General of Chile by Spanish governor García Hurtado de Mendoza, the first formal regulation of the system of encomiendas in Chile. Promulgated in 1558, it was the first set of laws that regulated labor relations between the Spaniards and Mapuche natives. Its creator was jurist Hernando de Santillán, who came with Garcia Hurtado de Mendoza to Chile.

== Description ==
The Rate was a system for indigenous labor, that instead of making all the natives work in a repartimiento, determined a system whereby they took turns doing the required service. The cacique of each tribe being forced to send a man for each six men in the encomienda for the operation of the mines, and one of each five for agricultural work. This worker, who until then had not been paid a wage, had to be remunerated with the sixth part of the product of his work. The regulation exempted those under 18 and over 50 years old from the work in the encomienda, as well as women.

In 1580, a new decree to regulate indigenous labor was instilled by the governor Martín Ruiz de Gamboa, known as the Tasa de Gamboa.

== See also ==
- Tasa de Esquilache
- Tasa de Laso de la Vega
