= Guaqui River =

River in Chile

Guaqui or Guaque River is a tributary of the Bío Bío River in the Bío Bío Region of Chile. It is a river of great volume with a course of 55 kilometers originating from small streams, that have their source west of the town of Las Canteras; it runs to the west, north of the city of Los Ángeles, and it empties on the right bank of the Bio Bio, immediately south of the small town of Diuquin. Its major tributary is the Rarinco River. Near its mouth was the site of the old fort Santo Arbol de la Cruz. Guaqui, is a derivative of the Mapudungun guaqueñ, "murmur".

== Sources ==
- Francisco Solano Asta Buruaga y Cienfuegos, Diccionario geográfico de la República de Chile, SEGUNDA EDICIÓN CORREGIDA Y AUMENTADA, NUEVA YORK, D. APPLETON Y COMPAÑÍA. 1899. pg.300 Guaque. — Rio
