= Santo Árbol de la Cruz =

Santo Arbol de la Cruz was a fort constructed in 1585 by the Royal Governor of Chile Alonso de Sotomayor. It was located north of the entrance of the Guaqui River into the Bio Bio River near the modern rail station and village of Duiquín.

== History ==
In this site, the Jesuits established a residence, in the settlement of Postahue that was abandoned upon the expulsion of the Jesuits in 1767.

It resisted the attacks that destroyed most of the forts during the Mapuche general rebellion of 1599 and served as part of the device later created by Governor Alonso de Ribera to set the border on the Biobío River.

== Sources ==
- Francisco Solano Asta Buruaga y Cienfuegos, Diccionario geográfico de la República de Chile, SEGUNDA EDICIÓN CORREGIDA Y AUMENTADA, NUEVA YORK, D. APPLETON Y COMPAÑÍA. 1899. pg. 193 Cruz (Fuerte de la)
  - pg. 571 Postahue. — Fundo
