= Drake's Assault on Panama =

Military event that took place in January 1596 during the Anglo–Spanish War

- Part of the Anglo–Spanish War
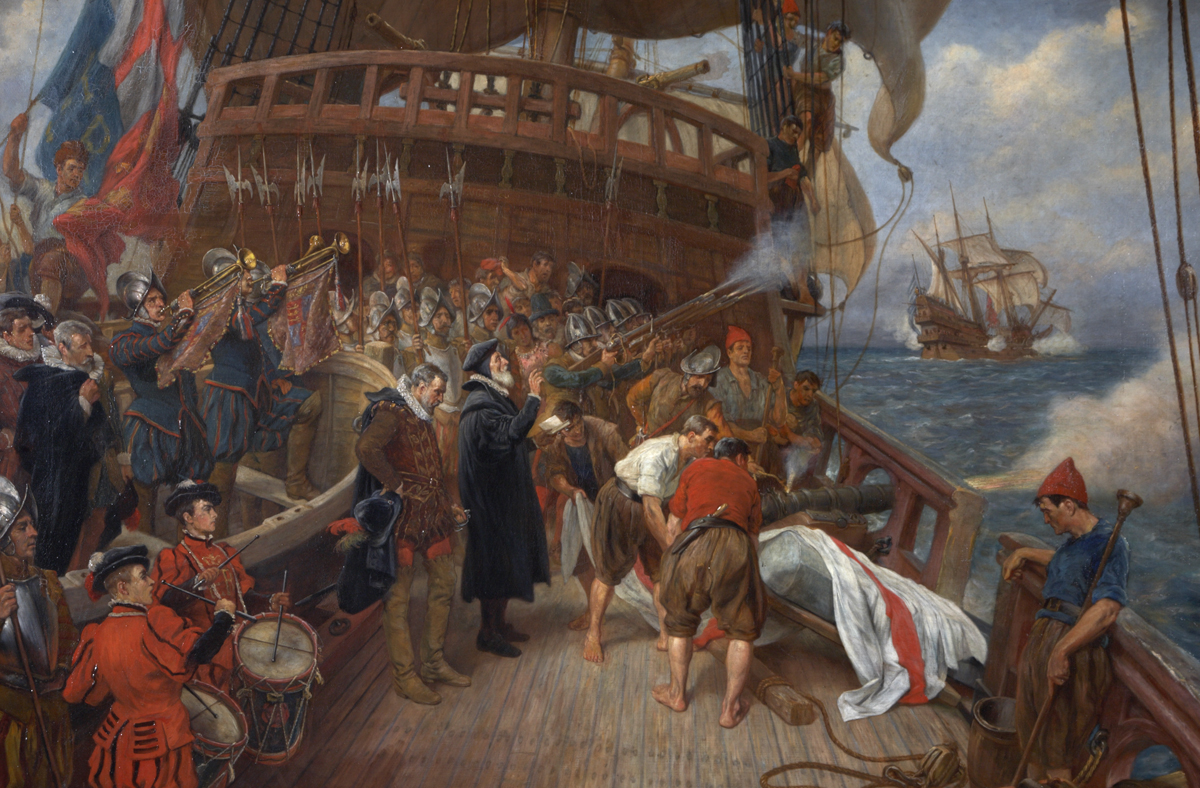
- Burial of Drake off Panama in 1596, painting by Thomas Davidson
Date	6 – 20 January 1596
Location	Isthmus of Panama
Result	Spanish victory

Belligerents
Spain	England

Commanders and leaders
Alonso de Sotomayor; Juan Enríquez Conabut	Francis Drake # Thomas Baskerville

Strength
Various shores defences 200 soldiers & militia	15 ships 600 soldiers & sailors

Casualties and losses
Unknown	Heavy; Many to disease 2 ships scuttled

Drake's Assault on Panama also known as the Defence of Panama was a military event that took place in January 1596 during the Anglo–Spanish War. An English expedition under the command of Francis Drake and Thomas Baskerville attacked the Spanish Main via Nombre de Dios in order to cross the isthmus of Panama. Ravaged with dysentery and other diseases the English were repelled and defeated. Drake would die of the former and the expedition was forced to retreat back to England all the while harassed by the Spanish.

== Background ==
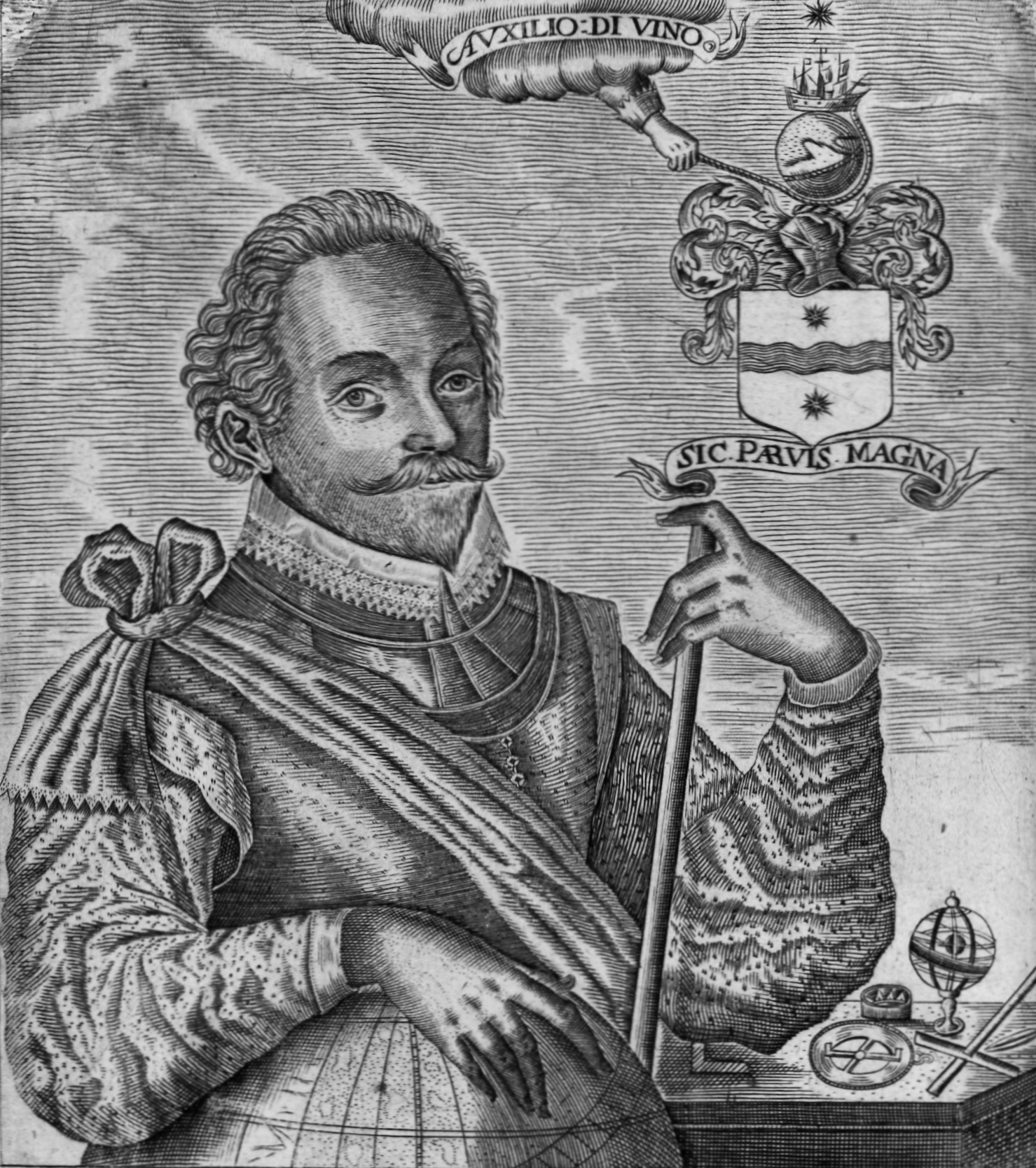
Sir Francis Drake

In 1595 Queen Elizabeth I of England had sent Francis Drake and John Hawkins on an expedition against the Spanish Main in an attempt to strike a blow against the source of Spain's gold and silver from their West Indian Fleet. The English tried to capture San Juan in Puerto Rico with 27 canoes and 2,500 men. The attack was a failure, and the strengthened Spanish defences further discouraged Drake from attacking again. Drake decided to sail away in search of easier prey further South. Disease however by this point had taken its toll on the English force, and John Hawkins died not long after off Puerto Rico. Thomas Baskerville then became second-in-command.

The expedition then headed towards South America and a week later they closed on Rio de la Hacha. On December 18, Drake seized the town following which the fleet then seized the neighbouring settlements of La Ranchería and Tapia, where more booty was acquired. A ransom failed and Drake promptly sacked and burned the area. The English sailed South West and two weeks later launched an attack on Santa Marta; the city was found abandoned as the Spanish had been forewarned of their arrival. Nevertheless, they managed to capture the Spanish Governor, Francisco Ordonez Flores. A ransom of 4,000 ducats was gained and the governor was released, following which the town was burned. By this time the English crews were severely reduced because of disease and therefore an assault on Cartagena de Indias was deemed too risky. Drake instead wanted to march across the isthmus of Panama and attempt to claim it for his own. He headed for Nombre de Dios, where he hoped to send his troops led by Baskerville to the Pacific and capture the port of Panama, an important Spanish base where gold and silver was sent to Spain.

The Spanish in the region of Central America nevertheless were now prepared. Alonso de Sotomayor had been sent by the Viceroy of Peru to prepare defensive measures on the Camino Real and the Chagres River which would bar any assault Westward.

== Assault on the isthmus ==
=== Nombre de Dios ===
On 6 January 1596 Drake and his men dropped anchor off Nombre de Dios without opposition. From the ships' boats they landed near the town but in order to seize it a small fort stood in its way, protected by around hundred militia. Baskerville ordered an assault, following which the fort was overwhelmed and the defenders were put to flight. The town was seized with scant resistance but little plunder was obtained. The place had been warned and the town's few Spanish defenders had retreated and dispersed into the jungle.

Drake stayed for two weeks and ransomed the town but on hearing no answer he ordered the town destroyed and so it was set ablaze. All of the ships in the harbour (consisting of frigates, barks, and galliots) were thoroughly pillaged, after which they were all destroyed or burnt. Although no money was found in the town, a watchtower on the summit of a nearby hill was discovered which contained a chest of silver along with two bars of gold, some pearls, and other valuables.

=== Battle of Capirilla Hill ===
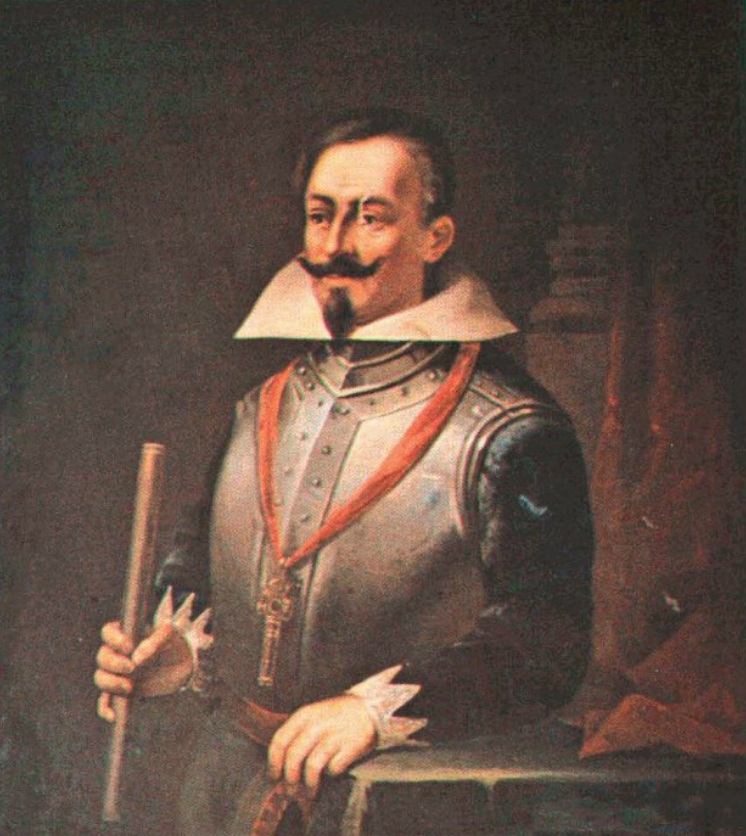
Alonso de Sotomayor the Spanish soldier who organised Panama's defence

In order to clear the environs of lurking parties of the Spanish, Baskerville picked a force of 750 men. On 20 January they started upon the perilous march by the old Panama road. They occupied the small settlement of Venta de la Quebrada two days later but on the third day, after an exhausting march of nearly thirty miles in incessant rain and high humidity, Baskerville had found himself confronted by a gorge near another settlement of Capirilla. Further forward this became more precipitous and the road was dominated from above by a menacing hill. Surrounding the top of the hill was an impressive defensive structure composed of a defile with an impenetrable abatis. Defending this fort were around seventy Spanish troops under Captain Juan Enríquez Conabut dug in to bar the English advance across the isthmus. Baskerville nevertheless ordered an attack to take the hill but this terrain was well chosen by the Spanish; the English attempted for three hours to dislodge the defenders. Each time they assaulted however they were repelled and suffered heavy casualties. The Spaniards were then reinforced by an additional fifty arquebusiers under Captain Hernando de Lierno Agüero, which turned the tide. By this time half of Baskerville's remaining provisions and ammunition were ruined due to the rain and heavy humidity. Even if he did take the hill, he realised that he would have to fight his way through a succession of such obstacles to Panama and would have no troops left to hold it. The English retreated leaving the hill in the hands of the victorious Spaniards. Losses for the English were over sixty men killed or wounded including Baskerville's brother Nicholas. Spanish losses were only seven killed with an unknown number wounded.

Baskerville's contingent, many of them sick and now demoralised, sent a desperate note to Drake to meet him with supplies and 200 men on the way back. Eventually the depleted force rejoined Drake at Nombre de Dios on 22 January. Drake's and the crews' morale plummeted and three days later they departed westward.

=== Death of Drake ===
On January 27 Drake's fleet anchored off Escudo de Veraguas Island, but his force by this time was ravaged by the disease. The fittest men, numbering 37 men, attempted to draw water from the Fator River, and were set upon by angry Spanish residents (many of whom were freed slaves) of Santiago del Príncipe from the mainland opposite. The English party were then massacred with only handful escaping. With this bitter news, Drake ordered the fleet to sail east toward Porto Bello but within a few days he himself was suffering from severe dysentery.

On the night of 28 – 29 January 1596, Drake succumbed aboard his flagship Defiance. The following morning, before dying Drake asked to be dressed in his full armour. He was buried at sea in a lead-lined coffin, off Buenaventura Island near Porto Bello. Baskerville assumed command of the fleet and, after contemplating a repeat attack against Santa Marta, he decided rather to order his disheartened men toward Santiago.

According to the information they had, a fleet of sixty sail had been sent out from Spain against them, and this they believed would be stationed at the Yucatan Channel to intercept their homeward course. It was therefore agreed to hold together and attempt to escape by the outward bound route. To this end the fleet was compressed and reorganised, and as though in honour of the name, Thomas Drake was made vice-admiral. Once there and with the crews further weakened by disease he finally completed a retreat to England. In the process the 195-ton Elizabeth and 50-ton Delight were scuttled due to their poor condition and a lack of crew to sail them.

== Aftermath ==
The Spanish intercepted the retreating English near the Isla de la Juventud; in the ensuing Battle of Pinos, the English managed to drive off the Spanish fleet and escape to England. Despite the expedition's failure, the gold sent to Spain was not enough; in 1597, Philip II of Spain defaulted on his debts and was unable to obtain credit for the last two years of his reign.

News of Drake's death was received with rejoicing along the Spanish Main; in Spain itself, the devout greeted it as a sign the sins for which Heaven had permitted him to torment them had been expiated. The Spanish poet Lope de Vega wrote a triumphant poem to celebrate the removal of the scourge of the Church.

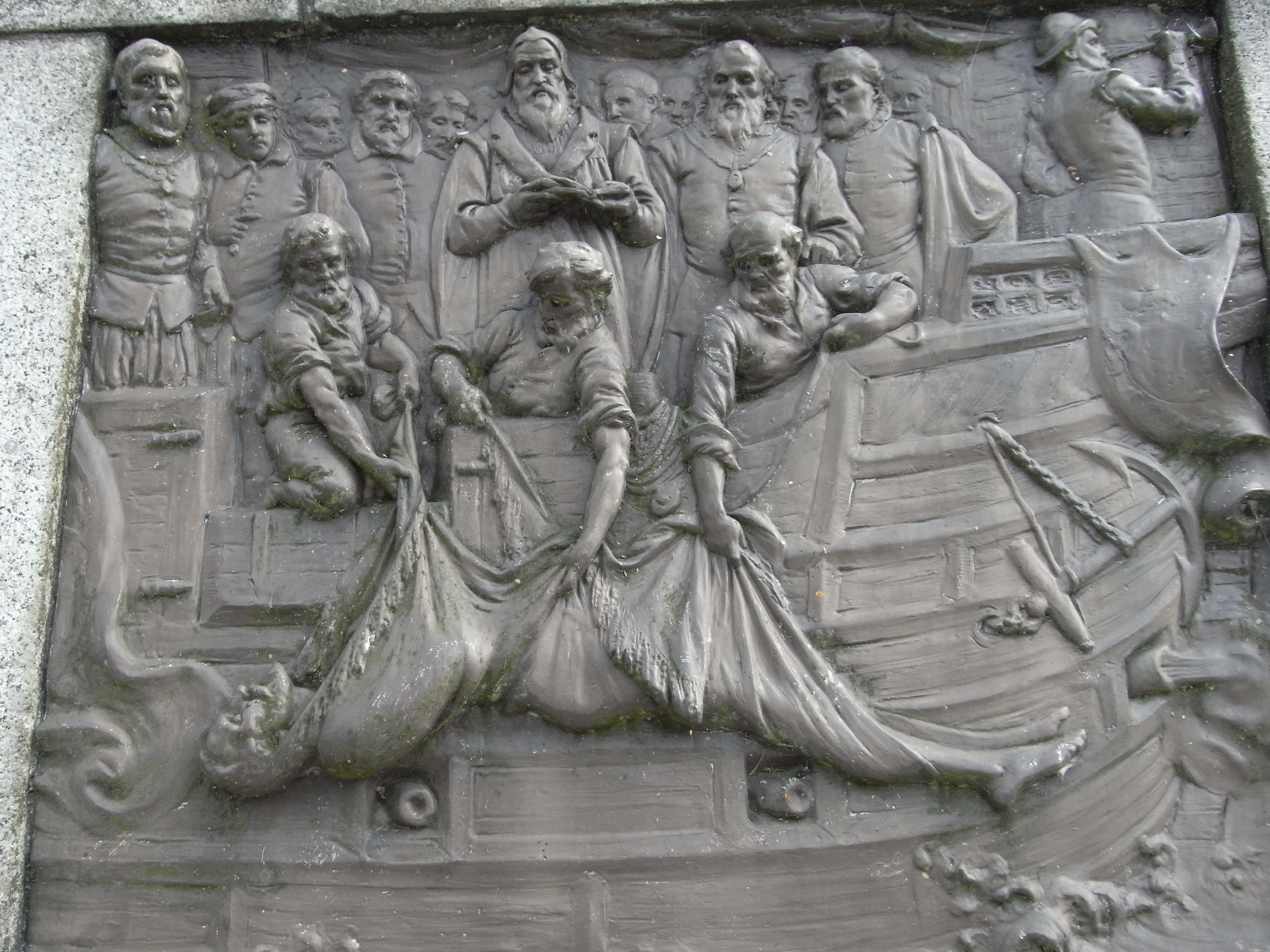
Sir Francis Drake buried at sea. One of 4 bronze relief plaques on the base of the Drake statue in Tavistock in Devon

When news of the defeat arrived in England, Elizabeth demanded this 'humiliation' be avenged. To demonstrate continuing English naval strength, she ordered George Clifford, 3rd Earl of Cumberland to seize San Juan and hold it for as long as possible. In June, Cumberland succeeded where Drake had failed and captured San Juan, which he held for nearly two months before disease forced his withdrawal.

=== Drake's coffin ===
Drake's coffin is assumed to have been deposited off Buenaventura Island, near the Elizabeth and the Delight, which were scuttled in Portobelo Bay. Wreckage thought to be that of the two ships was found by divers in 2011 but attempts to locate the coffin have been unsuccessful.

== See also ==
- Henry Morgan's Panama expedition

== Sources ==
- Andrews, Kenneth R, ed. (2017). The Last Voyage of Drake and Hawkins Hakluyt Society, Second Series. Routledge. ISBN 9781317026280.
- Benson, E.F (2012). Sir Francis Drake. BoD – Books on Demand. ISBN 9783863825294.
- Bicheno, Hugh (2012). Elizabeth's Sea Dogs: How England's Mariners Became the Scourge of the Seas. Conway. ISBN 978-1844861743.
- Bradley, Peter T (2000). British Maritime Enterprise in the New World: From the Late 15th to the Mid-18th Century. Edwin Mellen Press Ltd. ISBN 978-0773478664.
- Keeler, Mary Frear (1999). Sir Francis Drake's West Indian Voyage, 1585-86 (Second Series). Hakluyt Society. ISBN 978-0904180015.
- Kelsey, Harry (2012). Sir Francis Drake: The Queen's Pirate. Yale University Press; 1st Ed. ISBN 978-0300071825.
- Jowitt, Claire (2007). Pirates? the Politics of Plunder, 1550-1650. Reston, Virginia: American Institute of Aeronautics and Astronautics. p. 138. ISBN 978-0230003279.
- Marley, David (2008). Wars of the Americas: A Chronology of Armed Conflict in the Western Hemisphere. ABC-CLIO. ISBN 978-1598841008.
- Van Middeldyk, R. A (2008). The History of Puerto Rico. Echo Library. ISBN 978-1-4068-7497-6.
- Sugden, John (2004). Sir Francis Drake. Penguin Books. ISBN 978-1844137626.
- Wheat, David (2016). Atlantic Africa and the Spanish Caribbean, 1570-1640. UNC Press Books. ISBN 9781469623801.
