= Martín Ruiz de Gamboa =

Spanish conquistador

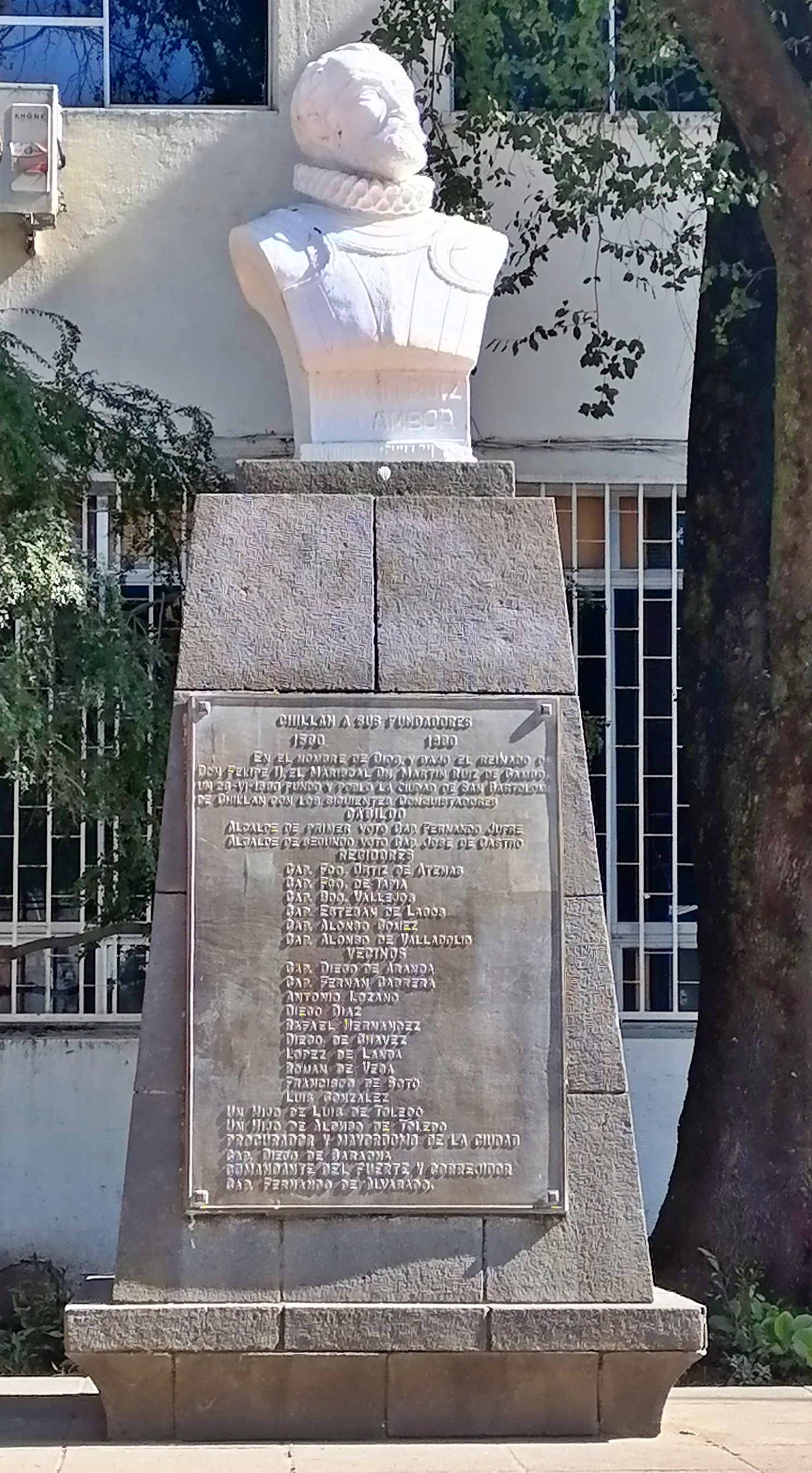
- Bust of Martín Ruiz de Gamboa

Royal Governor of Chile
- In office 1580–1583
- Monarch: King Philip II
- Preceded by: Rodrigo de Quiroga
- Succeeded by: Alonso de Sotomayor

Personal details
- Born: 1531 Durango, Biscay, Spain
- Died: 1590 (aged 56–57) Santiago, Chile
- Spouse: Isabel de Quiroga

Martín Ruiz de Gamboa de Berriz (Spanish pronunciation: [maɾˈtin rwiθ ðe ɣamˈβo.a]; 1533 – 1590) was a Spanish conquistador who served as a Royal Governor of Chile.

== Biography ==
=== Early years ===
He was born in Durango, Biscay, the son of Andrés Ruiz de Gamboa and Nafarra de Berriz, and served as a youth in the royal navy in the Levant. Before the age of 18, he traveled to Peru, eventually arriving in Chile in 1552.

Remaining in the area, he would participate in the Arauco War, being named in 1565 the lieutenant general for the governor at the time Rodrigo de Quiroga, with whom he had familial ties after marrying his daughter Isabel de Quiroga.

=== Governor of Chiloé ===
He achieved the conquest of the island of Chiloé by subduing the docile Cuncos Indians. He named the island New Galicia, and on November 12, 1567, founded the city of Santiago de Castro there. He was governor of Chiloé, and in 1568 Melchor Bravo de Saravia named him general and chief justice of Arauco and Tucapel.

Given his experience in the Arauco War, the Real Audiencia entrusted him with the direction of the war. However, in 1569 he suffered a complete defeat in the Battle of Catirai, losing his encomienda and suffering a marginalization from public life.

=== Governor of Chile ===
He returned to prominence when Rodrigo de Quiroga received his second mandate. Because of the sickness of the governor, Gamboa was again entrusted with the leadership of the war effort. In 1577, Quiroga named Gamboa his successor in his will, and just before his death, made him interim governor. All this was allowed because of privileges granted by the king at the time, Philip II of Spain.

As soon as Quiroga died, on February 25, 1580, the cabildo of Santiago sent messengers to Gamboa to ask him to return to the capital to receive the mandate. He was sworn in on March 8, 1580. He then pursued the ratification of his mandate by the Viceroy of Peru and the king.

=== Tasa de Gamboa ===
The Viceroy delayed nearly a year in his confirmation, and the king took an even more ambivalent view towards him. In order to fully secure the trust of the king, Gamboa thought that the achievement of the king's wishes that the Indians be protected would increase his standing. For this he replaced the Tasa de Santillán, which itself had never really been enforced, with another which is known today as the Tasa de Gamboa. This replaced the tribute of labor required of the Indians with a simple monetary tax. The Indians of the repartamientos were required to pay nine pesos annually in the diocese of Santiago, and seven in La Imperial. The post of corregidor was created to oversee the tax system and the protection of the Indians. These functionaries were to be supported by a portion of the tax, but a majority of it went to the encomenderos.

This new system provoked increasing confrontations with the encomenderos, as they were sure (and later proved correct) that the Indians wouldn't pay the new tribute and would instead dedicate themselves to leisure. The new enemies that Gamboa thus created for himself began to pass rumors to the Viceroy, who each day had a more negative image of Gamboa.

Amidst all this, Gamboa had to respond to a rebellion by his lieutenant governor Lope de Azócar, who opposed his administration. However, the governor was able to gain control of the situation, pressuring Azocar, and finally chasing him from Chile.

Gamboa spent the final years of his mandate (1581-1583) in the south of the country, engaged in permanent conflict with the natives. On June 25, 1580 he had founded a city named San Bartolomé Chillán y Gamboa, which became known as Chillán. The situation of the war during his tenure only worsened, since the rebellion of the Mapuches was joined by the Huilliches, who previously had not been aggressive, and by the Pehuenche nearby Chillán.

=== Final years ===
As a result of the setbacks, Gamboa had to send for reinforcements from Spain and Peru. These arrived well enough (although there were many desertions during the journey), but under the command of Alonso de Sotomayor, Gamboa's successor designated by the king. Gamboa was in Chillán when he heard the news, and handed over his command and treated his successor with courtesy. However, Sotomayor had also come to hear the innumerable complaints against Gamboa and judge his guilt. As a result, he had to detain Gamboa in the government house in Santiago, letting him out only on bail. Eventually, he was absolved and given his freedom.

Gamboa had long waited for the permission of the Audiencia of Lima to travel to Spain to justify his conduct to the king. However, he never realized this trip, living his last days in Santiago away from the interference of the government. He died at Santiago in 1590.

Government offices
| Preceded by Rodrigo de Quiroga | Royal Governor of Chile; 1580–1583 | Succeeded by Alonso de Sotomayor |
