= Melchor Bravo de Saravia =

Spanish conquistador

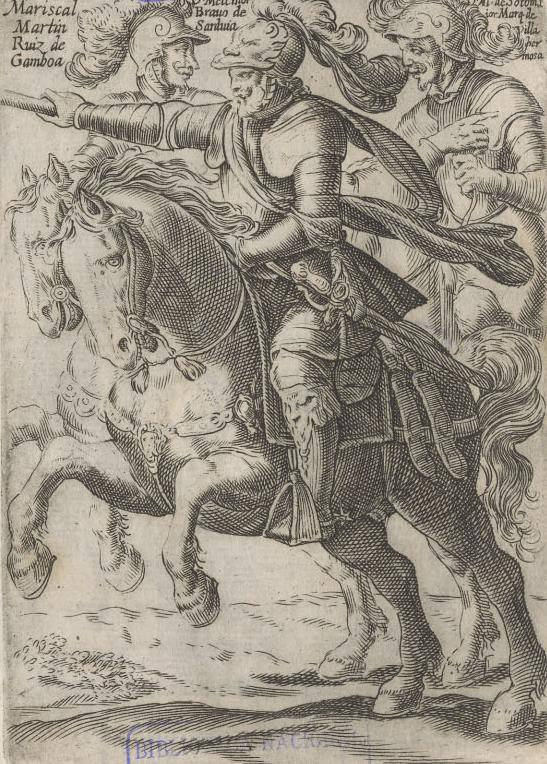
- Martín Ruiz de Gamboa, Melchor Bravo de Saravia and Alonso de Sotomayor

Interim Viceroy of Peru
- In office 21 July 1552 – June 29, 1556
- Monarch: Charles V
- Preceded by: Antonio de Mendoza
- Succeeded by: Andrés Hurtado de Mendoza

Personal details
- Born: 1512 Soria, Crown of Castile
- Died: December 8, 1577 (aged 64–65) Soria, Crown of Castile

Melchor Bravo de Saravia y Sotomayor (1512 – 1577) was a Spanish conquistador, interim viceroy of Peru, and Royal Governor of Chile.

== Early career ==
He was born in Soria, Spain, the son of Juan de Saravia and María Mayor de Vera y Morales. In 1538, he completed his studies at the College of Bologna. He entered the royal service as oidor (judge) in Naples. In 1547, he was named to the Audiencia of Granada. In 1549, he was transferred to America in order to found the Audiencia of New Granada. Later, he was transferred to Lima, where Pedro de La Gasca had reinstalled the Audiencia in 1549. As president of the Audiencia in Lima, he occupied the position of interim Viceroy of Peru from July 1552 to July 1556.

During this time, the Audiencia had to combat the major rebellion of Francisco Hernández Girón. Bravo de Saravia is seen as being one of the major contributors to the eventual defeat and punishment of the rebels, due to his great activity and service during that time.

== As the governor of Chile ==
The Audiencia turned over its governance to the new viceroy of Peru, Andrés Hurtado de Mendoza, 3rd Marquis of Cañete, in 1556. By a royal decree in 1565, King Philip II created the Audiencia of Concepción in Chile. This was intended primarily as a means of ending the ongoing Arauco War with the Mapuches. Besides the usual judicial functions of an audiencia, it was also intended to have governmental functions.

The Audiencia was installed in August 1567, and in September the king named Bravo de Saravia to take over the civil and military government of Chile, with the title of governor. He arrived from Lima in 1568, and served in that position until 1575, when he was replaced by Rodrigo de Quiroga.

In the conduct of the war, he was not very successful. In January 1569, the Spanish were defeated by the Mapuches at the Battle of Catirai. In response, Bravo organized the delivery of supplies to the besieged forts and ordered the evacuation of Arauco and Cañete. He asked for military assistance from Spain and also asked to be relieved of his office.

== Disaster and renewed war ==
On February 8, 1570 a strong earthquake destroyed Concepción. It was accompanied by a tsunami, and aftershocks were felt for months. There were no deaths, but every house was destroyed. Because of a delay between the earthquake and the tsunami, the population was able to escape to higher ground. Nevertheless, they thought the end of the world had arrived.

In the middle of 1570, the reinforcements solicited from Spain arrived in Lima, and in the following spring Bravo reinitiated hostilities with the Indigenous in Chile. Again, defeats followed for the Spanish. Captain Gregorio de Oña was surprised by the Mapuches near the fort of Purén. The governor sent more troops to the south, including his son Ramiro. Again, the Spanish (about 160 of them this time) were taken by surprise near Purén. After this defeat Bravo decided to turn over the military command to Lorenzo Bernal del Mercado and retain only his civil functions.

In 1571 the bishopric of La Imperial was created. The first bishop was the Franciscan Antonio de San Miguel, who arrived in Chile after being consecrated in Lima. San Miguel was opposed to the forced labor being extracted from the Indigenous people, the encomienda system, and the Arauco War, on which he blamed all the misfortunes of the colony. His influence was such that in 1572 King Philip II replaced the forced labor of the Indians with a monetary tax.

During this time construction began on the church of San Francisco in Santiago.

== Criticism of his government ==
There was much criticism of Bravo de Saravia, of both his military and civil abilities. In 1567 Bishop San Miguel described Chile as a "lost land" and informed the king that the governor had transferred the encomienda of Francisco de Villagra to his own son, instead of to Villagra's widow, the rightful heir. Juan López de Porres accused Bravo of corruption and of being a friend to base individuals and an enemy of the conquistadors and the nobles. In October 1569 Fray Antonio de Carvajal complained to Philip II that Bravo did not follow the advice of the experienced conquistadors, and led the Spanish troops from defeat to defeat. Citing the advanced age of the governor, Fray Carvajal asked that the position be given to García Hurtado de Mendoza.

Overwhelmed by the criticism, Bravo made his defense to the king and accused the Audiencia of intriguing against him. Nevertheless, he asked again to be relieved of his office. This time Philip accepted his resignation, in 1573. Bravo returned to Spain two years later, and died in his native city in 1577. He was interred in the principal church in Soria.

Government offices
Preceded by Antonio de Mendoza	Viceroy of Peru; 1552–1556	Succeeded by The Marquis of Cañete
Preceded by Rodrigo de Quiroga	Royal Governor of Chile; 1567–1575	Succeeded by Martín Ruiz de Gamboa
