= Real Audiencia of Concepción =

Legal court in Chile founded in 1565

Before 1565, the highest court of Chile was the justicia mayor, whose sentences were appealed before the Royal Audiencia of Lima. In 1560 local authorities formally requested the president of the Audiencia of Lima for the creation of an audiencia for Chile. It was argued that it would serve to control the actions of the governors of Chile, improve royal treasury's collection of revenue and hasten the end of the Arauco War.

In 1565 King Phillip II ordered the creation of a Chilean audiencia in his decree of May 18. The audiencia had four oidores, one of them serving as president; a fiscal or public prosecutor; and the related subordinate officials, such as an alguacil mayor (greater bailiff) and his lieutenants, notaries public, an interpreter, a chaplain and a doorman. Melchor Bravo de Saravia was appointed President of the Audiencia with a salary of 5,000 pesos.

In cases when the office of the governor of Chile went vacant, the oidores of the Audiencia were to assume administration of the government. Due to various problems in its operation, the Audiencia was dissolved less than a decade later by the royal decree of August 26, 1573, which took effect on June 25, 1575, a month after it received notification of the decree. After it was dissolved the judicial functions of the Audiencia were entrusted to the lieutenant governor and capitán general of Chile.

== Sources ==
- Barrientos Grandon, Javier (1993). "La Real Audiencia de Concepción (1565-1575)," in Revista de estudios histórico-jurídicos de la Universidad Católica de Valparaíso, vol. 1992-1993, no. 15, p. 131-178

Preceded by New creation	President; Melchor Bravo de Saravia; 1565-1575	Succeeded by disbanded
