= Tasa de Esquilache =

The Tasa de Esquilache or Rate of Esquilache was a set of ordinances and taxes established in 1621, by Lope de Ulloa y Lemos, Prince of Esquilache, for the native people of the Captaincy General of Chile similar to those of the earlier Tasa de Gamboa.

== Timing and creation ==
The Tasa was signed March 28, 1620. Pedro Lisperguer y Flores, the procurator general of Santiago, presented the ordinances to the town fathers of Santiago on December 11, 1620, and they were published in Concepción on February 14, 1621 by senior judge (oidor decano) and interim governor, Cristóbal de la Cerda y Sotomayor. Luis de Valdivia was an important collaborator with Esquilache in drafting the ordinances.

== Content of the ordinances ==
The new laws abolished compulsory personal service for all Indians except those over 18 years of age who had been captured in the war between 1608 and 1610. The slave labor system was replaced with forced tribute by the Indians to the Spanish. However, the total amount of work required of the Indians was reduced, and forced labor in mines was abolished, reflecting the transition from mine labor to agriculture in the colony. Tribute was based on the location of residence for Indians, with higher tributes required by those living in La Serena, Santiago, Chillán, and Concepcion, slightly less for those in Cuyo, while much less in the poor provinces of Chiloé. Wages were also set by region. The tasa also established a mit'a system requiring male members of an encomienda to serve as mitayos for a portion of the year during which they were required to serve the colonial government.
