= Rosa Zárate y Ontaneda =

Ecuadorian feminist

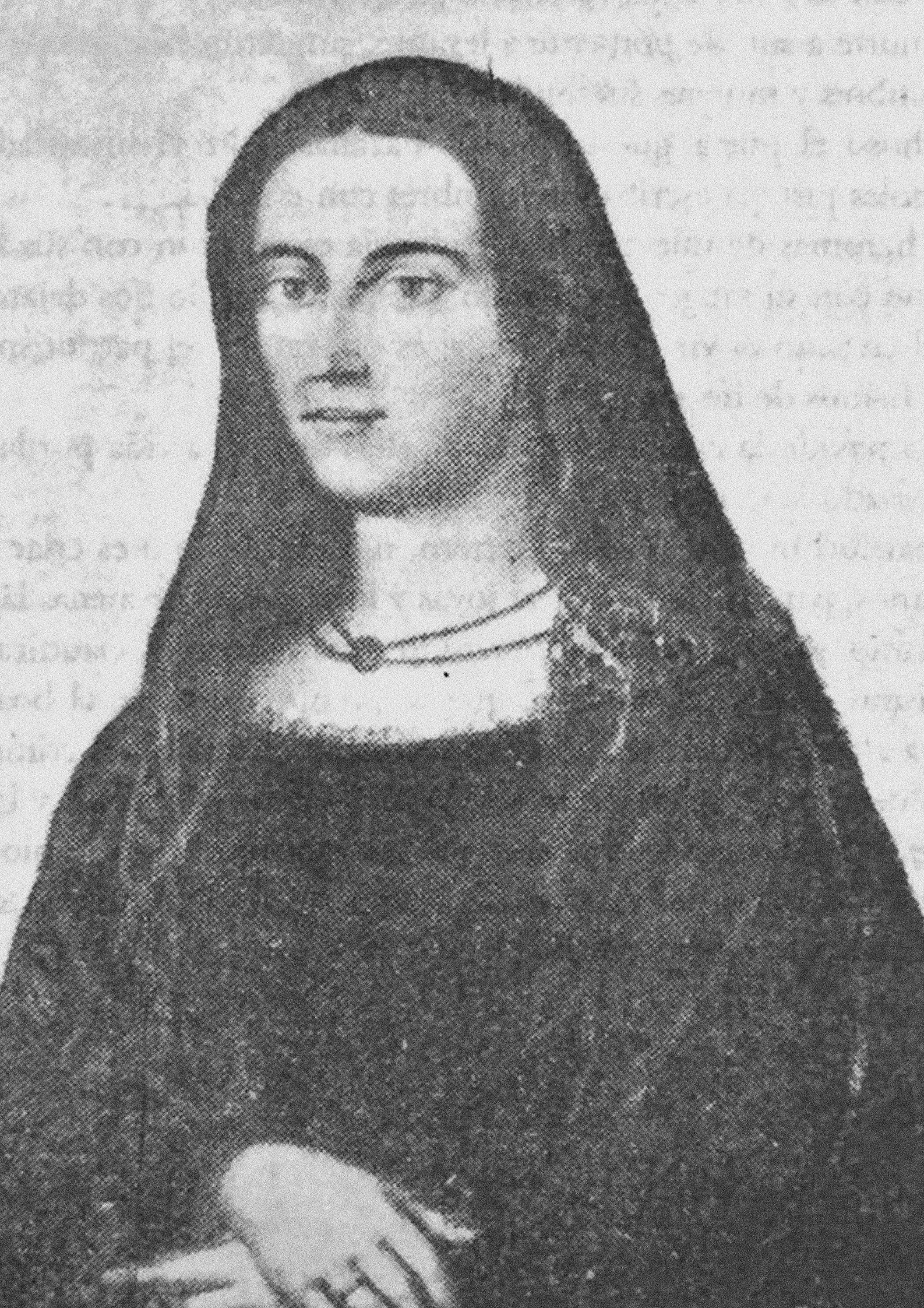
- Born: 1763; Quito, Ecuador
- Died: July 17, 1813; Ecuador
- Occupation: activist
- Spouse: Nicolás de la Peña Maldonado
- Children: 1

Rosa Zárate y Ontaneda (1763 - July 17, 1813), also known simply as Rosa Zárate, was an Ecuadorian feminist involved in the Ecuadorian independence movement during the 19th century.

== Biography ==
Rosa Zárate was the illegitimate child of Mariana Ontaneda Orbe and Gabriel Zárate Gardea, a Spanish lawyer. She was involved in a scandal in 1795 for living with Nicolás de la Peña Maldonado, with whom she wasn't married at the time. She later married him. They had one child, a boy named Antonio.

Zárate and her spouse dedicated themselves to the fight for Ecuadorian independence. Like the patriot Manuela Cañizares, she used her husband and her friends in the fight for independence. At the time, many women held gatherings for patriots in their homes. Zárate and her cousin, María Ontaneda y Larraín, formed a group of female patriots which participated in the early fight for the country's independence.

She was present for the Mutiny of August 2, 1810, during which many Ecuadorian patriots rose up to rebel against Spanish rule. The rebellion was crushed; Zárate y Ontaneda's son, Antonio, was among those killed during the fight. She was also present at the June 1812 attack against the Spanish ruler Manuel Ruiz Urriés de Castilla. He was arrested by the council, stabbed, and imprisoned. He died in prison three days later from his wounds.

In 1813, the colonial government persecuted many politicians and activists, among them Rosa Zárate, Nicolás de la Peña, and their daughter-in-law, Rosaura Vélez. They fled Quito on foot, heading for Esmaraldas in the north. Zárate was accused of arming the people who assassinated Count Ruiz de Castilla.

On July 17, 1813, in the vicinity of La Tola and Esmeraldas, Zárate and her husband were apprehended by Toribio Montes. Montes ordered them to be decapitated; after death, their heads were to be collected and placed in a principal area of Quito as an example to others. Zárate was killed the same day. She became a martyr of the independence movement.

In the memory of Rosa Zárate, schools for women and girls across Ecuador have been given her name; for example, the first girls' school in Salcedo bears her name. The town of Quinindé in the northeast of Ecuador is also known as Rosa Zárate.
