= Flag of Quito =

Municipal flag

The flag of Quito

The flag of the city and canton of Quito is defined by Article 1 of a municipal law known as Ordenanza Municipal N° 1634, passed in 1974, when Sixto Durán Ballén was mayor of Quito. The flag is divided into six equally wide vertical bands, of which the inner four are red and the outer two are blue. Article 1 also recommends that the flags be 2.40 meters by 1.60 meters, which makes it a proportion of 3 by 2. The colors are meant to represent the blood of Quiteños and the seas and skies, respectively, with the red set as Pantone 185 C and the blue as Pantone 281 C. In the center of the flag is the coat of arms of the city, or sometimes only the more simple castle, which symbolizes strength, nobility and loyalty to the city.

== Previous flag ==
Flag of the First Board of Autonomous Government of Quito

The "Patriots of 10 de Agosto" adopted as their flag a red banner with a white sail, to indicate their opposition to Spain, whose military flag was white with the red sail of Saint Andrés (known as the sail of Borgoña). The emblem was used by the quiteño patriots who resisted the Spanish counterattack in 1812. They were captured by the royalist troops of Toribio Montes and Juan de Sámano in the Battle of Ibarra in December of that year. For a large portion of the 20th century, by an error in the transcription of the part of the Battle of Ibarra, it was thought that the quiteño pavilion had been totally red, hung in a "white" horn. Upon the celebrations of the bicentennial of August 10, 1809, this was corrected.
