= Maria Jose Carrion =

Ecuadorian politician

María José Carrión
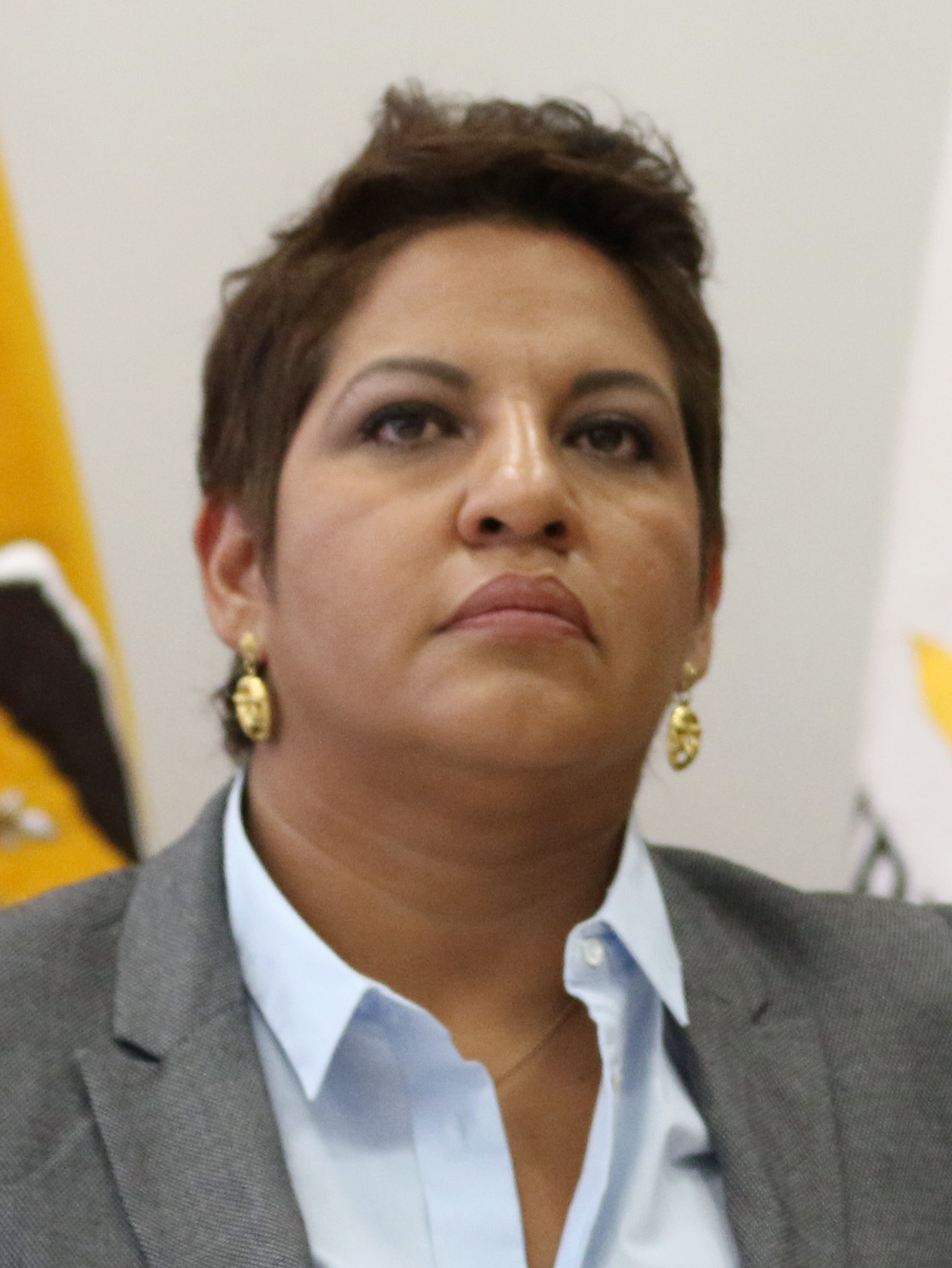
- Born: September 29, 1977 (age 48); Quito
- Occupation: politician
- Known for: member of the National Assembly

María José Carrión (born September 29, 1977) was an Ecuadorian member of parliament from 2013 to 2021. She organised a "International Women in Public Meeting" and led the 'Political Oversight and Control Commission'. She is a candidate for mayor of Quito.

== Life ==
Carrión was born in Quito in 1977 and she trained to be a physician at the ELAM (Latin American School of Medicine) in Cuba. She is qualified to treat family and general medicine.

She and her father, Maria Jose Carrion, were both founders of the Alianza País Movement. She joined the Ecuadorian Constituent Assembly who were tasked with writing a new constitution for Ecuador. The new constitution was approved by the electorate in 2008. In the following year she was involved with teachers and she became a political advisor to the Ministry of Education. She became the Undersecretary of Social Protection of the Ecuadorian Ministry of Public Health in 2011.

In 2012 she was teaching business administration and citizen involvement at the Central University of Ecuador. She also taught at the Universidad Regional Autónoma de los Andes.

She was elected in 2013 to the National Assembly to represent Pichincha. She organised and championed an "International Women in Public Meeting" which was held in November 2013. During her presentation she highlighted notable women including María Chiquinquirá, Manuela Espejo, Rosa Campuzano, Manuela Cañizares, Manuela Sáez, Rosa Zárate, Dolores Cacuango, Transito Amaguaña, Matilde Hidalgo de Procel and Nela Martyes.

In 2016 she was the president of the 'Political Oversight and Control Commission'.

In 2019 her father was chosen as Ecuador's ambassador to Cuba by President Lenin Moreno. The authorities were keen to point out that he was not chosen because of his daughter.

Carrión was a member of the assembly until the 2021 election.

In March 2022 she announced that would be a candidate to be the mayor of her home city, Quito, in the elections of February 2023 representing the Amigo party.
