= Carlos de Montúfar =

Ecuadorian soldier and explorer

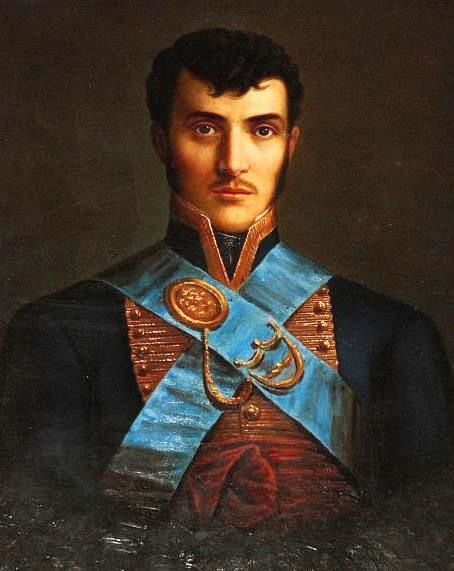
- Born: Carlos de Montúfar y Larrea; November 2, 1780; Quito, Ecuador
- Died: July 31, 1816 (aged 35); Buga, Colombia
- Burial place: Quito Metropolitan Cathedral
- Movement: Spanish American wars of independence

Carlos de Montúfar y Larrea-Zurbano (2 November 1780 – 31 July 1816) was an Ecuadorian nobleman and soldier considered one of the liberators of current Ecuador. He fought alongside Simón Bolívar and was nicknamed El Caudillo.

Born in Quito to the provincial governor, Montúfar spent most of his early life in present-day Ecuador. In 1802 he joined Alexander von Humboldt and Aimé Bonpland on their expedition through the Americas, travelling with them in Ecuador, Peru, Mexico, Cuba, and the United States. He accompanied them on their return to Europe in 1804, where he spent time with a young Bolívar in Paris before joining the Spanish military in 1805.

Montúfar returned to Ecuador in 1810, where he fought as a revolutionary in the Spanish American wars of independence. He was captured and executed in Buga, Colombia in 1816 at the age of 35. In 1922, his remains were relocated to Quito as part of the centennial celebration of the liberators of Ecuador.

== Early life ==
Montúfar was the third son of the Creole nobles Juan Pío de Montúfar y Larrea, II Marquis of Selva Alegre, and Teresa de Larrea y Villavicencio. His father was the provincial governor of Quito, and between 1809 and 1812 he was involved in the independence movement that served as a forerunner to the independence of Ecuador. His sister Rosa was a "noted beauty" in Ecuadorian high society.

Montúfar graduated in 1800 from St. Thomas Aquinas University, one of the first institutions of higher education in the Americas, where he studied philosophy and the humanities.

== Travels with Alexander von Humboldt ==
In 1802, Montúfar met the German explorer and scientist Alexander von Humboldt, who arrived in Quito in January after almost three years spent travelling through South America. He was invited to join Humboldt and the French botanist Aimé Bonpland for the remainder of their expedition. This decision was met with jealousy by some, since despite being a "quick learner" Montúfar lacked a scientific background; Colombian inventor Francisco José de Caldas had asked earlier to join the expedition but been turned down, leading him to complain that the attractive young Montúfar had only been brought along on the journey with Humboldt as "his Adonis".

Montúfar accompanied Humboldt and Bonpland for the next two years, including their visits to many of the peaks and Volcanoes of the Andes — most notably their ascent of Chimborazo, the highest mountain in Ecuador and the farthest point from the center of the Earth, in June 1802 – as well as travels throughout Ecuador, Peru, Mexico, Cuba, and the United States.

In 1803 the group sailed from Guayaquil to Mexico, which was Montúfar's first experience outside of the tropics:

"During a trip from a harbor on the Pacific, across Mexico, and on to Europe, I was an eyewitness to the strange and frightful impression that the first sight of a pine forest near Chilpanzingo made upon one of our companions who, having been born in Quito at the equator, had never before seen conifers and folia acerosa. To him the trees seemed leafless, and since we were travelling toward the frigid North, he believed that he was already perceiving, in this ultimate contraction of the organs, the impoverishing influence of the pole."

— Alexander von Humboldt, Views of Nature, Ideas for a Physiognomy of Plants

In May 1804, Thomas Jefferson, then president of the United States, invited Humboldt to Washington, D.C. to discuss the findings from his journey as well as gain political insight on certain regions of the Americas. Montúfar joined Humboldt in Washington and met many contemporary figures in American politics, since news of the expedition created heavy interest in the travelers upon their arrival in the capital.

== Military career ==
Montúfar accompanied Humboldt on his return to Europe in 1804, sailing from the United States to France and immediately settling in Paris. Here he spent much of his time with Humboldt, who he lived with, and a group of fellow young South Americans – including future revolutionary Simón Bolívar, who was 21 years old at the time and also living in Paris.

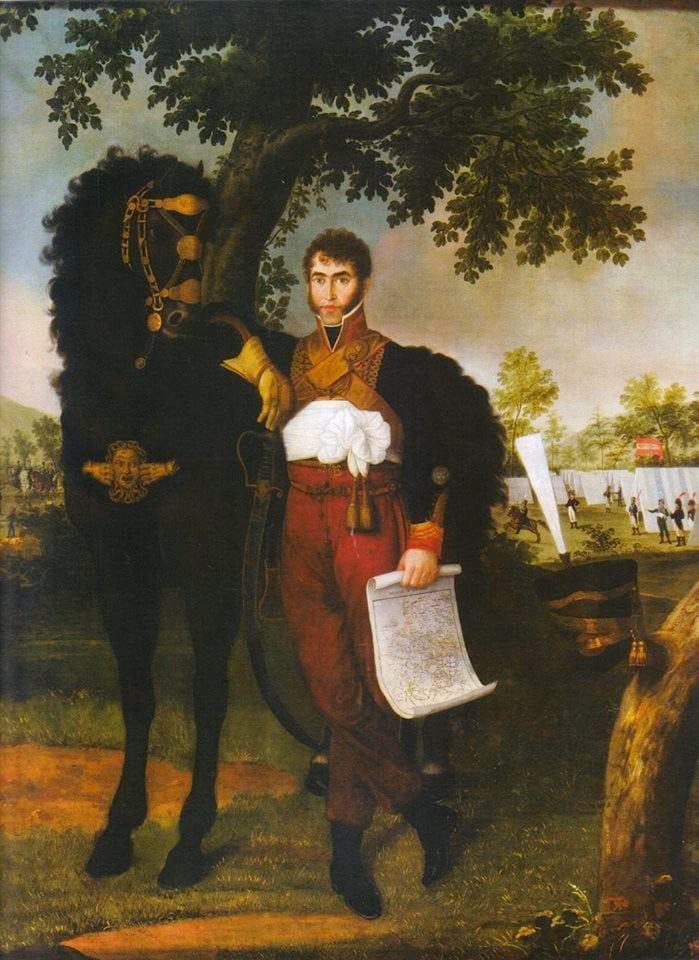
Carlos de Montúfar y Larrea, Royal Commissioner of Quito.

In 1805 Montúfar moved to Madrid, Spain to begin his military training at the Royal Academy of Nobles. He fought against the Napoleonic army in the Peninsular War, serving as aide-de-camp to General Francisco Javier Castaños in the Battle of Bailén in 1808, considered Napoleon's first military defeat. He was appointed in Cádiz by the Supreme Central Board as royal commissioner for the Court of Quito, with broad autonomy from the viceroys of Peru and New Granada.

Being informed that his father had taken part in the Quito Revolution, Montúfar decided to join the cause and fight against the Spanish; he returned to Quito in 1810 and participated in the formation of the short-lived State of Quito, which declared itself independent from Spain and created its own constitution under the presidency of Bishop José de Cuero y Caicedo. Montúfar took charge of the military defense of the new state and entered into combat with the forces of Toribio Montes, Melchor Aymerich and Juan de Sámano.

On 1 December 1812, the revolutionaries were defeated in the Battle of Ibarra, but Montúfar managed to flee and hid in several haciendas in Cayambe and the Los Chillos Valley. He was arrested, tried for treason and deported to Spain, via Guayaquil and Panama. Upon arriving in Panama, he managed to flee and joined the Liberation Army in New Granada, where he reached the rank of colonel and fought in the southern area of present-day Colombia. He fought in the Pasto Campaign under the orders of General Manuel Roergas Serviez, which ended with the complete defeat of the revolutionary army.

== Death ==
On June 29, 1816, Montúfar participated in the war of independence of New Granada in the Battle of Cuchilla del Tambo. The revolutionaries were defeated and many independence fighters, including Caldas, were captured and executed. Montúfar was also captured and sentenced to death by Spanish General Juan de Sámano. He was shot in the back, as a traitor, in the city of Buga on July 31, 1816; he was 35 years old.

Years after his death, when writing about his expedition through South America, Humboldt paid tribute to Montúfar and his role in the movements for independence:

"The traveller, whose impressions I describe here and whose name Bonpland and I cannot utter without a pang of sorrow, was a fine young man, the son of the Marques de Selvalegre, don Carlos Montufar, who, not many years later, courageously met a violent but honorable death in the war of independence that rose from the Spanish colonies' noble and impassioned love of freedom."

— Alexander von Humboldt, Views of Nature, Ideas for a Physiognomy of Plants

== Personal life ==
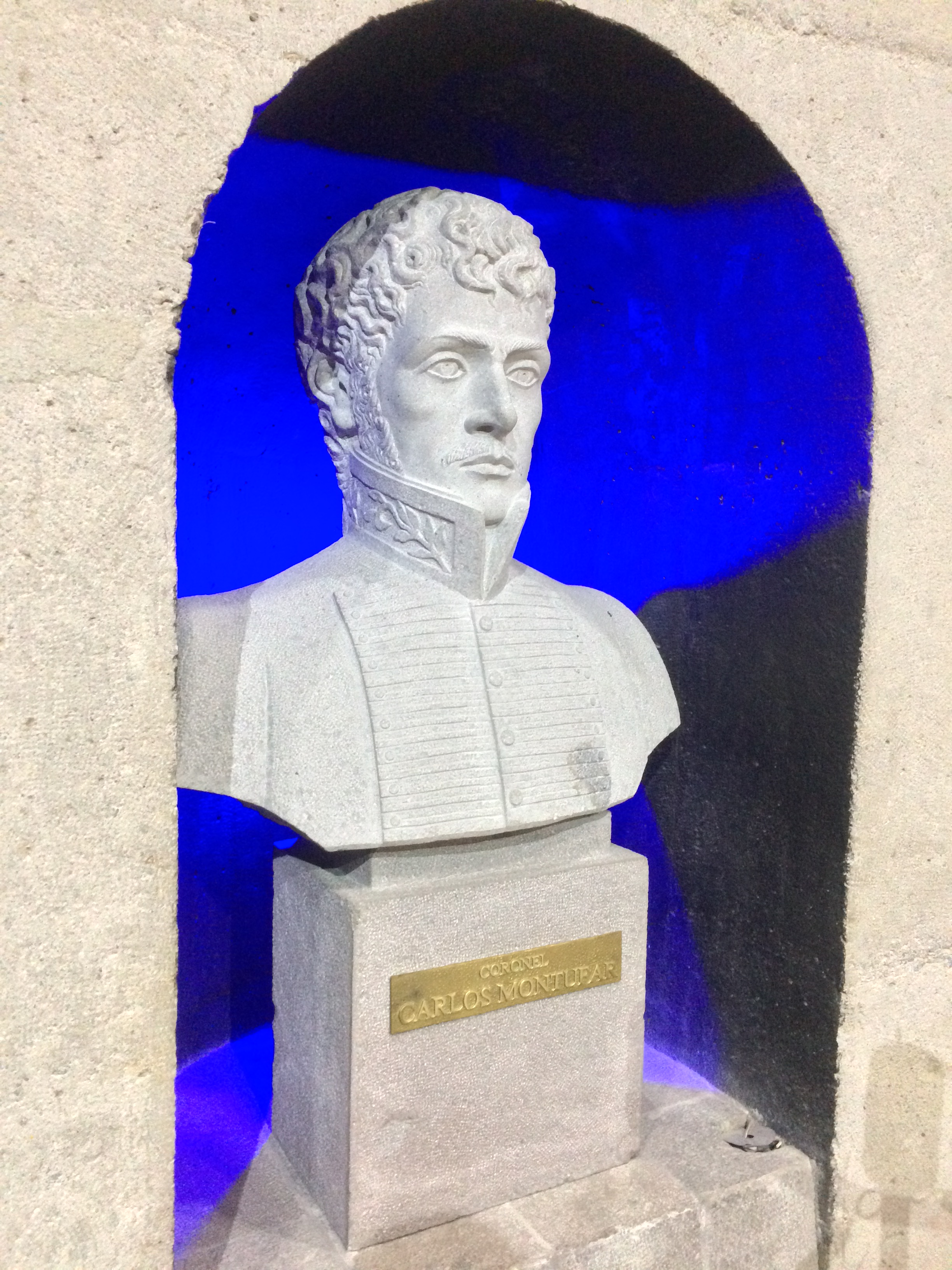
Bust in the "Temple of the Fatherland" in Quito.

Montúfar was handsome with "dark curly hair and almost black eyes", and he "carried himself tall and proud". He never married. Some sources attribute him as having a relationship with Quito noblewoman Antonia Vela Bustamante around 1811; however, she was living in Latacunga at the time and he was heavily involved in the independence movement, making such a relationship unlikely.

Rumors that Montúfar and Humboldt were lovers have circulated since the 19th century, in large part due to claims made by Caldas as well as Humboldt's frequent intense relationships with men and likely homosexuality. Humboldt wrote in his own accounts of the expedition that they shared a bed during their travels through the Andes. The two were reportedly very close: when Montúfar fell ill while climbing Antisana, "throughout the night Humboldt rose repeatedly to fetch water and administer compresses", tending to his sick friend until he was well enough to reach the summit. Andrea Wulf argues in her 2015 biography of Humboldt that his relationship with Montúfar likely stayed platonic, although it was notably emotionally intense.

== Reburial and legacy ==
As part of the centennial anniversary of the Battle of Pichincha, Montúfar's remains were repatriated from Buga, Colombia to his hometown of Quito in 1922. He is interred in Quito Metropolitan Cathedral.

The moth species Hellinsia montufari, which is native to the Carchi Province of Ecuador, is named after Montúfar.
