= Juan de Salinas y Zenitagoya =

Spanish officer (1755–1810)

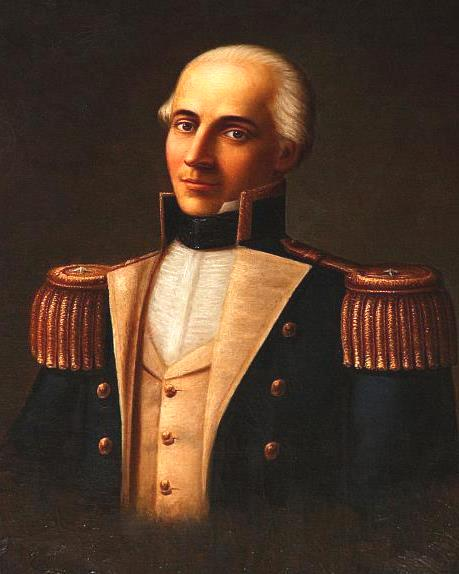
Juan de Salinas y Zenitagoya (1755-1810)

Juan de Salinas (November 24, 1755 – August 2, 1810) was a Spanish officer in the latter days of the colonial period in what is now Ecuador. He played a key role in the independence movement as the first military leader of the patriotic militias.

== Biography ==
Juan de Salinas was born in the town of Sangolqui, near the Ecuadorian capital of Quito, on November 24, 1755. His father was Diego Salinas, a man of Basque descent who was sent to the Americas as governor of Yaguarzongo, and his mother was Maria de Zenitagoya, from a wealthy Quito family. He studied philosophy and law at Santo Tomas University in Quito, but decided to pursue a military career, becoming an officer in the escort of José Diguja, President of the Real Audiencia of Quito.

In that capacity he was ordered to pacify the area around Otavalo, which was experiencing an uprising of the indigenous peoples. Returning from this campaign around 1778, he was sent with Apolinar Diez de la Fuente, who had just opened a route from Quito to Quijos in the Amazon, to define the border with Brazil. They reached the Marañón river around April 1780, but Salinas fell ill and had to return to Pevas. Once recovered he spent the next few years exploring the Amazonian jungle, but in 1783 he became ill again and was ordered back to the highlands, where he was stationed in the military garrison of the Royal Audiencia of Quito. In that city he married Maria de la Vega y Nates in 1794. By 1801 he was commanding the military corps stationed in Quito and seemed to be very popular with the troops for his generous character and proven valor.

Around 1803 he was sent on a mission that took him and his troops all the way the Isthmus of Panama, where he encountered trouble with the local authorities. On his return to Quito he found a city in conflict, divided into two factions: the capetones, or European-born Spaniards, and the criollos (American-born Spaniards). The criollo elites resented the way in which the Spanish-born were preferred for high-level bureaucratic appointments. Salinas joined the group of local criollos that espoused somewhat liberal ideas of self-government. On December 25, 1808, he went to the meeting that Juan Pío Montúfar, Marques de Selva Alegre had arranged on his estate in the valley of Chillos. Here the "revolutionary" group decided to establish a Supreme Junta to govern the Royal Audiencia of Quito.
But only in August 1809 did the group find their opportunity, using Napoleon's invasion of Spain to justify the creation of an autonomous government in the Audiencia. While declaring loyalty to King Ferdinand VII of Spain, they took power from the appointed Spanish representatives. On the morning of August 10 Salinas went to the barracks he commanded and convinced the troops that it was their patriotic duty to resist the French usurpation. He took three battalions into the streets to start the revolt and gain effective power in the capital. Salinas was given the rank of colonel by the Junta, while the Marques de Selva Alegre, somewhat forcedly, was given overall command of the government and the small army. It was a poorly organized and ill-equipped group. The noble (titled) leaders were uncomfortable with the radical turn the revolt had taken, as they had wanted better treatment from Madrid, not a complete severing of ties from the mother country.

It took the Royal forces less than two months to organize a counterrevolution. On October 13 the Marques de Selva Alegre offered his resignation to the Junta and was replaced by his kinsman the Count of Selva Florida, who started talks with Manuel Ruiz Urriés de Castilla, Count of Ruiz de Castilla, the deposed Royal representative of Spain. The viceroy of Peru sent troops under the command of Manuel de Arredondo. They arrived in Quito on November 24, promptly took over the city and returned Ruiz de Castilla to power.

Salinas was imprisoned on December 4 and taken to the military barracks, charged with treason. He spent the next eight months imprisoned in the military dungeons with other "conspirators". His wife and daughters were under house arrest, but arranged for a group of Patriots to try to free her husband. On August 2, 1810, when the Patriots tried to liberate them, the 31 imprisoned men were butchered by their guards as they lay in their cells. His wife and daughters were taken to be hanged in the central plaza, but the nuns of the Convent of Concepcion intervened and gave them refuge. Salinas's youngest daughter Maria del Carmen, who was born while he was in captivity, married Manuel de Ascásubi, who also took part in the independence process and helped in the formation of the young Ecuadorian nation. The family was persecuted and their holdings expropriated until the War of Independence ended in 1822, and the victorious Marshal Antonio José de Sucre returned to Salinas's heirs all that had been taken. Juan de Salinas is remembered as the first military leader in what is now Ecuador and one of the first martyrs of the Wars of Independence.
