= Misión Solidaria Manuela Espejo =

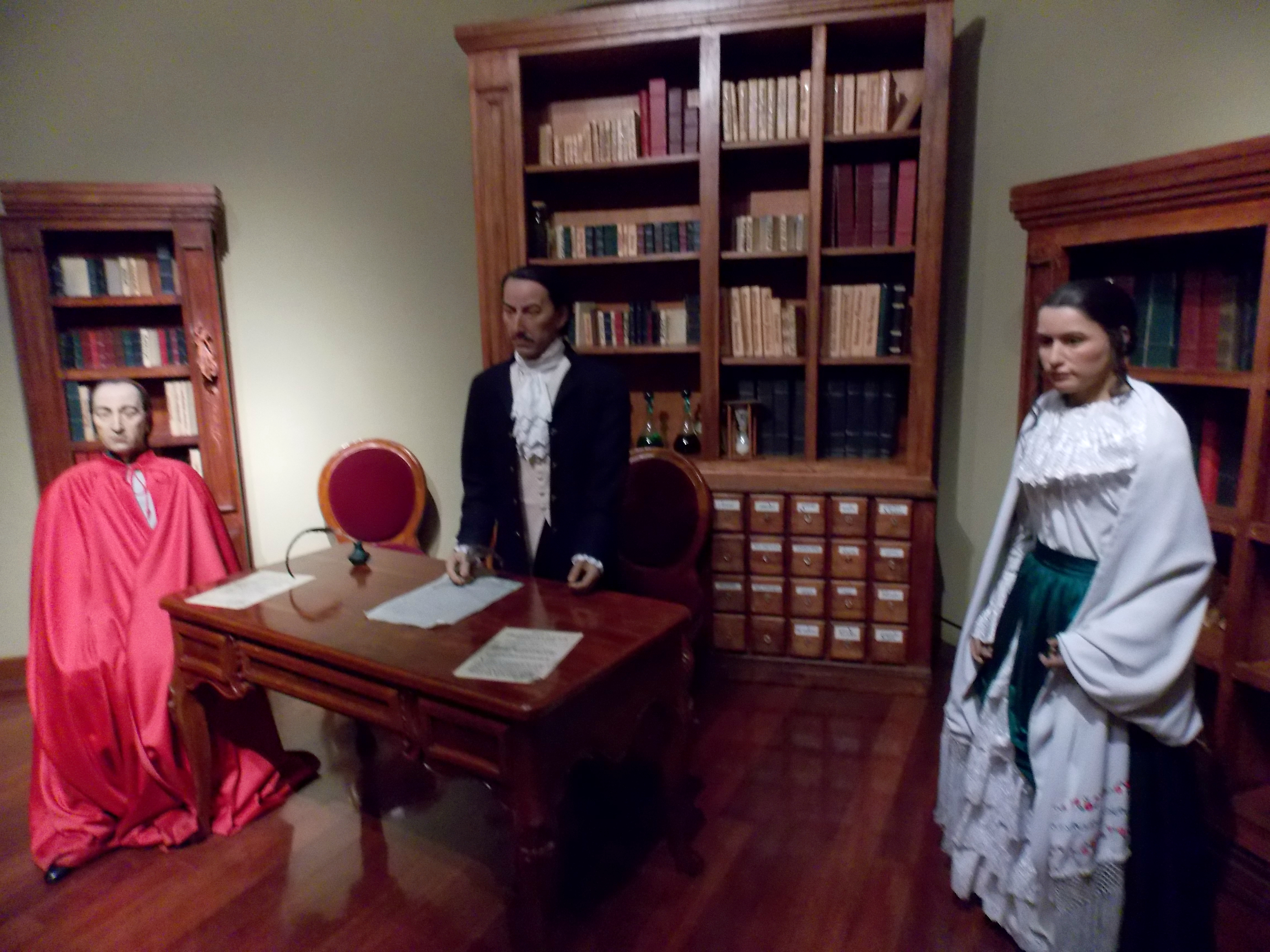
Wax representations of Manuela Espejo (right) with her brother Eugenio in the Alberto Mena Caamaño Museum.

The Misión Solidaria Manuela Espejo (Manuela Espejo Solidarity Mission) is part of an Ecuadorian social investigation for studying, registering, and georeferencing disabled people. This allows information about who these people are, how many of them they are, where they are, how they are, and what they need to be recorded and used accordingly.

As a result of this mission, the Joaquín Gallegos Lara Program was put into place. It allots an economic bonus to caregivers for those with severe physical or mental disabilities.

The mission was created after an agreement between Ecuador and Cuba, where 229 Cuban and 120 Ecuadorian medical specialists achieved the first phase of the diagnosis in the medical investigation on the causes of disabilities. It had given a complete diagnosis to areas within the country that had only just received primary development, such as genetic clinics.

The mission sought to use its findings to create better legislation in areas such as health, education, and social well-being. This investigation arose after an era of very little legitimate research being done in regards to disabilities, and subsequently, skimpy government plans to assist disabled people.

For the first time in Ecuadorian history, doctors, geneticists, psychologists, and health specialists were accompanied by military and community guides to document and provide support for disabled people.

From July 2009 to November 2010, 825,576 medical attendants visited 1,286,331 homes in 24 provinces and 221 cantons in Ecuador. Of these places, 294,611 disabled people were located, studied, and given proper care. 26,327 critical cases were recorded, meaning that Ecuador had a prevalence of 2.43% of people with disabilities nationwide.

The mission supplied its subjects with aids such as anti-slip mattresses and cushions, wheelchairs, canes of various types, diapers, mattress protectors, bonds up to $240, medical care, and housing. This was in addition to an increased fight for their equal rights, access to rehab, adequate nutrition, and psychological care.

Each brigade consisted of a health specialist, military personnel, a driver and a volunteer, who were responsible for delivering the aid to each household.

As of January 2012, 265,515 technical aids have been delivered to 130,254 beneficiaries. The mission has also promoted the construction of 4,400 homes between 2010 and 2011 and is expected to build 6,000 more in 2012. This work planned for 2012 will be carried out in the provinces of Zamora, Morona, Loja, El Oro, Galapagos, Guayas and Pichincha for the benefit of 85,891 people with disabilities, who already studied and cared for.

The vice-presidency of Ecuador grants the Manuela Espejo Order to those who have shown excellence in their service. Among the Cuban, Ecuadorian, and Venezuelan medical recipients decorated is the Cuban leader Fidel Castro.
