= Rosa de Montúfar =

Ecuadorian independence figure (1783–1860)

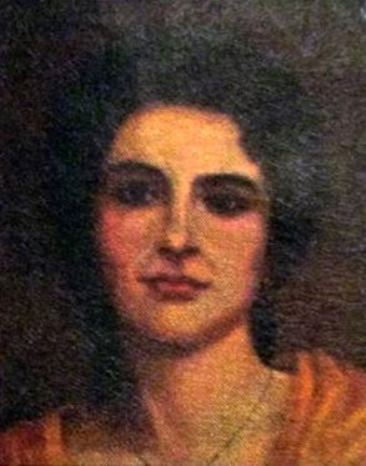
- Born: Rosa de Montúfar y Larrea-Zurbano; 1783; Quito, Viceroyalty of New Granada
- Died: 12 November 1860 (aged 76–77); Quito, Ecuador
- Occupation: Revolutionary
- Spouse: Vicente Aguirre

Rosa de Montúfar y Larrea-Zurbano (1783 - 12 November 1860) was a noblewoman and aristocrat from Quito, the daughter of Juan Pío Montúfar and a prominent hero of the Ecuadorian War of Independence.

== Biography ==
Montúfar was born in Quito at the end of 1783, although the exact date is unknown. Her parents were Juan Pío Montúfar, second Marquis of Selva Alegre, and aristocrat Josefa Teresa de Larrea y Villavicencio, who baptized her on 17 December of the same year. Rosa was the fifth of six siblings, two of whom did not reach adulthood: Francisco Javier (1775–1853), Juan José (1777–1779), Carlos (1780–1816), Joaquín (1782–1850) and Juan (1787–1788).

In 1790, her maternal uncle, priest Domingo Larrea y Villavicencio, inherited a lot of jewels for a value of 600 pesos, which he had bought from the girl's mother before her early death, which occurred that same year when Montúfar had just seven years old. In 1798, her father requested for her the benefits of a clause in Captain Manrique de Lara's will, which would favor a noble and poor girl with a large sum of money. Although the girl belonged to one of the most important noble families of the then Real Audiencia de Quito, she was definitely not poor, however President Luis Muñoz y Guzmán assigned a part of her benefits to her.

Montúfar was described as a distinguished lady, with a haughty bearing and luminous blue eyes, physical qualities to which added a determined character. Her careful education, the fruit of her father's enlightened thought, was reflected when she had to successfully take over family estates between 1809 and 1812.

=== Marriage and offspring ===
On 24 January 1815, Montúfar married the pro-independence general Vicente Aguirre y Mendoza, with whom she had two children.
