= Escuela de la Concordia =

Patriotic society

The Escuela de la Concordia (Spanish for the 'School of Concord' or 'Agreement'), also known as the Patriotic Society of the Friends of the Country of Quito (Spanish: Sociedad Patriótica de Amigos del País de Quito) was an influential society in Spanish South America during the 1790s. It was centered in Quito, the capital of the Royal Audience of Quito, but also had members in Bogotá, Guayaquil, Riobamba, and Ibarra. It promoted Enlightenment thought and nationalism in the discussion of regional affairs and is seen as a precursor to Quitonian independence as the Republic of Ecuador.

== History ==
The society was inspired by the "Discourse to the Illustrious and Loyal City of Quito" (Note: Fully, the "Discourse to the Very Illustrious and Very Loyal City of Quito, Represented by its Illustrious Cabildo, Judiciary, and Regiment and to All Gentlemen Resolved on the Erection of a Patriotic Society on the Necessity of its Establishment, Later, with the title of 'School of Concord'" (Spanish: Discurso dirigido a la muy ilustre y muy leal ciudad de Quito, representada por su ilustrísimo Cabildo, Justicia y Regimiento, y a todos los señores socios provistos a la erección de una Sociedad Patriótica, sobre la necesidad de establecerla, luego, con el título de "Escuela de la Concordia").) published by the Quitonian native Dr. Eugenio de Santa Cruz y Espejo during his visit to the viceregal capital Bogotá in 1789.

The society was founded two years later as the "Patriotic Society of the Friends of the Country" by 23 creoles and mestizos who met at the University of St Gregory the Great (now Quito's Metropolitan Cultural Center) on 30 November 1791. They pledged to meet once a week to address issues concerning education, science, agriculture, commerce, politics, and the arts. The Patriotic Society soon became better known by Espejo's earlier name, the Escuela de la Concordia. Under his editorship, it published the audience's first newspaper Primicias de la Cultura de Quito in 1792.

The group had expected royal approval but this was rejected via official decree on 11 November 1793. (Note: The relevant text read that "Disapproving that you have begun the establishment of the aforementioned Society, Friends of the Country, without having earlier received my royal approval under the laws that prohibit such groups without this circumstance, I resolve that I command your exercise is suspended pending my royal determination" (Desaprobando hubieseis puesto en ejecución el establecimiento de la referida Sociedad amigos del país, sin que hubiese precedido mi Real aprobación con arreglo a las leyes que prohíben toda junta sin esta circunstancia, he resuelto que como os mando se suspenda su ejercicio hasta mi Real determinación.).) The group ceased official activity shortly thereafter, with Espejo's death ending the last of its operations by 1796.

== Members ==
Name	Occupation	Location	Notes
Miguel de Jijón and León	1st Count of Casa Jijón	Quito	1st president
Juan José Guerrero and Matheu	5th Count of Selva Florida	Quito	1st director
Eugenio de Santa Cruz y Espejo	lawyer	Quito	1st secretary
Francisco Javier Salazar	lawyer	Quito	founding member
Francisco de la Graña	clergyman	Quito	founding member
Sancho de Escobar	writer	Quito	founding member
Ramón Yépez	writer	Quito	founding member
Juan José Boniche	writer	Quito	founding member
Juan Larrea	writer	Quito	founding member
José de Cuero y Caicedo	bishop	Quito	
José Antonio Pérez Calama	bishop	Quito	
Juan Pío Montúfar	2nd Marquis of Selva Alegre	Quito	
Jacinto Sánchez de Orellana	2nd Marquis of Villa de Orellana	Quito	
Manuel de Larrea y Jijón	1st Marquis of San José	Ibarra	
Francisco Luis Héctor de Carondelet	Baron de Carondelet	Quito	
Juan Pablo Arenas	lawyer	Quito	
Javier de Ascázubi y Matheu	lawyer	Quito	
Francisco Antonio Zea	lawyer	Bogotá	
Antonio Nariño	soldier	Bogotá	
Magdalena Dávalos y Maldonado	magnate	Riobamba	
Pedro de Montúfar	soldier	Ibarra	
Jacinto de Bejarano	soldier	Guayaquil	

== Legacy ==
Although the School of Concord was short-lived, it has been remembered in Ecuadorian history as an important precursor and harbinger of the local resistance that established Ecuador's independence over the next few decades and transferred political power from the Spanish to local creole elites.

== See also ==
- Economic Societies of the Friends of the Country

== Bibliography ==
- "Ecuador" , Encyclopædia Britannica, 9th ed., Vol. VII, New York: Charles Scribner's Sons, 1878, p. 649.
- "Escuela de la Concordia". Enciclopedia del Ecuador (in Spanish). Especiales.
