= Juan Pío Montúfar =

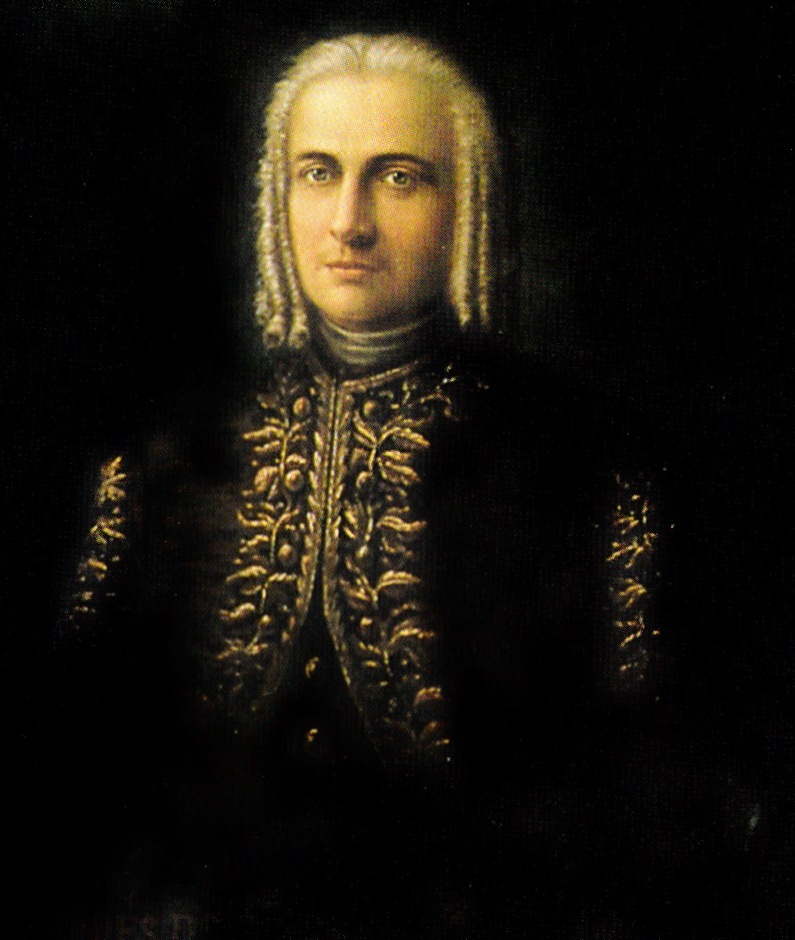
Juan Pio Montufar, II Marquis de Selva Alegre

Juan Pío de Montúfar y Larrea (Quito,29 May 1758 - Alcalá de Guadaira, Spain, 3 October 1818), II Marquis de Selva Alegre, was a statesman and political figure during the struggle for independence from Spain in Latin America.

== Biography ==
He was the son of Spaniard Juan Pío de Montúfar y Frasso, first Marquis of Selva Alegre and President of the Royal Audiencia of Quito from 1753 to 1761. He married Teresa Larrea y Villavicencio and had 6 children including Carlos Montúfar and Rosa de Montúfar.
He became inspired by the ideas of Enlightenment and a friend of Eugenio Espejo, Antonio Nariño, Francisco José de Caldas, and Manuela Cañizares.

On 10 August 1809, a group of Criollo Revolutionary intellectuals in the city of Quito deposed the Spanish ruler Manuel Ruiz Urriés de Castilla, and formed a provisional Junta, of which he became president.

This event is known in Ecuador and other countries in the region as the First Cry of Hispanic American Independence, because it constituted the beginning of the emancipation process of Latin America.

Lack of support from the masses, disagreements among members of the Junta itself, as well as opposition from the governors of a number of departments led to the curtailment of the movement. Montúfar informed José Fernando de Abascal y Sousa, Viceroy of Peru of his willingness to work for the restoration of the legitimate Government. He escaped the imprisonment and execution of the other conspirators.

His son Carlos Montúfar, who had arrived in Quito with the position of Royal Commissioner, formed a second Junta of which he was named vice president. But, like the first, this second Junta also had a very short duration.

Three years later, by order of General Toribio Montes, Montúfar was taken prisoner and sent to Loja, chained and in irons. His assets, estates and properties were confiscated, and at the beginning of 1818 he was exiled to Cádiz, Spain. There he spent his last days in prison and died on 15 October of that same year 1818.

== Sources ==
- Real Academia de la Historia
- Enciclopedia del Ecuador
