= Magdalena Dávalos y Maldonado =

Ecuadorian scholar (1725–1806)

- Born: Magdalena Antonia Dávalos y Maldonado; Chambo, Ecuador
- Baptised: February 9, 1725
- Died: January 8, 1806 (aged 80); Guano, Ecuador
- Other names: María Magdalena Dávalos y Maldonado
- Occupation: Erudit

Magdalena Dávalos y Maldonado (1725-1806) was an Ecuadorian scholar and literary figure. She was famous for her education, academic knowledge and literary talents in contemporary Ecuador, and was the only female member of the famous literary society Escuela de la Concordia.

== See also ==
- María Estefanía Dávalos y Maldonado
