= Manuela de la Santa Cruz y Espejo =

Ecuadorian journalist (1753–1829)

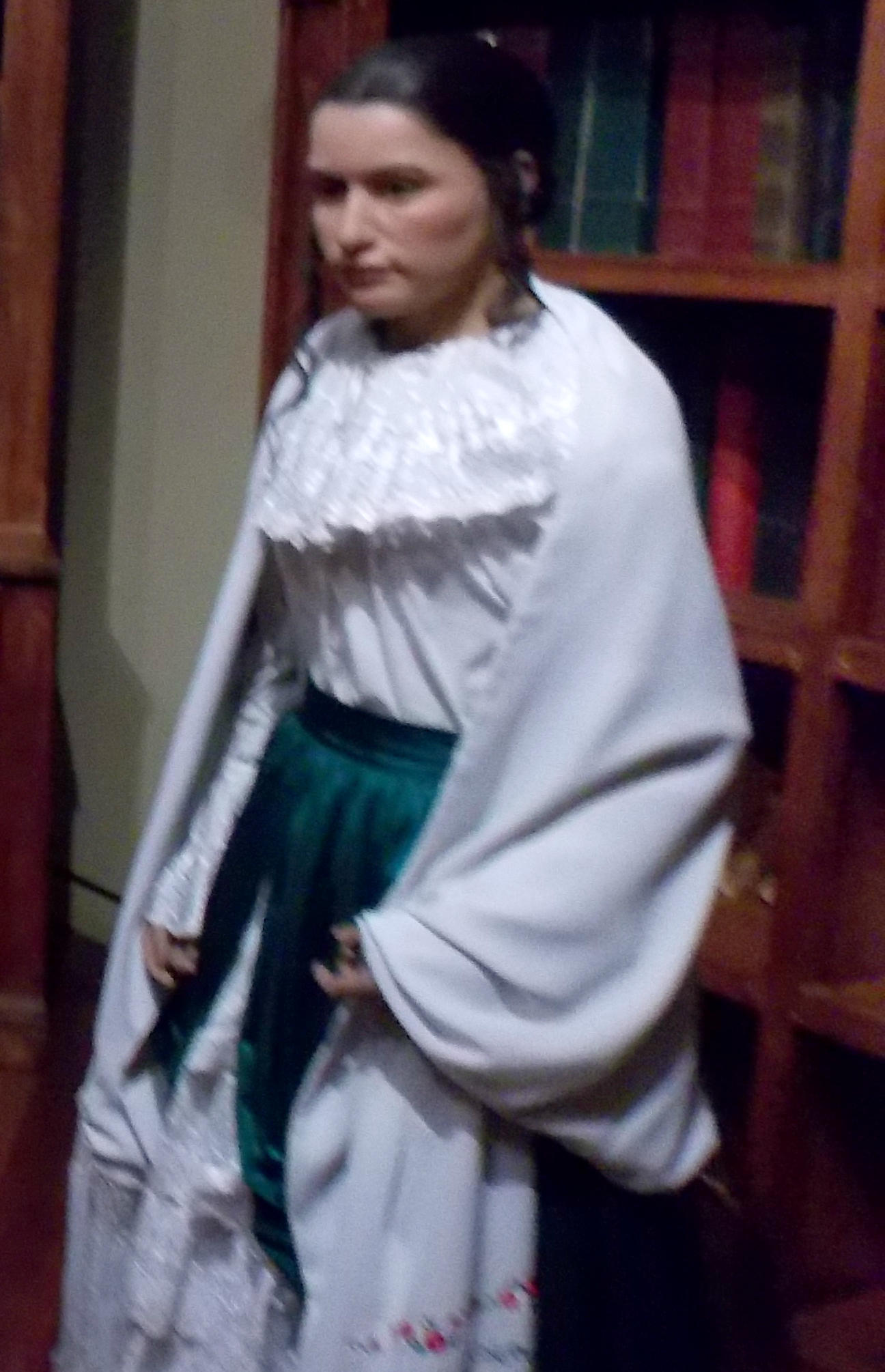
- Wax statue of Manuela de la Santa Cruz y Espejo at the Alberto Mena Caamaño Museum
- Born: María Manuela Dominga de Espejo y Aldaz; 20 December 1753; Quito, Viceroyalty of New Granada
- Died: 1829 (aged 75–76); Quito, Gran Colombia
- Occupations: Journalist, nurse
- Spouse: José Mejía Lequerica
- Parents: Luis Espejo (father); Catalina Aldaz (mother)
- Relatives: Eugenio Espejo (brother)

María Manuela Dominga de Espejo y Aldaz, also known as Manuela de la Santa Cruz y Espejo (b. 20 December 1753 – d. 1829) was an Ecuadorian journalist, nurse, feminist, and revolutionary. She was the sister of Eugenio Espejo, with whom she discussed and shared Enlightenment and revolutionary, pro-revolutionary thought and ideas.

== Biography ==
María Manuela Dominga de Espejo y Aldaz, the name that appears in the baptism records of La Iglesia de El Sagrario, was born on 20 December 1753 in Quito, then the capital of the Real Audiencia of the same name, part of the Spanish Empire. She was the fifth and final daughter of Luis Espejo and Catalina Aldaz, a teacher of medicines and natural sciences. Espejo married José Mejía Lequerica, a lawyer 22 years her junior, in the Church of El Sagrario. Their marriage was sponsored by Juan de Dios Morales and his wife, María Oleas. Despite the shared interests in independence from Spain and science, de Espejo left to work as the deputy of the Cortes of Cádiz and struck up a relationship with Gertrudis Sanalova y Benito, an Andalusian. Sanalova became de Espejo's heir universal when she died. Espejo would live next to the family of Juan de Dios Morales.

Espejo would accompany her brother Eugenio as a nurse during medical visits, and both would be present in the relief effort mounted after yellow fever struck Quito in 1785. She would care for another of her siblings, Juan Pablo de Espejo, when he became ill in 1764, putting her in the running for Ecuador's first nurse. Her medical knowledge was aided by the inheritance of Lorenzo Heinster's 26-volume encyclopedia of medicine.

Espejo wrote for a Quito newspaper under the pseudonym "Erophilia" to defend her brothers against the accusations of the Spanish government and published manifestos advocating for better treatment of women and the impoverished.
