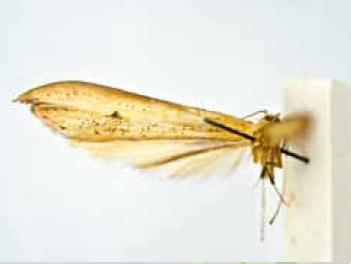

Scientific classification
- Kingdom: Animalia
- Phylum: Arthropoda
- Class: Insecta
- Order: Lepidoptera
- Family: Pterophoridae
- Genus: Hellinsia
- Species: H. montufari

Binomial name
- Hellinsia montufari Gielis, 2011

= Hellinsia montufari =

Species of plume moth

Hellinsia montufari is a moth of the family Pterophoridae. It is found in Ecuador.

The wingspan is 28 mm. Adults are on wing in January, at an altitude of 3,250 meters

== Etymology ==
The species is named after Montufar, an Ecuadorian freedom fighter, opposing the Spanish.
