= Manuel Ruiz Urriés de Castilla =

Spanish politician

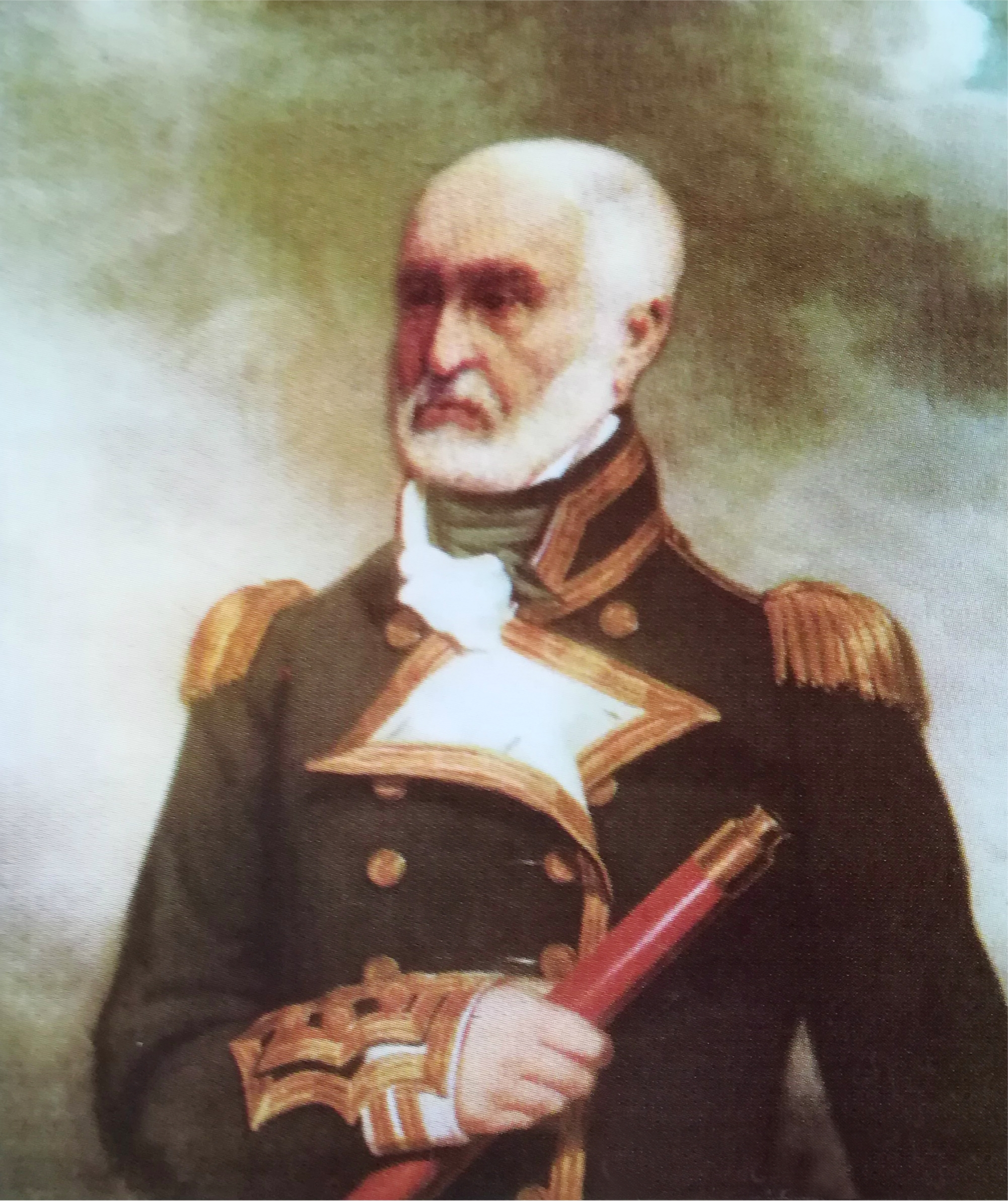
Manuel Ruiz Urriés de Castilla, around 1800

Manuel Ruiz Urriés de Castilla, I Count of Ruiz de Castilla ( Ortilla (Spain), 23 November 1734 – Quito (Ecuador), June 1812), was a brigadier of the Royal Army of Spain and a public official of the Spain crown in South America. He held the positions of Mayor of the Mines of Huancavelica, Governor General of Cuzco, and President of the Real Audiencia of Cusco (1793–1806) and of the Real Audiencia of Quito (1807–1812).

== Biography ==
Born in Spain, he moved to the Viceroyalty of Peru, where he was mayor of Paruro and colonel of militias, during the Rebellion of Túpac Amaru II. He distinguished himself in 1781, commanding one of the columns that attacked the rebels in Tungasuca, receiving the rank of Army colonel on 15 October 1783.

In 1787, he became military governor of Cuzco, in 1790 governor of the Huancavelica mines, where he remained four years, and on 28 July 1793 President of the Real Audiencia of Cusco. He occupied that government until September 1806, when he handed over command to his successor, Francisco Muñoz de San Clemente, and on 14 May 1807, he was named president of the Real Audiencia of Quito.

During his government in Quito, he was surprised by the Quito Revolution caused by Criolo elements who deposed him from his command on 10 August 1809, and established a Sovereign Junta chaired by Juan Pío Montúfar. Faced with the advance of Arredondo's Royalist troops coming from Lima, the Junta returned him to command (28 October 1809) on condition of a total amnesty, an agreement that infuriated Viceroy Abascal and wasn't respected.

The advanced age of Ruiz de Castilla (76) made him an easy prey to the intrigues of the Patriots, accepting the position of president of the Second Government Junta of Quito on 22 September 1810.

On 11 December 1811, he was deposed and imprisoned, when the Second Government Junta declared its independence from Spain.
He was stabbed to death in the Quito prison, during popular riots in June 1812.

== Links ==
- Biografias y vidas

Media related to Manuel Ruiz Urriés de Castilla at Wikimedia Commons
