= José de Cuero y Caicedo =

Bishop and politician

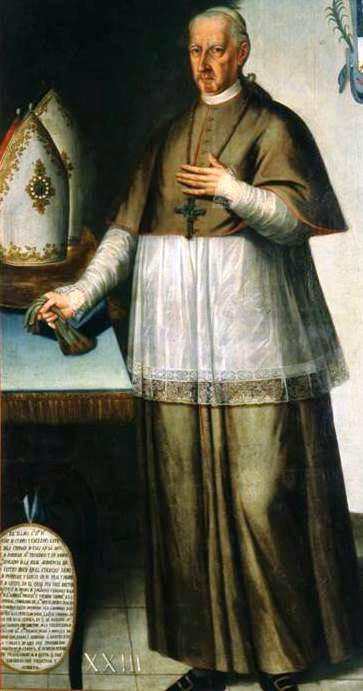

3rd President of Ecuador
- In office September 9, 1811 – December 10, 1812
- Preceded by: Juan José Guerrero y Matheu
- Succeeded by: Office abolished

Personal details
- Born: 11 September 1735 Cali, Colombia
- Died: 10 December 1815 (aged 80) Lima, Peru
- Parent(s): Fernando Cuero y Pérez and Bernabela Caicedo y Jiménez
- Occupation: Bishop and lawyer

José de Cuero y Caicedo was a bishop and politician who served as President of Ecuador, Vice President of Sovereign Board of Quito, Bishop of Roman Catholic Archdiocese of Quito, and Roman Catholic Archdiocese of Cuenca.

== Personal life ==
He was born on 11 September 1735 in Cali, Colombia to Fernando Cuero y Pérez and Bernabela Caicedo y Jiménez. He received a Doctorate of Philosophy in 1762 and title of Lawyer on 20 June 1768.

=== Political activities ===
Already as a Bishop he belonged to the famous Escuela de la Concordia Society, formed with the secret purpose of propagating progressive political ideas. Despite not having participated in the Revolution of 10 August 1809, he was named Vice President of the First Sovereign Government Board (Junta). When the Revolution was crushed by the Spanish 2 months later, he escaped the imprisonment and execution of the other conspirators.

When a new revolt under command of Carlos de Montúfar led to a Second Junta and the independent State of Quito in 1812, the Bishop became its President. Again, the Spanish army defeated the Republicans and retook Quito on 1 December 1812. The Spanish authorities ordered his exile along with that of several Quito Patriots involved in the independence movement.

He lived his last years in poverty in Lima, Peru, where he died on 10 December 1815.
On 12 September 2016, his remains were reburied in Quito with high military honors.
