= Manuela Cañizares =

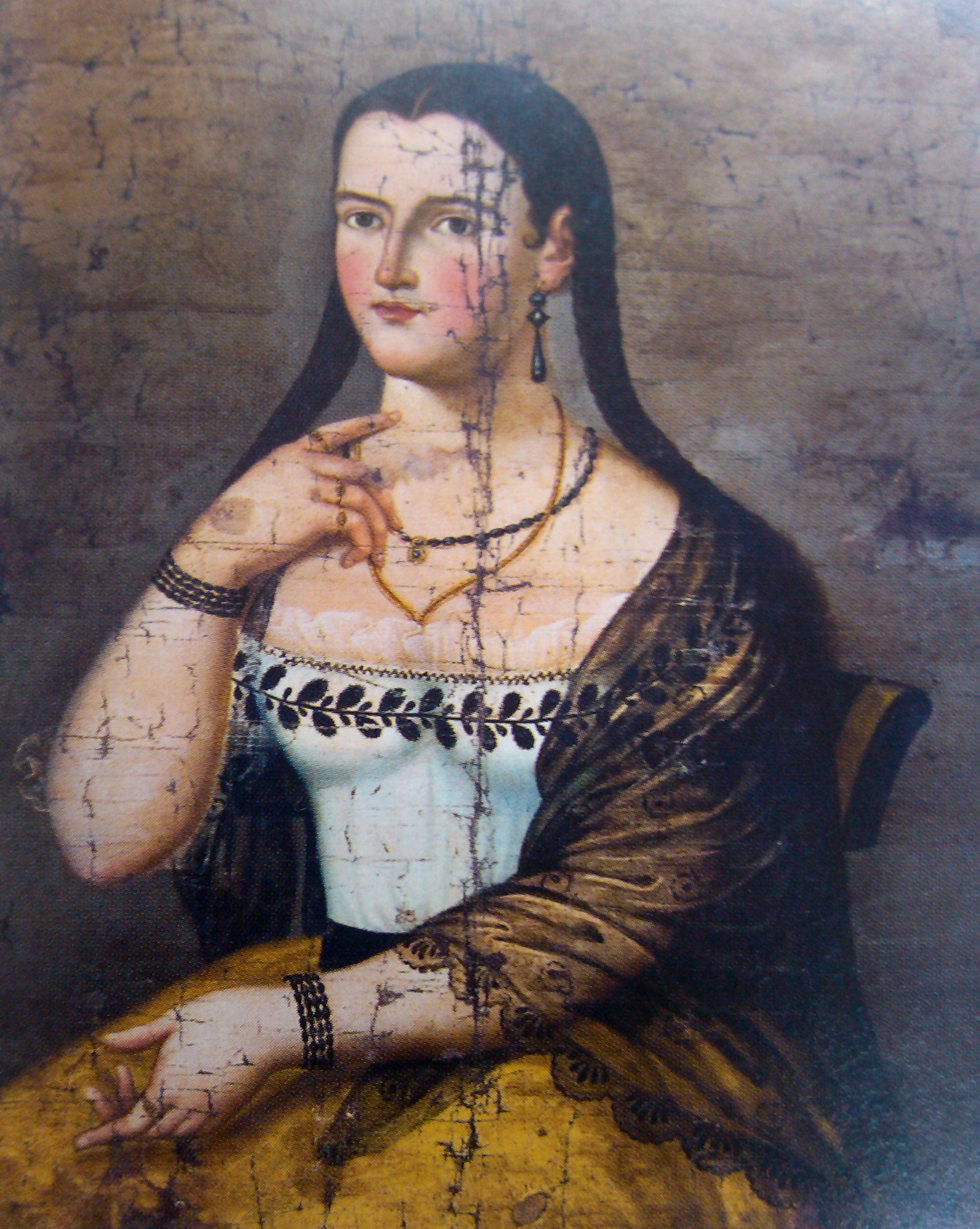
Manuela Cañizares, by Antonio Andrade (around 1799).

Manuela Cañizares (1769-1814) was an Ecuadorian salonist and who worked toward Ecuadorian independence.

== Life ==
Cañizares was the host of a popular literary salon in Quito from about 1797, which was a center of the city's intellectual life. On 9–10 August 1809, Manuela Cañizares hosted the famous meeting between the Ecuadorian rebels, which resulted in the formation of the first rebel government, Junta Autonoma de Quito, and declaration of independence in her salon. She was not only the host of the meeting, but an active participant in it, and reputedly a leading and driving force behind the revolution.

== Death ==
She was sentenced to death in absentia by the Spanish authorities and went into hiding during the war.
Little is known of the rest of her life. She made her will on 27 August 1814, and from that document it is known that her last days were spent as a victim of the consequences of an accident, that she was single and without children, that she earned her living by making lace and renting suits that were used for festivals, and that she owned the Cotocollao farm where she raised cattle.

Historians agree that she died 5 months after making her will, on 15 December 1814.

== Legacy ==
In 1901, President Eloy Alfaro named the first school for women in Ecuador "Manuela Cañizares" after her.
