= Toribio Montes =

Spanish military and colonial governor (1749–1830)

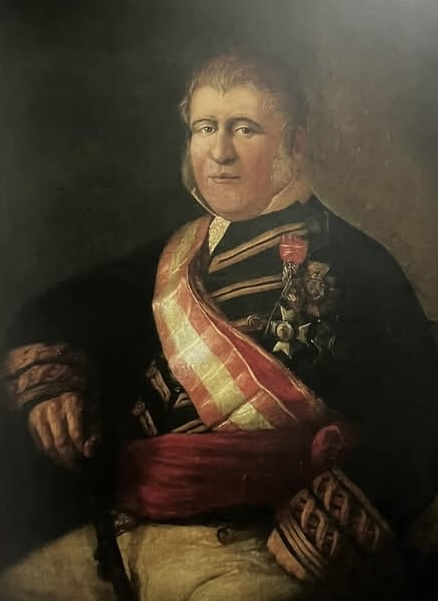
- Born: 7 May 1749 (baptised); San Mamés de Polaciones, Spain.
- Died: 31 December 1828; Murcia, Spain
- Military career
- Allegiance: Kingdom of Spain
- Branch: Spanish Army
- Rank: Lieutenant General

Governor of Puerto Rico
- In office 12 November 1804 – 3 June 1809
- Monarchs: Charles IV; Ferdinand VII
- First Secretary of State: Pedro Cevallos Guerra
- Viceroy of New Spain: José de Iturrigaray; Pedro de Garibay
- Preceded by: Ramón de Castro y Gutiérrez
- Succeeded by: Salvador Meléndez Bruna

President of the Real Audiencia of Quito
- In office 1812–1817
- Preceded by: José Cuero y Caicedo
- Succeeded by: Juan Ramírez de Orozco

Toribio Montes y Pérez (baptised 7 May 1749 – 31 December 1830) was a soldier and Spanish colonial governor. He governed Puerto Rico between 1804 and 1809 and presided over the Royal Audience of Quito from 1811 to 1817.

== Early years ==
Toribio Montes was born in the Cantabrian village of San Mamés, into a military family of rural hidalgos. His father, Pedro Montes-Caloca, was a lieutenant councilor and trustee for the entire Polaciones valley.

== Career ==
In 1766, he joined the Prince's Infantry Regiment as a captain. He spent over four years garrisoned at Oran, where he was wounded at the Invasion of Algiers of 1775. He then transferred to the America Regiment, with which he participated in the siege of Gibraltar in 1779 and in the reconquest of Menorca.

In 1792 he was promoted to lieutenant colonel and returned to the Prince's Infantry Regiment, seeing action in the War of the Pyrenees, at the Peyrestortes and Truillas.

At the beginning of 1794 he was promoted to brigadier and given command of the Murcia Regiment. The following May he was wounded and lost the use of three fingers of one hand. At the head of 3,200 troops covering the right flank of the Spanish forces, he was forced to withdraw to Rosas, where he embarked with one of his battaions to Girona. The other two had been taken prisoner by the French. On his arrival, he was appointed governor of Montjuic castle.

In 1802, after participating in the War of the Oranges, he was promoted to field marshal.

In 1804, he was appointed to occupy the Captaincy General of Puerto Rico, where he stayed for almost five years, distinguishing himself by his good government.

In November 1811, he was appointed president of the Royal Audience of Quito in the Viceroyalty of New Granada and commander-in-chief of the Spanish army in the province. At that time, Quito was in open rebellion against Spain, and had created the independent State of Quito. Montes along with Brigadier Juan de Sámano defeated the quiteño Patriots rebels at the Battle of Ibarra and restored the authority of the Crown in Quito. In 1812, Montes was promoted to lieutenant general.

After restoring Spanish control over the province Montes pivoted his efforts to the rebel threat to the north of him. The resistance of the insurgents of the Confederated Cities of Valle del Cauca (Modern day southern Colombia) in the Province of Popayán forced him to appoint Sámano as commander of the Spanish forces in the royalist stronghold of Pasto, where they were able to retake control of Popayán from the New Granadan patriot forces. However the news of the fall of Popayán into royalists hands alerted both the United Provinces of New Granada and Free and Independent State of Cundinamarca who banded together to defeat the royalist threat with Lieutenant General Antonio Nariño personally leading a military campaign to push back the Royalists in 1813. Sámano subsequently engaged Nariño in various battles but was defeated numerous times and allowed Popayán to fall into Patriot hands once again. Montes furious with Sámano replaced him and named General Melchor Aymerich as commander of the Spanish royalist forces in the province, however he too was defeated and Nariño and his army had reached the gates of Pasto by late 1814 but were subsequently defeated with his weakened army retreating back to Popayán and Nariño himself was captured by royalist forces. Montes who had previously ordered the various executions of multiple captured Quiteño and Neogranadine Patriot officers this time refrained from doing so and instead commuted Nariño's sentence ordering his transfer to prison on the Spanish peninsula.

After the defeat of Nariño's army, Montes who had received information that King Ferdinand VII was planning to send a Spanish expeditionary army to bolster the Spanish army in the americas. Montes who also received support in supplies and troops from the Viceroyalty of Peru decided to launch an offensive on the New Granadan patriots appointing Lieutenant Colonel Vidaurrázaga as commander of the army who subsequently occupied Popayán on December 29, 1814. Vidaurrázaga continued his offensive northward with aims of taking he Valle del Cauca, however the Neogranadine Army of the South under the command of General José María Cabal defeated this offensive at the Battle of the Palo River on July 5, 1815, and Popayán fell into the hands of the Neogranadine army once again on July 9. Montes understood that he required the services of Sámano, who was in Quito awaiting legal proceedings for his defeats in Alto Palacé and Calibío (1814). He called Sámano back to service and offered Camilo Torres Tenorio, in charge of the Federal Executive branch of the United Provinces of New Granada, an honorable surrender that was energetically rejected.

Around those days, the military expedition of Lieutenant General Pablo Morillo arrived from Spain, made up almost entirely of ex-combatants from the war against the French on the peninsula. Morillo surrounded and took Cartagena de Indias and occupied Cachirí, while Sámano, who had left Pasto with 1,400 men, was fortified a few leagues from Popayán. in Cuchilla del Tambo in 1816, he defeated the insurgents under the orders of Lieutenant Colonel Liborio Mejía. Among those executed after that battle was Carlos Montúfar, former royal commissioner for Quito for the Regency Council.

Montes had to undo the orders executed during the Cadiz constitutional period, after the repeal of the Cádiz Constitution, in 1817 days after finishing his term as president of the Royal Court.

He left Quito on July 26, 1817, although he did not arrive in Spain until two years later, when he arrived in Cádiz on April 29, 1819. After appearing before the Minister of War in Madrid, he was appointed member of the orders of Isabella I of Castile and San Fernando, and later a member of the Military Junta of the Indies.

At age seventy-two, after sixty-three years in the army, Montes requested to retire to the city of Murcia. A few months later, the invasion of the Hundred Thousand Sons of Saint Louis took place, as a result of which the liberal authorities fled from Murcia province. After reestablishing absolutism, Montes was placed in command of the province until he was replaced on December 31, 1827. In April 1828 he asked the king to move to Madrid, to escape the poor quality of the water in Murcia that he says was not good for his health. His health may have deteriorated because he did travel to Madrid, dying in Murcia on January 1, 1829, at age seventy-nine.
