= Free Province of Guayaquil =

Short-lived Independent State (1820–1822)

Free Province of Guayaquil Provincia Libre de Guayaquil (Spanish)
- 1820–1822
- Flag Coat of arms
- Motto: Por Guayaquil Independiente (Spanish for 'For Independent Guayaquil')
- Anthem: Song of October Ninth
- Location of the Free Province of Guayaquil in 1820.
- Capital: Guayaquil
- Official languages: Spanish
- Religion: Catholic church
- Government: Presidential system
- President
  - 1820 (first): José Joaquín de Olmedo
  - 1820: Triumvirate (Olmedo, Ximena, Roca)
  - 1821-1822: José Joaquín de Olmedo
  - 1822 (last): Simón Bolívar
- History
  - Independence of Guayaquil: 9 October 1820
  - Battle of Pichincha: 24 May 1822
  - Guayaquil Conference: 27 July 1822
  - Integration to Gran Colombia: 31 July 1822

Area
  - Total: 53.000 km^{2} (20.463 sq mi)

Population
  - Estimate: 70.000 (in 1822)
- Currency: Spanish real
Preceded by	Succeeded by
Viceroyalty of Peru	Guayaquil Department; Department of Tumbes

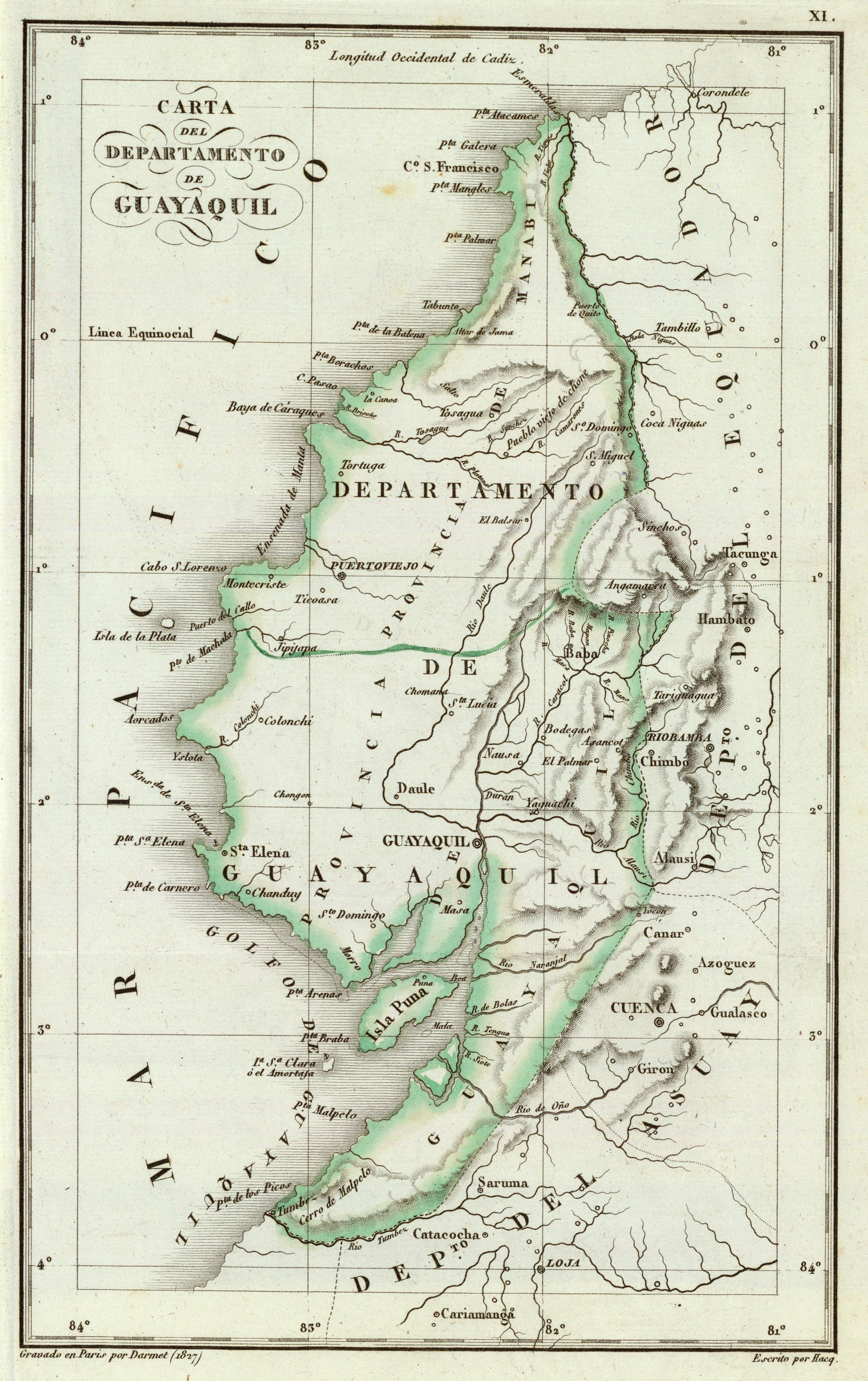
Territorial extension of the Free Province of Guayaquil subsequently integrated into the Gran Colombia.

First flag of the Free Province of Guayaquil or Republic of Guayaquil (1820–1822).

The Free Province of Guayaquil (Spanish: Provincia Libre de Guayaquil) was a South American state that emerged between 1820 and 1822 with the independence of the province of Guayaquil from the Spanish monarchy. The free province had a provisional government and constitution until its annexation by Gran Colombia in 1822. Its successor was the Department of Guayaquil forming part of Gran Colombia.
The Spanish province of Guayaquil had been separated from the Viceroyalty of Peru and in those days it only depended legally on the court of the Real Audiencia de Quito. About a decade later, the Departments of Guayaquil, Azuay, and Ecuador separated from Gran Colombia forming the current Ecuador.

The Free Province of Guayaquil included the same territories as the Government of Guayaquil in the Spanish colony, including land from Esmeraldas in the north to Tumbes to the south, and between the Pacific Ocean to the west and the foothills of the Andes mountain range to the east. It encompassed a large part of the Ecuadorian coast, the current Ecuadorian provinces of Guayas, Santa Elena, Manabí, most of the provinces of Los Ríos, El Oro, Cañar, part of the south of Esmeraldas, and Tumbes in modern Peru.

== History ==
=== Provisional Government Regulation ===
After the independence revolution in Guayaquil on October 9, 1820, several municipalities immediately joined: Samborondón on October 10, Daule on October 11, and Naranjal on October 15. Twenty-three days later, on Wednesday, November 8, convened by the Guayaquil city council, the 57 representatives of all the city councils of the new State installed the Electoral College or Congress of the Free Province of Guayaquil, an organization that dictated its electoral statute or constitution of the province called "Provisional Government Regulations," which was the first constitution that would govern the legal destinies of this State and whose first article said:

"The State of Guayaquil is free and independent; its religion is Catholic; its Government is elective; and its laws are the same as those in force lately, as long as they are not opposed to the new form of government established."

The Provisional Regulation of the State of Guayaquil governed the aforementioned territory between its independence from Spain and its annexation to Gran Colombia. It was the first constitution with the force of law and its congress was the first constituent assembly held in territory independent of the Real Audiencia de Quito. It confirmed the ambiguous and provisional condition of the new State with respect to its legal status.

Trade shall be free, by land and sea, with all peoples who do not oppose the free form of our government.

— Art. 3

Its main points contained elements of republicanism such as the division of powers and equality before the law, and of liberalism such as free trade, Manchester pacifism, voluntary military service (except in case of war), and the right to choose future political status; the establishment of the Catholic religion is the official religion the only conservative aspect that is found in the political letter.

At the time referred to universal suffrage was not yet established, so there was no democratic representation by general election and the process of election and control of the congress was through the self-appointed "Junta de gobierno" system (see Juntismo and Oligarchy). In a similar way to the process of independence of the other American colonies, those who were left in charge of public functions and the political power of the provisional State, through the Electoral College, were men belonging to the Criollo elites, that is, high officials and high-society characters from this region of the colony who made up a Junta de Notables.

The Fundamental Charter of the State handed over power to a triumvirate made up of José Joaquín de Olmedo, Rafael Ximena and Francisco María Roca. Messengers were immediately sent to Simón Bolívar and José de San Martín, as well as to the cities of the Sierra.

In the nascent republic (subsequent Republic of Ecuador) laws were approved in favor of slaves, such as that the children of slaves were free.

=== Military geopolitics of independence and Protective Division of Quito ===
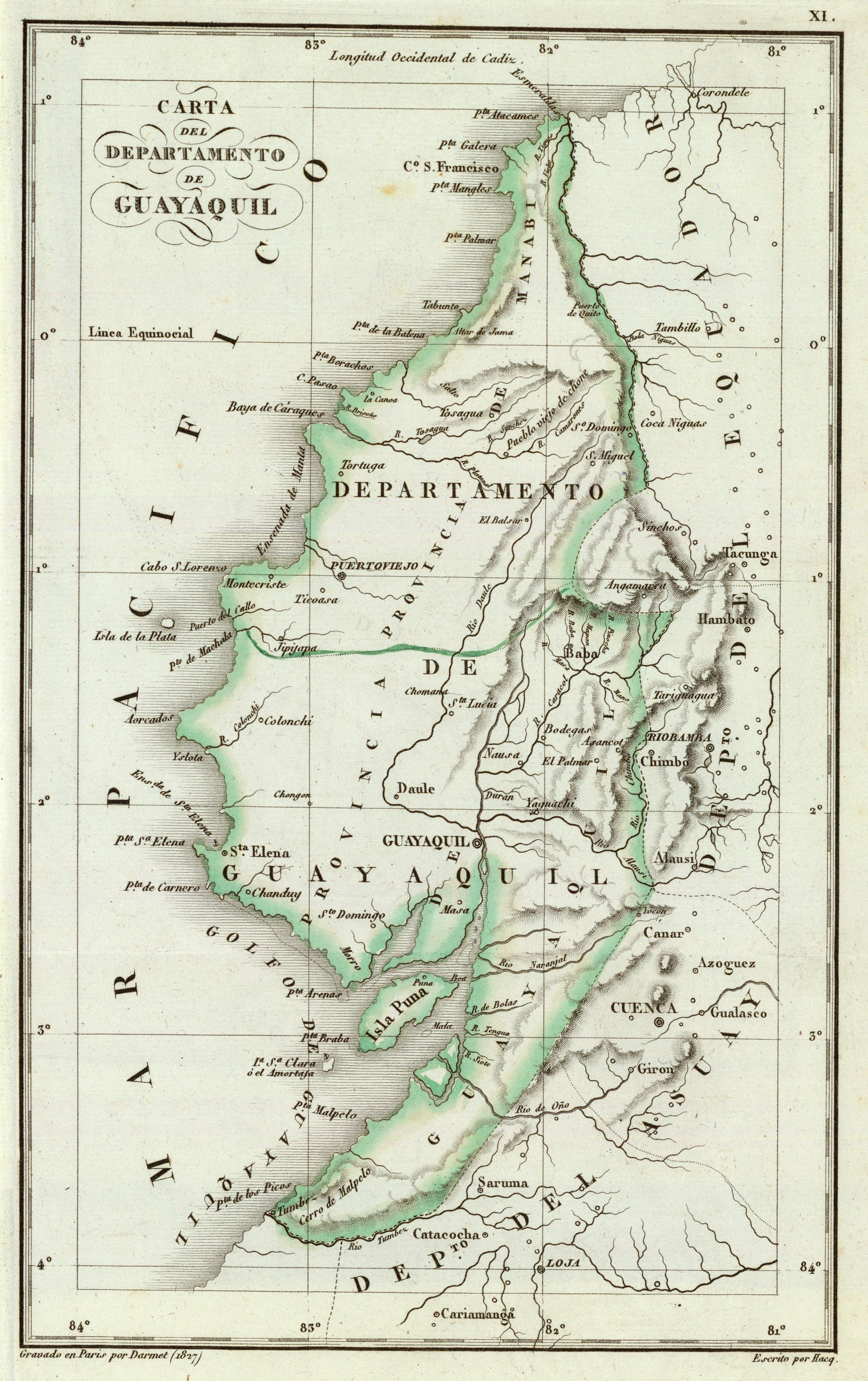
Territorial extension of the Free Province of Guayaquil later integrated into Gran Colombia.

Second flag of the Free Province of Guayaquil or the Republic of Guayaquil, which included several provinces of the current Ecuadorian coast and whose capital was the city of Guayaquil.

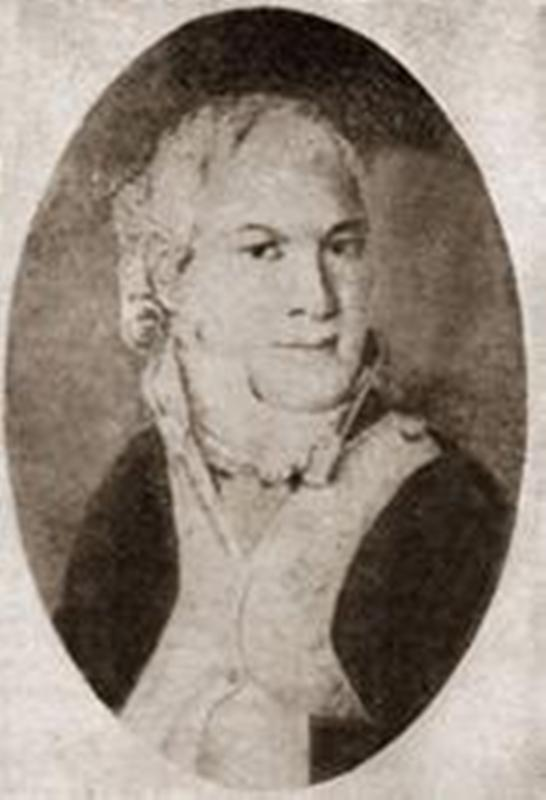
Portrait of Colonel Jacinto de Bejarano y Lavayen, a precursor of the independence of the Free Province of Guayaquil (which currently forms an integral part of the territory of the Republic of Ecuador).

The Guayaquil revolutionaries were convinced that their first objective should be the liberation of the Quito mountain range and they advanced, defeating the royalists, on November 9, in the Battle of Camino Real near Guaranda. According to some historical studies, it can be deduced that the rulers of the already sovereign province of Guayaquil probably aspired to create an independent Republic in the territories of the Real Audiencia of Quito, to which the Province belonged, under the name of "Republic of Quito" and they aspired that their capital would be Santiago de Guayaquil. However, there is no unanimous opinion among historians.

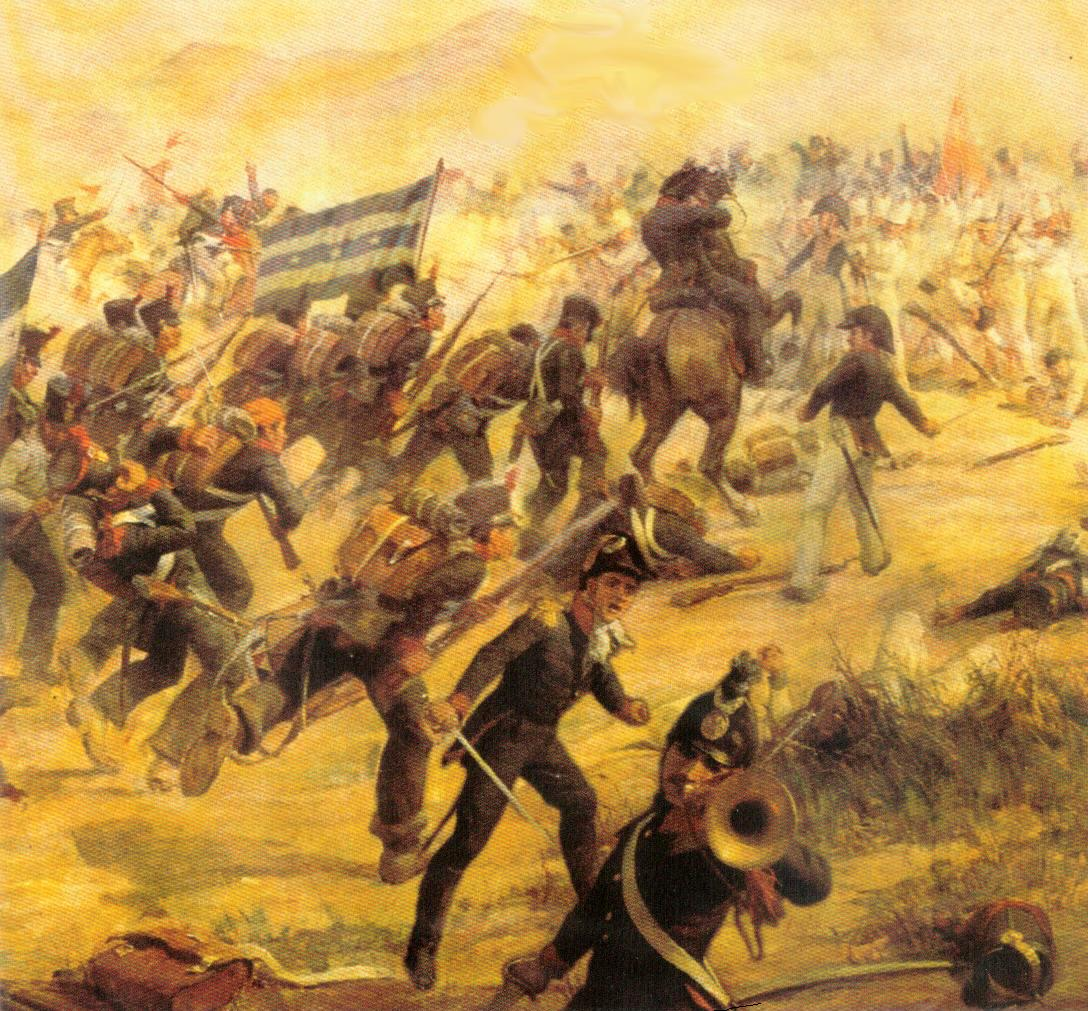
Battle of Camino Real. After its independence, the government of the Guayaquil province formed an army of 1,500 men to liberate the rest of the Real Audiencia, it was called the Protective Division of Quito.

The State of Guayaquil, for continental statesmen and American military strategists of the time, had no place in the post-independence political order. This was probably also foreseen by the members of the Junta, who had told both Simón Bolívar and José de San Martín that the Province would be added to any of the States that were to be organized after the chaos of the independence campaigns. What they asked was that they be allowed to choose.

In any case, without the independence of the territories of the Real Audiencia, the very independence of the nascent state of Guayaquil could not be certain. This was stated by the Venezuelan officer León de Febres-Cordero (who participated in the independence), quoted by José de Villamil:

[...] The success of both generals (Bolívar and San Martín) may depend on the revolution of this important province because of the moral effect it produced even if it produced nothing else. The Chilean army will know that it is not coming to an enemy country and that in case of conflict it has a lee post that can become a "Gibraltar". General Bolívar will send us soldiers accustomed to winning, and from here we will open the gates of Pasto, which will be very difficult for him to open by attacking from the north.

General Antonio José de Sucre arrived in Guayaquil with a Colombian support force of 700 armed and equipped men in August 1821 and fought alongside the people of Guayaquil against the Spanish who were still endangering the independence of the province Yaguachi (current province of Guayas). The Guayaquil-Colombian coalition commanded by Sucre triumphed in the Battle of Yaguachi, definitively ensuring the independence of the Free Province of Guayaquil. After the victory, Sucre asked the people of Guayaquil for help to complete the emancipation of the other departments that made up the Real Audiencia and bring independence to Cuenca and Quito, a process that Olmedo supported from start to finish.

For this purpose, the Guayaquil government established the Protective Division of Quito with 1,500 men. Together with the Colombian armies, they attacked the royalist troops established in the Audiencia and completed total emancipation on May 24, 1822, in the Battle of Pichincha, where the flag of Guayaquil was waved next to the banners of the Gran Colombian state.

=== The Battle of Pichincha ===
Guayaquil contributed to the absolute liberation of Quito (now Ecuador). Simón Bolívar and his forces, who often receive credit for the victory, were not present during the battle. An excerpt from the Patriota de Guayaquil, the first Guayaquil newspaper and the main spokesperson for the Government of the Free Province, shows that the battle waged on the slopes of the Pichincha volcano, was not only the glory of Colombia and Peru, but that Guayaquil also deserves the credit for that victory that consolidated the total independence of Ecuador:

The Patriot of Guayaquil. of Saturday June 15, 1822. The Superior Board of Government.

TAKE CARE OF US. The united forces of Peru, Colombia and Guayaquil have finally broken the heavy chains that our brothers were dragging in the second capital of the Incas: and although the tyrants had entrenched them in the enormous mountains and deep ravines of that country, they have been undone in the presence of the sons of Liberty.

The waters of the Plata, Magdalena, Rímac, and Guayaquil met to form a torrent, which, climbing the Pichincha, drowned tyranny in its lap. Those waters have made the tree of Liberty flourish, watering the beautiful Quito on May 25, and confirmed that the AURORA OF OCTOBER 9, which scratched on our horizon. It was the dawn of the brilliant day on which Liberty, with a majestic air, was to walk on the proud summit of the Andes.

GUAYAQUILEÑOS. When we set out to be free, we could not let the people around us groan in oppression: the undertaking was great, and the tyrants looked with disdain on our noble courage... They believed that your blood, which flowed three times in Guachi and Tanisagua, it would weaken and extinguish the flame of your patriotic love: but it became more alive; and while your sons, brothers and friends ran to arms, we doubled our efforts, and all our resources were used to lead the sons of immortal Colombia to our aid...

GUAYAQUILEÑOS. Quito is now free: your vows are fulfilled; Providence leads you by the hand to the Temple of Peace. to reap the fruits of your perseverance and your sacrifices... we will fill the page that touches us in the splendors of American history, and we will fulfill the great destinies to which we are called...

FELLOW CITIZENS AND FRIENDS. In your happiness alone is the prize for the hardships we have suffered for the COUNTRY... Under the auspices of Liberty, and with the protection of the great States that surround us, an immense race is opened for the prosperity of this beautiful and rich People, who will be called by all the nations of the earth, THE STAR OF THE WEST. Guayaquil June 9, 1822-3- OLMEDO-XIMENA-ROCA

=== Bolívar's coup d'état and forced annexation to Gran Colombia ===
Prior to the interview in Guayaquil, and officially on the occasion of it, on July 11, 1822, Bolívar arrived in the capital city of the Free State (Santiago de Guayaquil) and was received by the Guayaquil population with cheers of "Viva Colombia," "Long live Bolívar" and "Long live Peru," expressing independence solidarity with the American peoples. Some historians see in these public expressions an annexationist desire toward Colombia or Peru and other states that the Guayaquil government intended to remain sovereign.

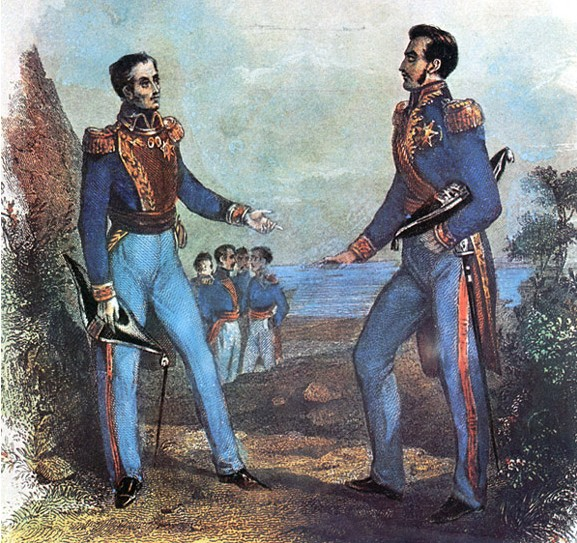
Simón Bolívar and José de San Martín in the meeting later named "Guayaquil Conference".

Bolívar considered Guayaquil a point of entry for Peru, the last region without independence in South America and the largest royalist bastion, for which he considered the annexation of the Province to the Republic of Colombia strategic; previously, the Quito council had already declared its annexation to Colombia. General Bolívar, backed by a strong military contingent, staged a coup d'état, proclaiming himself Supreme Chief of the Province, and decreed the annexation to Gran Colombia, ignoring the government presided over by José Joaquín de Olmedo. The annexation of Guayaquil to Gran Colombia caused the self-exile of Olmedo, who in a letter informed Simón Bolívar of his disagreement with the measures adopted by his government.

A few days later, Simón Bolívar received José de San Martín, in his capacity as head of the government of the province. According to historical documents, in the interview in Guayaquil, the two discussed, among other issues, the way to end the emancipatory war in Peru and the form of government for the American states. While San Martín leaned towards a monarchical regime, with constitutional characteristics, Bolívar was in favor of a democratic republic. The meeting did not include the fate of the Guayaquil province among its points, as is often wrongly stated.

On July 31, 1822, the Free Province of Guayaquil declared its official annexation to Gran Colombia. For this reason, Guayaquil became the District of the South of the Colombian state together with the Department of Ecuador with capital in Quito, and the Department of Azuay with capital in Cuenca, under the name of Department of Guayaquil with capital in the City of Guayaquil.

=== General Pedro Gual's plan on how to proceed with Guayaquil if it was not annexed to Gran Colombia ===
Faced with the refusal of the Guayaquil government to be annexed to Bolivarian Colombia, the Venezuelan Pedro Gual sent a letter to Bolívar—which did not reach him until after the annexation in July 1822—detailing a plan to put pressure on the city government and take over the region of what is now Manabí, whose annexation to the northern country he saw as the best outcome. The plan that the Venezuelan elaborated on was the following:

That for the resolution of the question of Guayaquil, the means of friendly negotiation is always preferred, handled with all the prudence that characterizes V.E.

That if this does not produce any effect, the canton of the Province of Porto-Viejo and all the towns of the Province of Guayaquil that recognize or are willing to spontaneously recognize the Republic of Colombia be immediately occupied by force.

That on the borders of the territory of Guayaquil that remains separated from Colombia, a Customs Office like those of our seaports be immediately established, in which the merchandise and fruits that are introduced from Guayaquil to our Provinces or are extracted from them, pay the same rights. of introduction and extraction than foreign trade in permitted articles and that are not contraband.

That if, by virtue of the above measures, the Government of Guayaquil commits the least act of hostility or violence, the Colombian troops occupy the entire province without delay, remaining from the moment attached to the Republic.

== See also ==
- Flag of Guayaquil
- Coat of arms of Guayaquil
- Canción al Nueve de Octubre
- List of former sovereign states
