= Embassy of Peru, Brasília =

Peruvian diplomatic mission in Brazil

Embassy of Peru in Brazil
- Location: Brasília, Brazil
- Jurisdiction: Brazil; Suriname
- Website: Official website

The Embassy of Peru in Brazil (Portuguese: Embaixada do Peru em Brasília, Spanish: Embajada del Perú en Brasil) is the diplomatic representation of Peru in Brazil. The current Peruvian ambassador to Brazil is Rómulo Fernando Acurio Traverso.

== History ==
Both countries established diplomatic relations in 1826. Before the construction of Brasília, Peru had an embassy in Rio de Janeiro.

Like other countries, Peru received free land in the Setor de Embaixadas Sul at the time of construction of Brasília, a measure aimed at speeding up the installation of foreign representations in the new capital.

The embassy complex, like most embassies of the Americas, is brutalist in architecture. It has a curious volumetry, based on the structure formed by pilasters and inclined blades of reinforced concrete. Its project was designed by the architects Jacques Crousse and Jorge Paez and the works took place between 1973 and 1974.

== Mission and organization ==
The embassy performs the protocol services of foreign representations, such as assistance to Peruvians who live in Brazil and visitors from Peru and also to Brazilians who wish to visit or move to the neighboring country. Brazil has its second longest land border with Peru, with almost three thousand kilometers, and about 3500 Brazilians live in Peru, which has also become a significant tourist destination for Brazilians. Other actions that pass through the embassy are diplomatic relations with the Brazilian government in the political, economic, cultural and scientific areas. Trade between the countries reached US$ 3.97 billion in 2018, and diplomacy also deals with border issues, such as the fight against drug trafficking. Brazil maintains its most extensive technical cooperation program with a South American country such as Peru. The embassy also carries out cultural activities to promote Peru.

In addition to the embassy, Peru has four other general consulates in Rio de Janeiro, São Paulo, Manaus and Rio Branco, in addition to five honorary consulates in Porto Alegre, Curitiba, Fortaleza, Belo Horizonte and Salvador.

== See also ==
- Embassy of Brazil, Lima
- Brazil–Peru relations
