= Brazil–Peru relations =

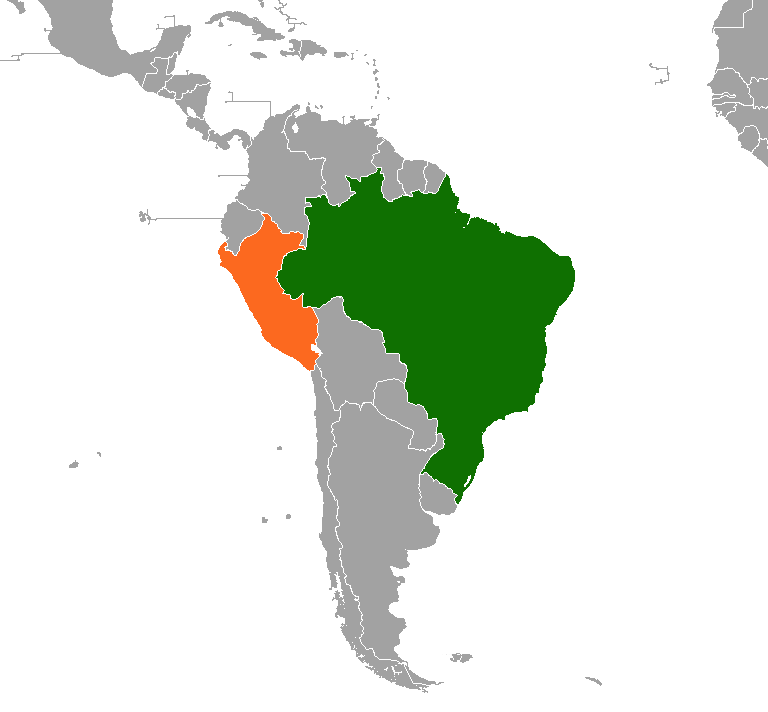
- Brazil: Peru

Diplomatic mission
- Embassy of Brazil, Lima: Embassy of Peru, Brasília

Brazil–Peru relations are the bilateral and historical relations between the Federative Republic of Brazil and the Republic of Peru. Both countries were members of the Portuguese and Spanish empires, respectively, and are members of the Latin American Integration Association, Organization of American States and United Nations.

Both countries established relations in 1826. Brazil shares its second longest border with Peru (2,995 km), only behind Bolivia. Brazil represented 1.5% of international emigration of Peruvians in 2013. Likewise, Brazilians represented 4.7% of immigrants in Peru between 1994 and 2012.

== History ==
Diplomatic relations were established in 1826, under the Peruvian government of Simón Bolívar, with the sending of José Domingos Cáceres as the first chargé d'affaires to Rio de Janeiro. In 1829, Duarte da Ponte Ribeiro was designated as the first chargé d'affaires of the Empire of Brazil and sent to Lima. In 1841, the first two bilateral treaties were negotiated in the Peruvian capital by Duarte da Ponte Ribeiro: peace, friendship, trade and navigation and limits and extradition. The treaties were not ratified by the Empire. In 1867, Brazil broke off diplomatic relations with Peru, due to Peruvian support for Paraguay, in the War of the Triple Alliance. In 1869, diplomatic relations were restored.

In 1998, Itamaraty Palace served as the location of the signing of the Brasilia Presidential Act, which settled the Ecuadorian–Peruvian territorial dispute.

Through an agreement signed in 2009, the Vice-Ministerial Commission for Brazil-Peru Border Integration (CVIF) was created.

== High-level visits ==
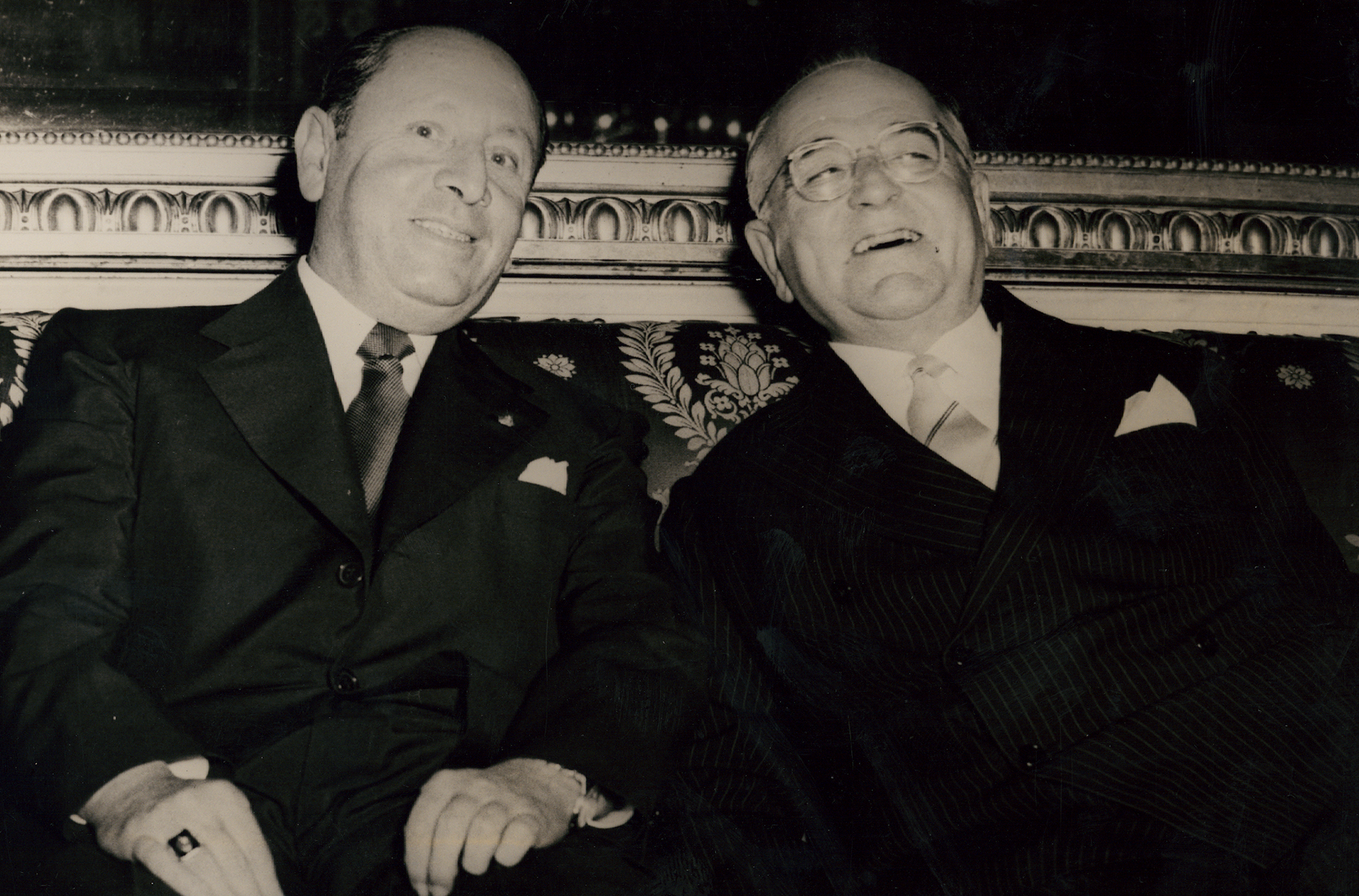
Presidents Manuel Odria and Getúlio Vargas in 1953.

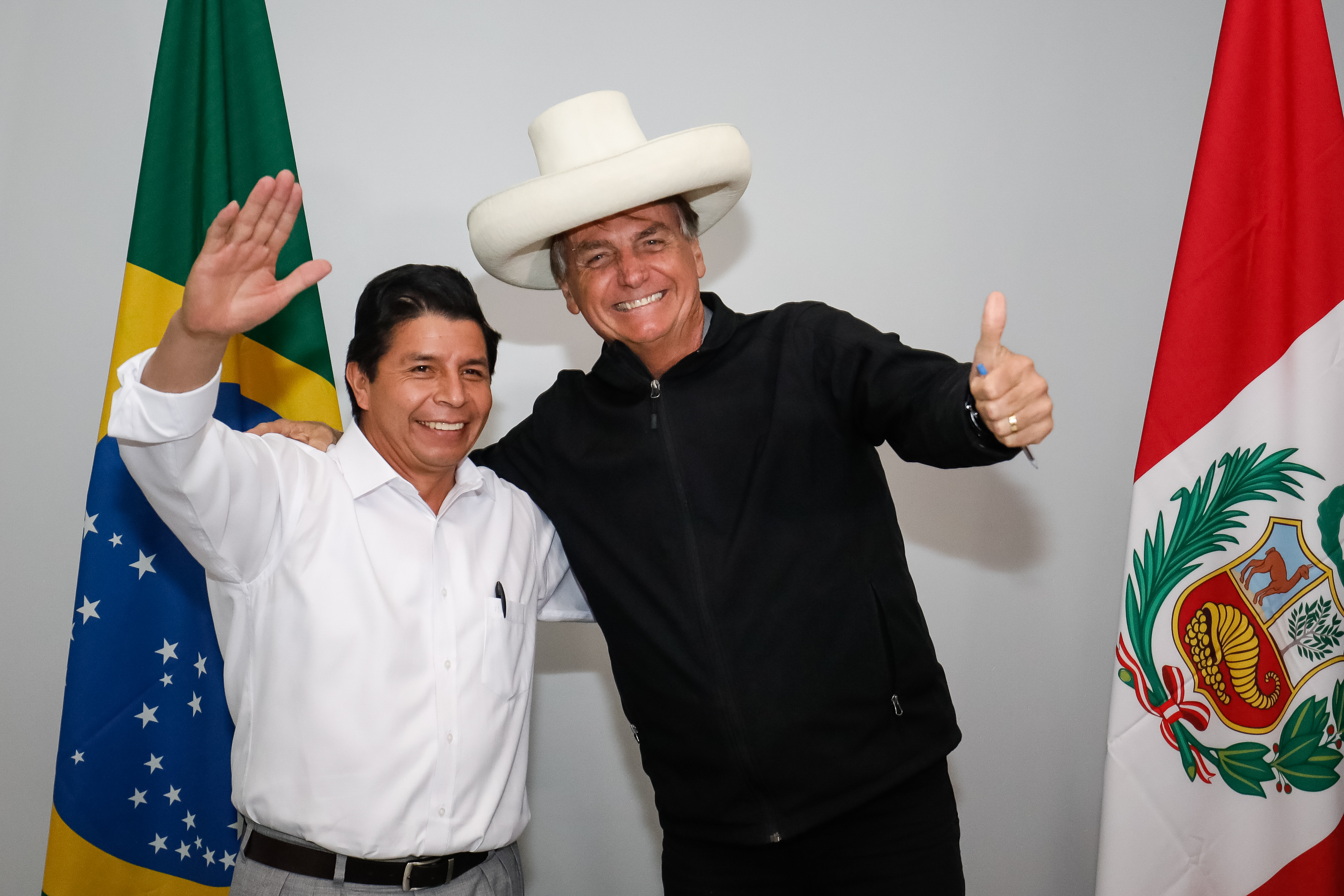
Presidents Pedro Castillo and Jair Bolsonaro in 2022.

High-level visits from Brazil to Peru

- Vice President Hamilton Mourão (2019)
- Foreign Minister Otávio Brandelli (2019)
- President Michel Temer (2018)
- Foreign Minister Marcos Galvão (2017)
- Foreign Minister Mauro Vieira (2016)
- Minister (DIC) Armando Monteiro Neto (2016)
- President Dilma Rousseff (2013)
- Minister Antonio Patriota (2016)
- President Dilma Rousseff (2011)
- President Luiz Inácio Lula da Silva (2010)
- President Luiz Inácio Lula da Silva (2003)
- President João Figueiredo (1981)

High-level visits from Peru to Brazil

- President Pedro Castillo (2022)
- Chancellor Eda Rivas (2013)
- Foreign Minister Rafael Roncagliolo (2012)
- Chancellor Rafael Roncagliolo (2011)
- President Alan García (2010)
- President Manuel Odria (1953)

== Diplomatic resident missions ==
Of Brazil

- Lima (Embassy)
- Iquitos (Vice-Consulate)

Of Peru

- Brasília (Embassy)
- Manaus (Consulate-General)
- Rio de Janeiro (Consulate-General)
- São Paulo (Consulate-General)

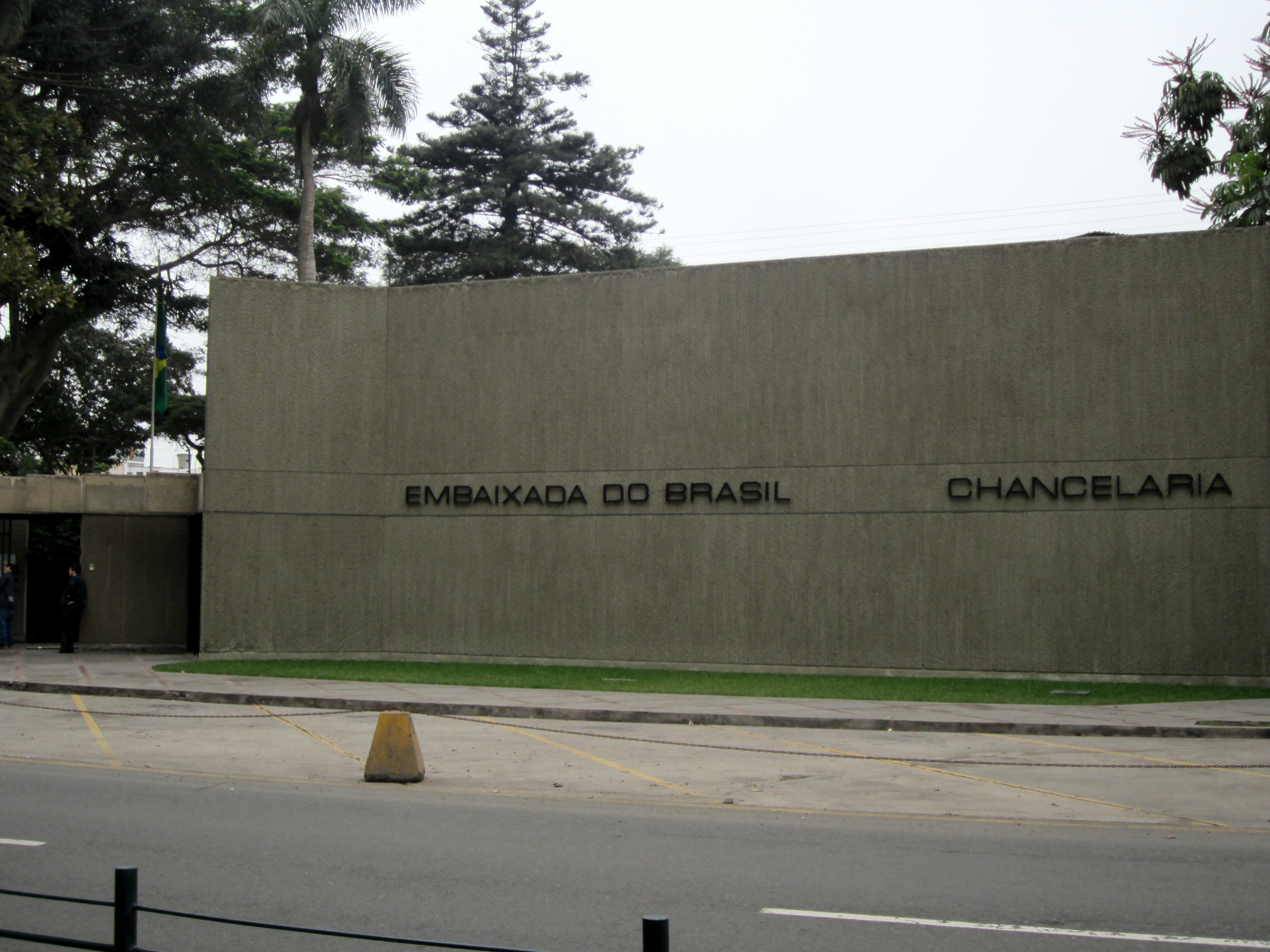
Embassy of Brazil in Lima

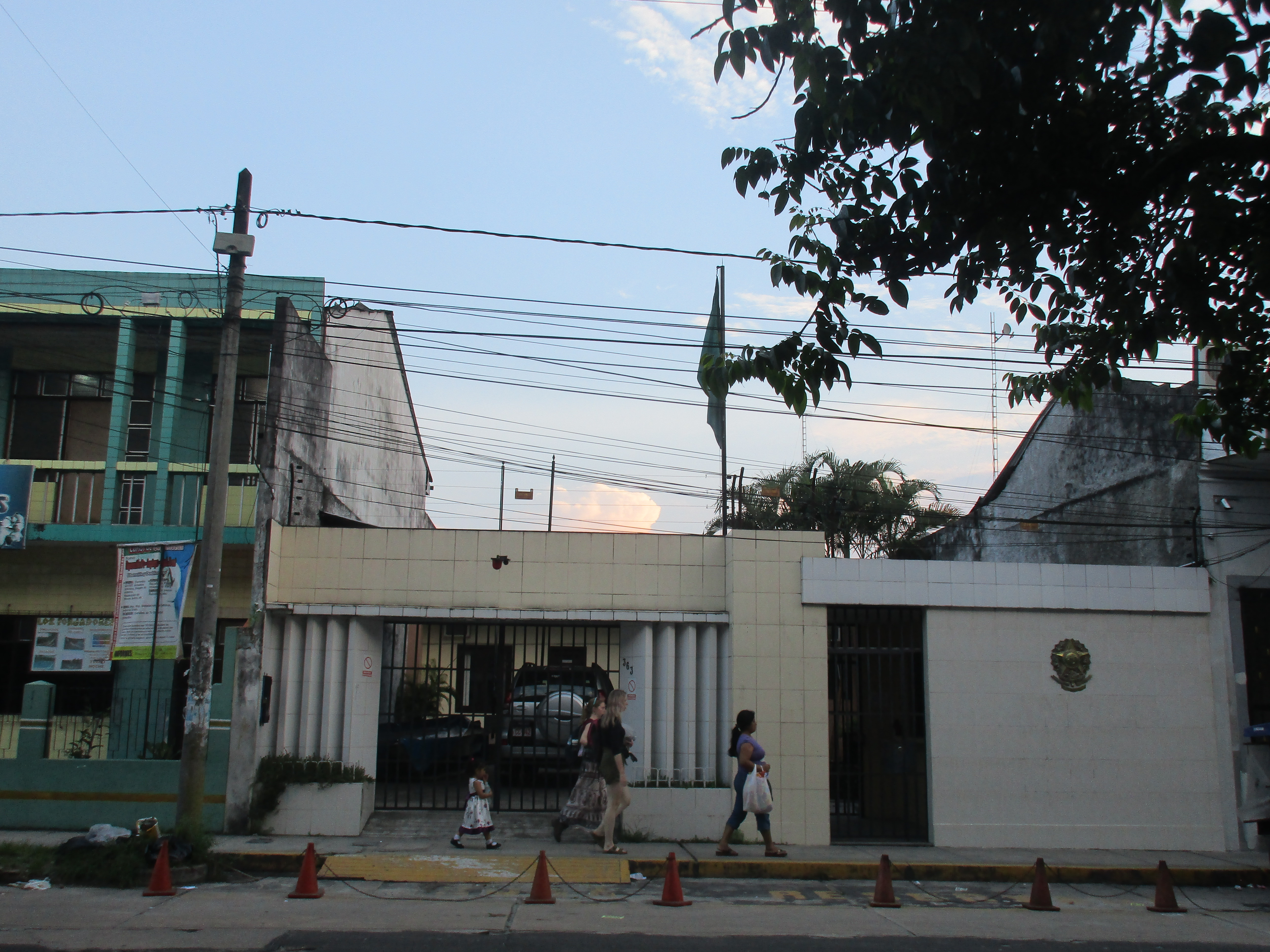
Vice-Consulate of Brazil in Iquitos

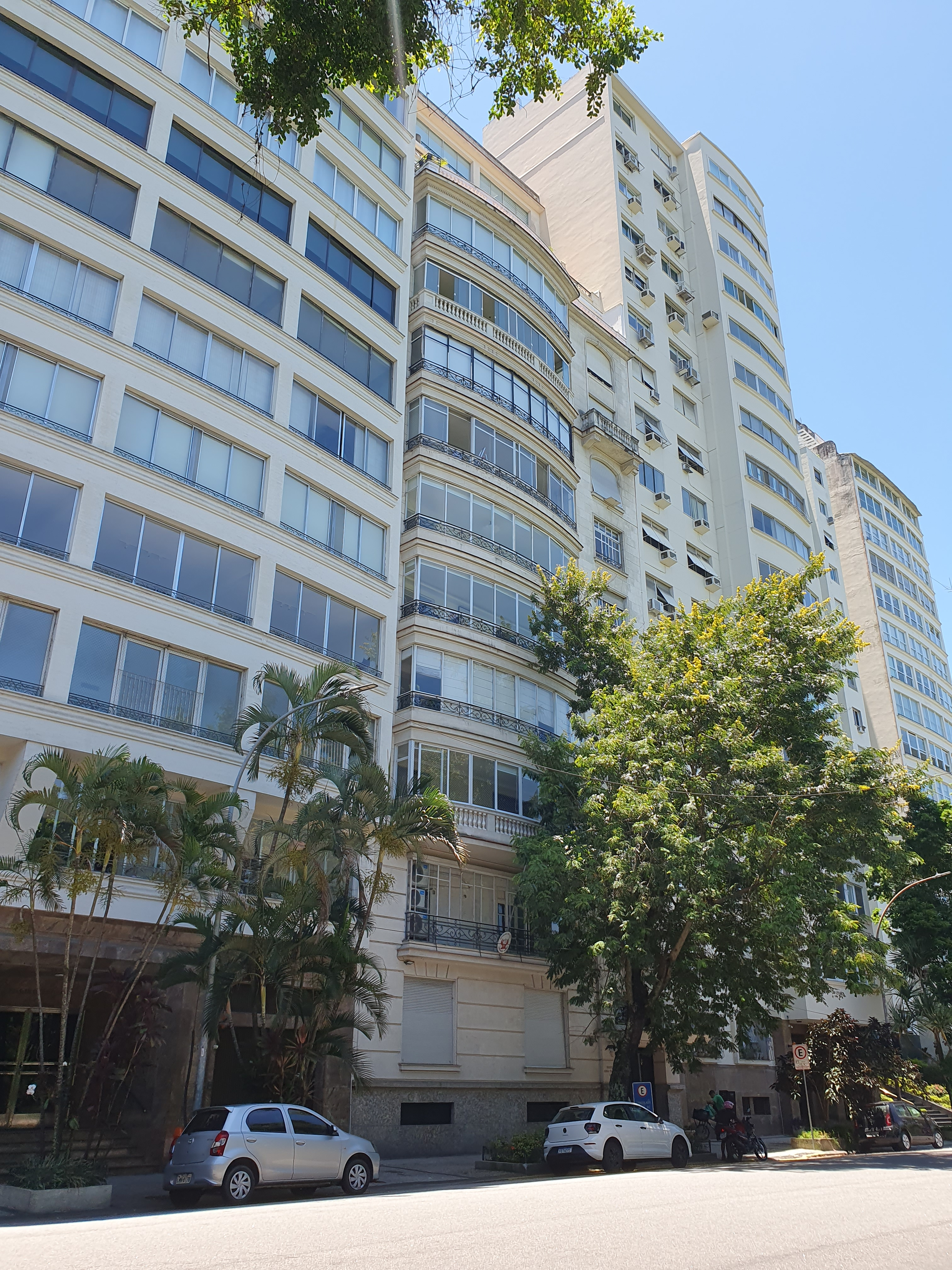
Building hosting the Consulate-General of Peru in Rio de Janeiro

== See also ==
- Foreign relations of Brazil
- Foreign relations of Peru
- List of ambassadors of Brazil to Peru
- List of ambassadors of Peru to Brazil
