= Assassination of Antonio José de Sucre =

- Part of The dissolution of Gran Colombia
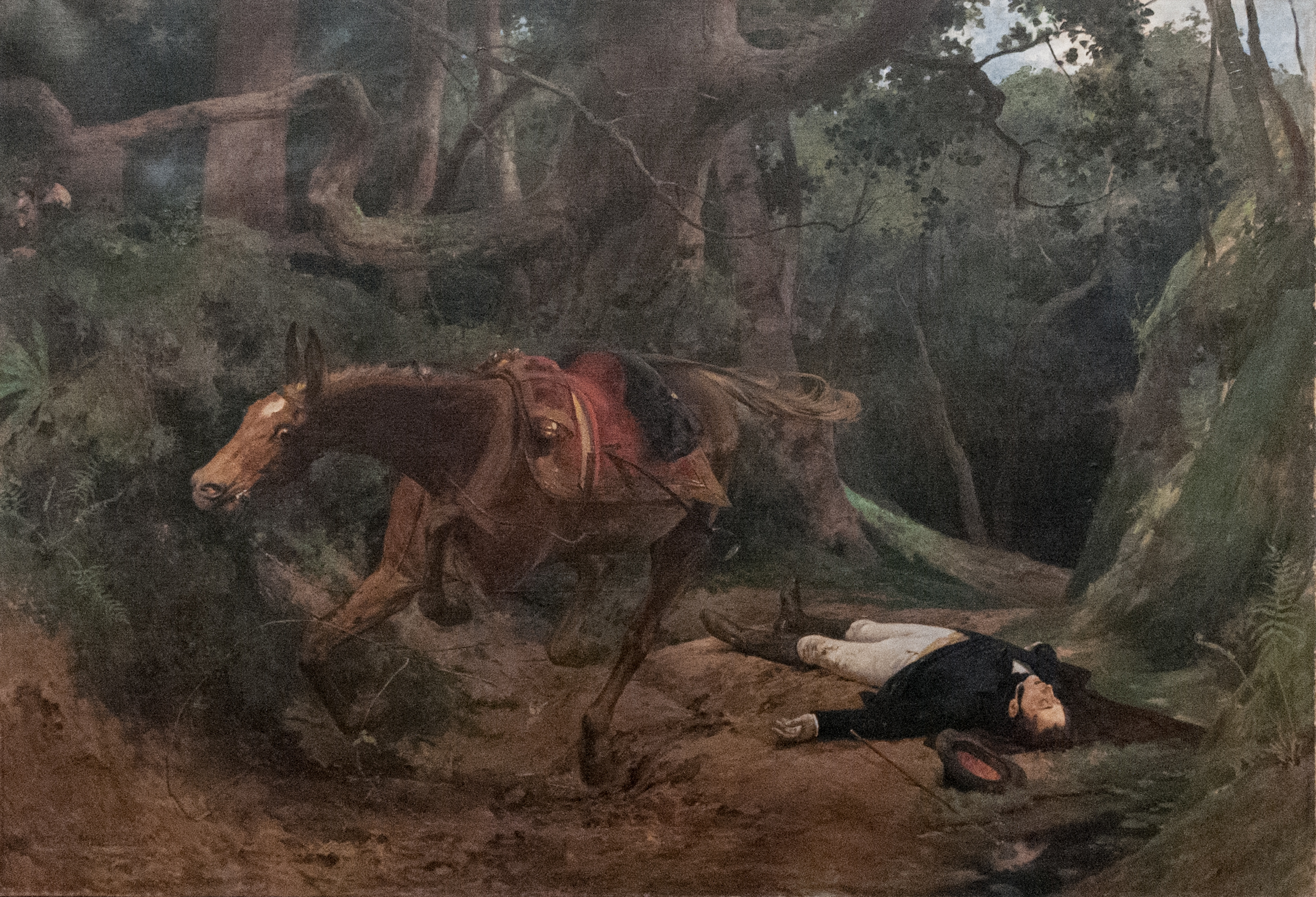
- Assassination of Sucre, painted by Arturo Michelena in 1895
- Date: 1830

In 1830, Venezuelan marshal Antonio José de Sucre was assassinated in Colombia by Colonel Apolinar Morillo and other killers, under a plan orchestrated by future President José María Obando. It was a major blow to the Bolivarian faction and a key event in the dissolution of Gran Colombia.

== History ==
In 1830, on the eve of the dissolution of Gran Colombia, Sucre was elected the last president of the country's Admirable Congress and was a key figure for the stability of the nation.

Obando received Manuel Guerrero, an emissary of Juan José Flores, and they held a secret meeting. After that, he planned the assassination together with José Hilario López and Commander Mariano Antonio Álvarez. They entrusted the operation to Apolinar Morillo, who was to meet José Erazo and Colonel Juan Gregorio Sarria, criminals in Obando's service, at a place where Erazo had a house, and from there they hired the other implicated individuals: Juan Cuzco and the soldiers Andrés Rodríguez and Juan Gregorio Rodríguez.

As Sucre was returning from Bogotá, on his way to meet his family in Quito, he was ambushed and shot three times by several assassins, among them Apolinar Morillo, in the Berruecos mountains in southern Colombia, territory dominated by José María Obando and Juan José Flores. Both blamed each other for Sucre's murder.

== Aftermath ==
Sucre's death was a major blow to Simón Bolívar, who regarded him as his successor and died that same year. It also quelled the Bolivarian reaction led by Rafael Urdaneta and was a fundamental event in the dissolution of Gran Colombia.

Rafael Urdaneta, then president of Colombia, ordered the initiation of a trial against Obando and López, but when he left office in 1831, Obando became president and the investigations were halted, while the evidence was lost.

In 1839, the trial was resumed, with Erazo in prison. Morillo was interrogated and confessed to the facts, implicating those involved and declaring that he had acted on Obando's orders.

On August 18, 1842, a Council of War sentenced Morillo to capital punishment and recommended that the president of New Granada, Pedro Alcántara Herrán, request the extradition of Obando and several of his accomplices, who were refugees in Peru. The Supreme Military Court proposed to Alcántara the commutation of Morillo's sentence, but President Alcántara disagreed. On November 30 of that year, Morillo was executed by firing squad in the main square of Bogotá. Other assassins of Sucre died by poisoning.
