= Peru–Portugal relations =

- Peru: Portugal

Diplomatic mission
- Embassy of Peru, Lisbon: Embassy of Portugal, Lima

Peru–Portugal relations (Portuguese: Relações Peru e Portugal; Spanish: Relaciones Perú y Portugal) are the bilateral relations between the Republic of Peru and the Portuguese Republic. Both nations are members of the Organization of Ibero-American States and the United Nations. Relations are described as amicable.

The countries have maintained direct diplomatic relations since 1853. After more intensive contacts in the 16th and 17th centuries, bilateral relations only intensified again in the last few decades and are now regarded as problem-free and increasingly friendly.

The most important bilateral points of contact are the joint work in the Ibero-American Summit and the Latin Union, and Portuguese support for Peruvian concerns, such as joining the OECD or negotiating an extension of the Schengen Agreement for Peruvian citizens. In addition, Peru has had observer status in the Community of Portuguese Language Countries (CPLP) since 2021.

== History ==
Despite the Portuguese-Spanish Treaty of Tordesillas in 1494, a large number of Portuguese traders, craftsmen, mercenaries and artists also tried their luck in the areas of South America that had been ceded to Spain, including Peru, which was known for its incredible silver wealth. Some names in Peru go back to the Portuguese presence, such as La Portuguesa, a mine on a tributary of the Santa River, the silver vein called "Portugués" in the province of Cajamarca, or the ore line called "Portuguesa" in Chuschi.

The Portuguese Aleixo Garcia was the first European to reach the Inca Empire in the 1520s, albeit in the service of the Spanish crown.

In 1620, the book Descrición General del Piru, em Particular de Lima was published anonymously by the Portuguese author Pedro Leão Portocarro. Written in Spanish but interspersed with numerous Portuguese mannerisms, the work contains extensive geographical, economic and social descriptions. It is thus an important source about Peru in the 17th century.

In the second half of the 16th century, a large number of Portuguese came to Peru. In Pillpinto, a village on the Apurímac River near Cuzco, the story is still circulating among the residents that in the Viceroyalty, the village was inhabited by blond Portuguese traders with green eyes for many years. In Peru's capital Lima, the main shopping street known as the Calle de los Mercaderes was dominated by Portuguese traders until they disappeared after the Grande Cumplicidade in 1659.

Peru, which became independent from Spain in 1821, and the Kingdom of Portugal, which had lost its largest colony with Peru's neighbour Brazil in 1822, entered into diplomatic relations in 1853 with a trade and shipping agreement (Spanish: Tratado de comercio y navegación). Bilateral relations have intensified only slowly since then. In 1945, Portugal opened its own permanent embassy in Lima. Peru and Portugal have been working together since 1991 within the framework of the Ibero-American Summit.

== High-level visits ==
High-level visits from Portugal to Peru

- Foreign Minister João Gomes Cravinho (2022)

== Trade ==
In 2019, Portugal was in 48th place in the ranking of destination markets for Peruvian exports. In 2018, shipments of Peruvian products to Portugal reached US$ 46 million, reporting a growth of almost 70% compared to 2017, when national exports totaled 27 million.

== Resident diplomatic missions ==
- Peru has an embassy in Lisbon.
- Portugal has an embassy in Lima.
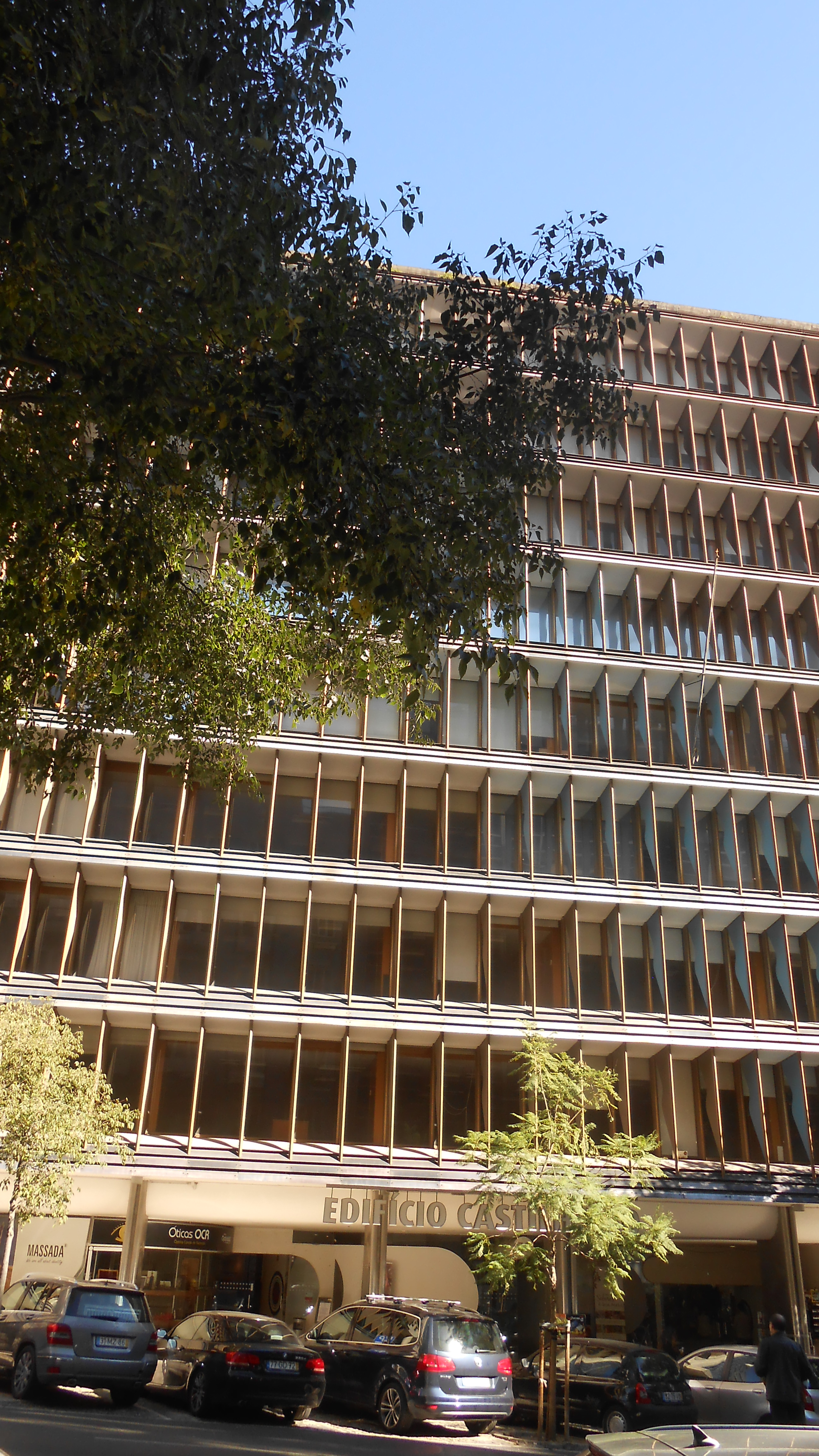
Peruvian embassy in Lisbon

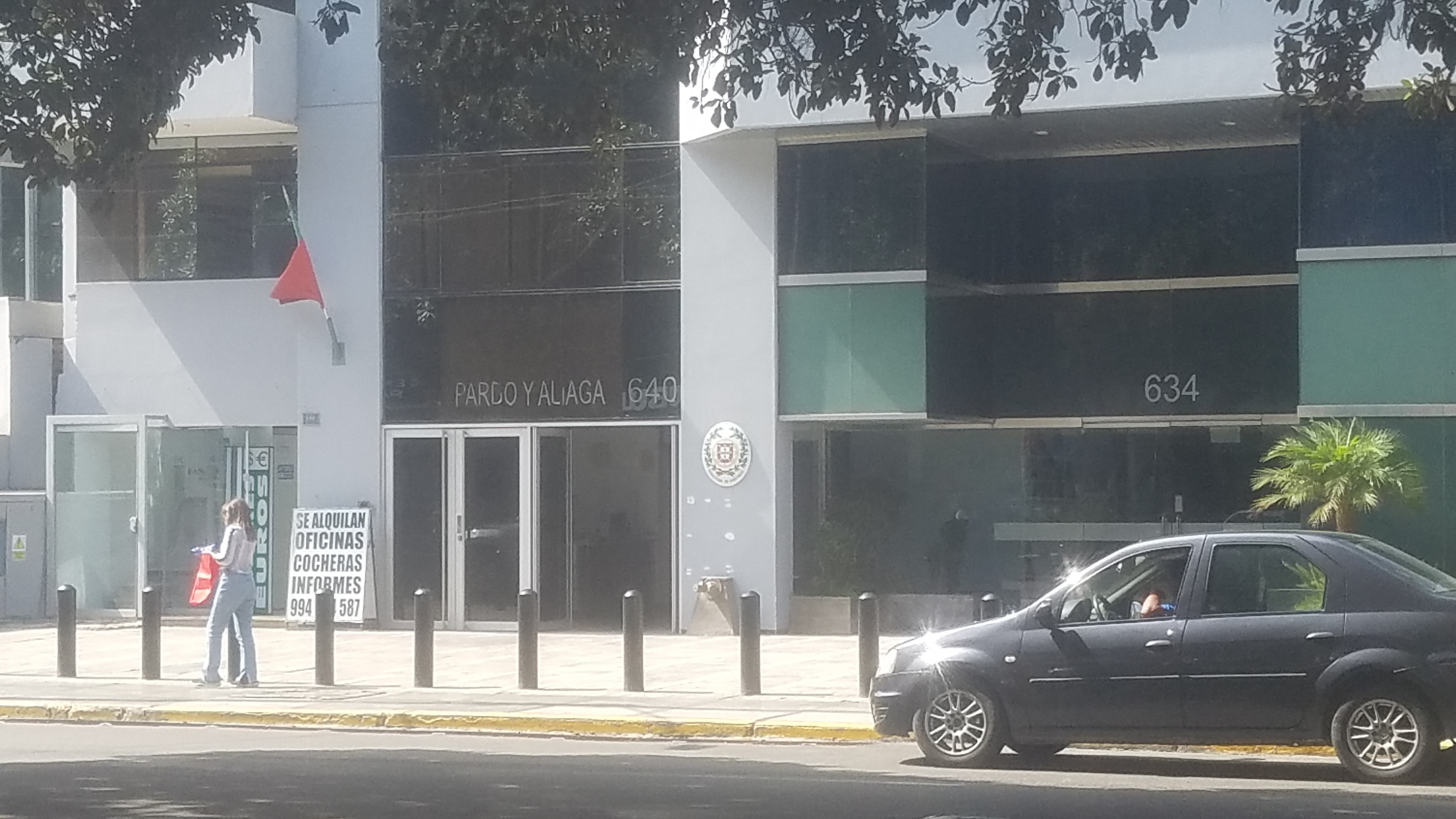
Portuguese embassy in Lima

== See also ==
- Foreign relations of Peru
- Foreign relations of Portugal
- List of ambassadors of Peru to Portugal
- List of ambassadors of Portugal to Peru

== Bibliography ==
- Amorim, Maria Adelina; Garcia Marques, Maria Lúcia; Brites Moita, Susana (2006). Dicionário Temático da Lusofonia (in Portuguese). Lissabon/Luanda/Praia/Maputo: ACLUS. ISBN 9724729354.
