= Coat of arms of Guayaquil =

- Armiger: City of Guayaquil
- Adopted: 1920
- Shield: Azure, a mullet throughout argent within a tressure of the same.
- Supporters: The circumference is surrounded on both sides by two olive branches in the shape of a crown, linked at the bottom by a ribbon of gules
- Motto: Por Guayaquil independiente (For independent Guayaquil)

The coat of arms of Guayaquil is used for the Ecuadorian city of Guayaquil. Adopted in 1920, it's composed of a circle in blue with an inscribed silver star. The circumference is surrounded on both sides by two olive branches in the shape of a crown, linked at the bottom by a ribbon of gules. Under the ribbon is the slogan "Por Guayaquil independiente" (For independent Guayaquil). It usually appears with an oval border in blue, although this is not an official version.

== Colonial coat of arms ==
Colonial coat of arms of Guayaquil

In colonial times, when the city was under the rule of Spain, Captain Diego de Urbina, by his own invention, designed a coat of arms for the city of Guayaquil, in which he tried to establish bonds of brotherhood between his hometown and his lineage in the same coat of arms in order to perpetuate the memory of his memorable feat, having rebuilt the city in 1541 and achieving the definitive consolidation of it. This shield is very similar to similar arms of the Spanish city of Orduña, where Urbina was a native.

In 1952, the Ecuadorian historian and genealogist Pedro Robles Chambers obtained the exact reconstruction of the colonial coat of arms of Guayaquil, thanks to the successful works that J. Gabriel Pino Roca had previously carried out, as well as a set of unpublished documents that Pedro José Huerta provided him. The same year, the Historical Research Center of Guayaquil published his work entitled Study on the Origin of the Colonial Coat of Arms of the City of Santiago de Guayaquil in which he said:

... it was Captain Diego de Urbina who on his own initiative created the coat of arms, for which he framed in the same coat of arms the one of his native city and the one of his lineage, in order to perpetuate the memory of his memorable feat (the one of to have reconstructed the city in 1541 and achieved its definitive consolidation), being without a doubt this the origin of the arms that the city of Santiago de Guayaquil adopted. I make this affirmation, after a meditated study about the arms of the city of Orduña, those of the family of the conqueror and the similarity that these show with those of our city.

— Study on the Origin of the Colonial Coat of Arms of the City of Santiago de Guayaquil, Pedro Robles Chambers

The coat of arms of the city of Guayaquil, the result of Urbina's inspiration, would be heraldically described as follows:

In the silver field, a castle of its color (old stone), and to its sinister a rampant crowned lion, of a red color, holding a flagpole also of its color, with a flag of gules (red) loaded with a silver cross, all placed on water waves of blue and silver. Bordure of gules (red) loaded with a chain of eight golden links.

Other more modern and rhetorically adequate descriptions say that it is conformed by a blazon of Spanish type in a field of azure, on water waves of azure and silver, open castle open gold, mauled in saber, crenelated by three battlements, donjonned and rinse of azure, lion crowned with gules holding the flag of the Spanish Empire. Bordure of gules loaded with gold chains, placed in a border, with elongated links.

The city of Guayaquil and its province used this emblem until the declaration of independence of the city on October 9, 1820. At present, this emblem is part of the coat of arms of the province of Guayas.

=== Meaning of the colonial coat of arms ===
The objective elements or entities are:

- The castle or tower, or part of the wall or battlements, represents being won, defended by the strength of personal virtue or power.
- The lion means braveness and courage.
- The Flags and Banners represent the state of the rich man, the leader of the people of war, as well as flags and banners that were won from their enemies.
- The saltire was won by arms in the victory won against the Moors who were in the city of Baeza, the day of the Apostle Saint Andrew. The cross is the symbol of this saint who holds the tool of his martyrdom. This victory took place in the year 1227 and those who were there put it on their shields.
- The waves, which also symbolize the waters of the Guayas River and the Gulf of Guayaquil, represent contrasts suffered with value and maturity.
- The chains remember the episodes of the battle of Las Navas de Tolosa in 1212, a symbol taken by several knights who showed off their courage there. The emblazoned form is currently associated with the eight borders of the coat of arms of Navarre.

The symbolism of the colors used in the shield are the following:

- Red or Gules means fire, daring, tricks, strength, war and blood expiration.
- Blue or Azure denotes zeal, justice, charity and loyalty to the crown.

With respect to the metals that are:

- Gold means power, perseverance, wisdom and nobility.
- Silver, symbolized by leaving the field blank and without a sign, represents innocence, integrity, wealth and expiration.

== The current coat of arms ==
José Joaquín de Olmedo, as President of the Superior Government Board of the Free Province of Guayaquil in November 1820, ordered that the official papers of the Cabildo bear the seal of a 5-pointed star, with a crown of laurels, a red bow and to one side the legend "Por Guayaquil independiente" (For independent Guayaquil). It became the official symbol of the city in November 1920.

=== Meaning of the current coat of arms ===
- The light blue color of the circumference represents values associated with the city of Guayaquil, such as justice, loyalty, charity, honesty and bravery.
- The red color in the bow represents courage, daring, the strength of the people, the war that gave independence to the city and the bloodshed during this war.
- The inscription "Por Guayaquil Independiente" (For independent Guayaquil) commemorates the struggle for the independence of the city, proclaimed on October 9, 1820.
- The star in the center of the coat of arms is an element taken from the flag of the city.
- The olive leaves represent the prosperity of the city, the richness of its fields and the fertility of the lands. Also, these branches symbolize peace and victory.
