= Flag of Guayaquil =

Flag

- Use: Civil and state flag
- Proportion: without legislation
- Adopted: October 9, 1820

The flag of Guayaquil was established after the victory of the emancipatory troops in the independence of the city on October 9, 1820, as the insignia of the Free Province of Guayaquil that encompassed several provinces of the current Ecuadorian coast. It is maintained that it was José Joaquín de Olmedo who devised the sky blue and white pavilion, being himself the one who designed the current coat of arms of the city. The flag is divided into five horizontal stripes, three of them sky blue and the other two white. In addition, in the central sky blue stripe there are three white stars.

In his "Historical Review", José de Villamil states that on October 9, 1820 "...by arrangement of the Junta (Government) was deployed the independent Guayaquil flag composed of five horizontal strips, three blue and two white and in the one from the center (blue) three stars...".

Within the history of the Ecuadorian flag, this flag is considered the fourth national flag, which flamed on the battlefield, as the insignia of the Yaguachi Battalion, during the victory of the independentist troops over the Spanish troops in the Battle of Pichincha. Within the republican history, it is the second one, if the red flag with a white X-cross is supposed to be valid, which was supposedly the one of August 10, 1809. In practice, it is the first flag that represented a truly free territory as that today is Ecuador.

There is still confusion about the representation of the three stars of the central stripe. It is believed that the stars represent the three main provinces of the Royal Audience of Quito, these being: Quito, Cuenca and Guayaquil. Some historians say that they represent the three main cities of the Free Province of Guayaquil, which are: Portoviejo, Machala and the capital city Guayaquil.
