= Luiz Augusto Saint-Brisson de Araújo Castro =

Brazilian diplomat (b. 1946)

Luiz Augusto Saint-Brisson
- Born: August 20, 1946; New York City
- Education: Rio Branco Institute

Luiz Augusto Saint-Brisson de Araújo Castro (born August 20, 1946, in New York City) is a Brazilian diplomat.

== Biography ==
He is the son of Myriam Saint-Brisson and João Augusto de Araújo Castro.

Castro completed the Rio Branco Institute's Curso Preparatório à Carreira Diplomática in 1966. From December 24, 1993, to August 12, 1997, he was appointed as the representative of the Brazilian government to the Organization of American States.

He was then appointed ambassador, first in Montevideo until June 13, 2000, then in Mexico City from 2003 to August 17, 2005, and finally in Lima until November 25, 2007.

Political offices
Preceded by Bernardo Pericás Neto	Representative of Brazil to the OAS; December 24, 1993–August 12, 1997	Succeeded by Carlos Alberto Leite Barbosa
Preceded by Renato Prado Guimarães	Ambassador of Brazil to Uruguay; August 12, 1997–June 13, 2000	Succeeded by Francisco Thompson-Flôres Netto
Preceded by Francisco de Paula de Almeida Nogueira Junqueira	Ambassador of Brazil to Mexico; 2003–August 17, 2005	Succeeded by Ivan Oliveira Cannabrava
Preceded by André Mattoso Maia Amado	Ambassador of Brazil to Peru; 2005–November 25, 2007	Succeeded by Jorge D'Escragnolle Taunay Filho
