= List of ambassadors of Peru to Portugal =

Ambassador of Peru to Portugal
- Great Seal of Peru
- Ministry of Foreign Affairs; Av. da Liberdade 144, Lisbon
- Residence: Calçada do Galvão 19, Lisbon
- Appointer: The president of Peru
- Formation: 1826
- Website: Embassy of Peru in Portugal

The extraordinary and plenipotentiary ambassador of Peru to the Portuguese Republic (Note: Alternatively, Extraordinary and Plenipotentiary Ambassador of Peru to the Republic of Portugal) is the official representative of the Republic of Peru to the Portuguese Republic.

Relations between Peru and what was then the Kingdom of Portugal were established on March 26, 1853 and elevated to embassy level in 1938 with the Portuguese Republic, having been maintained since. In contrast, Spain did not recognize Peru until after the Chincha Islands War, officially establishing relations in 1879.

The first representatives of Peru to "the Old Continent", José Gregorio Paredes, and José Joaquín de Olmedo, were appointed by Simón Bolívar in 1826. The first representative of Portugal, António José Alves Júnior, arrived in Lima and presented his credentials on November 15, 1945.

== List of representatives ==
Name	Portrait	Term begin	Term end	President	Notes
José Gregorio Paredes		1826	?	Simón Bolívar	First diplomatic agents.
José Joaquín de Olmedo		1826	?	Simón Bolívar	First diplomatic agents.
Alberto Ureta		1937	?	Óscar R. Benavides	As Consul-general.
Jorge MacLean		1949	1951	Manuel A. Odría	As ambassador. MacLean concluded his term in 1951, returning to Lima after being named as ambassador to Ecuador on the same year, but being assassinated shortly after in Cieneguilla.
Augusto Morelli Pando		1969	1972	Juan Velasco Alvarado	As ambassador.
Carmela Aguilar Ayanz		1980	1984	Fernando Belaúnde	First female ambassador to Portugal.
Manuel Checa Solari		N/A	N/A	Alan García	Checa was named as ambassador to Portugal in 1986, but died in Lima shortly after, on August 2.
Jorge Plasencia Malpica		1987	1989	Alan García	As ambassador.
Harry Belevan-McBride		1989	1993	Alan García	As ambassador.
Manuel Veramendi i Serra		2001	2006	Valentín Paniagua	As ambassador.
Luzmila Esther Zanabria Ishikawa		2006	2009	Alejandro Toledo	As ambassador.
Felipe Santiago Beraún Ugás		August 1, 2009	August 10, 2011	Alan García	As ambassador. He quit for health-related reasons.
Néstor Popolizio		November 1, 2011	2013	Ollanta Humala	As ambassador.
Enrique Armando Román Morey		October 7, 2013	2015	Ollanta Humala	As ambassador.
Gloria Lissette Nalvarte Simoni		March 1, 2016	2017	Ollanta Humala	As ambassador.
Hilda Maritza Puertas Valdivieso de Rodríguez		2017	2020	Pedro Pablo Kuczynski	As ambassador.
Carlos Manuel Gil De Montes Molinari		January 17, 2022	July 28, 2026	Pedro Castillo	As ambassador.

== See also ==
- List of ambassadors of Portugal to Peru
- List of ambassadors of Peru to Spain
- List of ambassadors of Peru to Brazil
