= Jorge D'Escragnolle Taunay Filho =

Brazilian diplomat (born 1947)

Jorge D'Escragnolle Taunay Filho (born June 1, 1947 in Paris) is a former Brazilian diplomat.

== Biography ==
Jorge d'Escragnolle Taunay Filho is the son of Mary Elizabeth Penna Costa and Jorge D'Escragnolle Taunay. On May 19, 1987, he was appointed secretary of legation in Lisbon and on June 22, 1990 in Harare. From September 9, 1999 to August 9, 2006 he was ambassador to Luanda and then headed the South America department of Itamaraty Palace until November 25, 2007. He was then appointed ambassador to Lima until 2011.

== See also ==
- Alfredo d'Escragnolle Taunay, Viscount of Taunay
- Afonso d'Escragnolle Taunay

Political offices
Preceded by Alexandre Addor Neto	Ambassador of Brazil to Angola; September 9, 1999–August 9, 2006	Succeeded by Marcelo Leonardo da Silva Vasconcelos
Preceded by Luiz Augusto Saint-Brisson de Araújo Castro	Ambassador of Brazil to Peru; November 25, 2007–2011	Succeeded by Carlos Alfredo Lazary Teixeira
