= Embassy of Brazil, Lima =

Diplomatic mission of Brazil to Peru

Embassy of Brazil in Lima
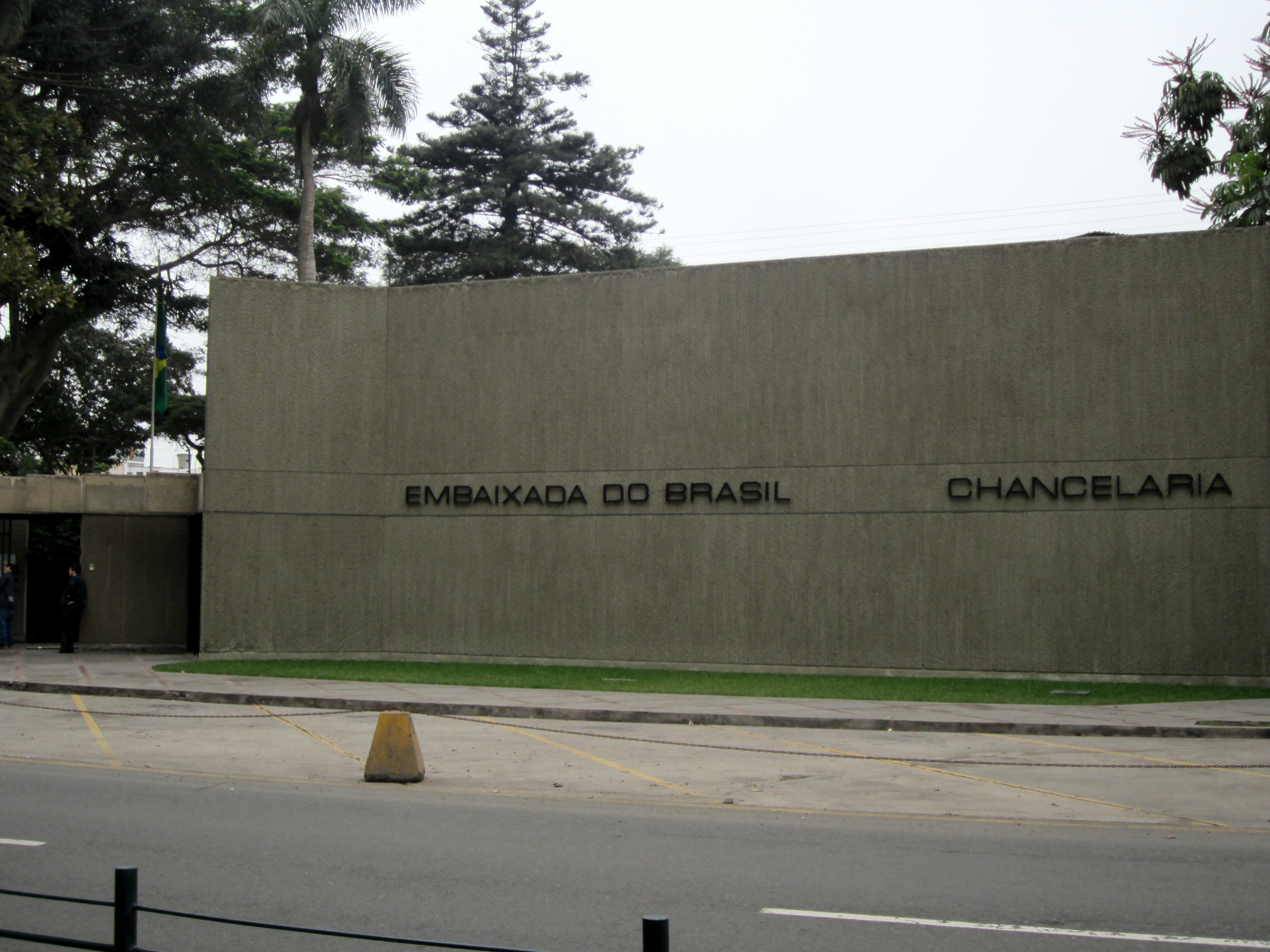
- Location: Lima, Peru
- Address: Av. José Pardo 850
- Opened: 1920s
- Ambassador: Clemente de Lima
- Website: Official website

The Embassy of Brazil in Peru (Portuguese: Embaixada do Brasil em Lima, Spanish: Embajada de Brasil en Lima) represents the permanent diplomatic mission of Brazil in Peru. It is located at 850 José Pardo Avenue, Miraflores District, Lima.

The embassy operates Vice Consulates in Iquitos and Cuzco, and the Instituto Guimarães Rosa (a cultural centre).

The current Brazilian ambassador to Peru is Clemente de Lima Baena Solares.

== History ==
Relations between both countries were established in 1826, and have continued since. The first mission to Peru operated until 1832, under the leadership of Duarte da Ponte Ribeiro.

The embassy was installed in its current headquarters in Miraflores in the 1920s. The current architectural complex was inaugurated on September 7, 1980, and follows the modernist style, with the exception of the Santos Pavilion, which is more classic. The Chancellery is located in Miraflores, 16 km from Jorge Chávez Airport and 10 km from Lima's Plaza Mayor.

The embassy's cultural centre, the Instituto Guimarães Rosa, was originally founded in 1962 as the Centro de Estudos Brasileiros, later the Centro Cultural Brasil-Peru (CCBP).

On April 15, 2025, the embassy granted political asylum to Nadine Heredia, former First Lady of Peru, after being sentenced to 15 years in prison by the Judiciary of Peru. The following day, she was granted permission to leave the country, arriving in Brasília the same day.

=== Residence ===
The Official Residence of the embassy is located in Monterrico, a neighbourhood of Santiago de Surco.

== List of representatives ==
The Ambassador Extraordinary and Plenipotentiary of Brazil to Peru (Portuguese: Embaixador extraordinário e plenipotenciário do Brasil no Peru) is the official representative of the Federative Republic of Brazil to the Republic of Peru.

Name	Portrait	Term begin	Term end	Head of state	Notes
Miguel Maria Lisboa		1830		Pedro I	
Felipe José Pereira Leal				Pedro II	Played a minor role in events such as the 1872 coup and the War of the Pacific.
Duarte da Ponte Ribeiro		1836	1841	Pedro II	
Carlos de Rostaing Lisboa		1908	1910	Afonso Pena	As chargé d'affaires.
Raul Régis de Oliveira		1910	1911	Hermes da Fonseca	As chargé d'affaires.
Augusto Cochrane de Alencar		October 9, 1911	December 16, 1918	Hermes da Fonseca	Envoy Extraordinary and Minister Plenipotentiary.
Jorge Oliveira Jobim		1918	1919	Rodrigues Alves	As chargé d'affaires.
Octavio Flaliho		1919	1920	Epitácio Pessoa	As chargé d'affaires.
Silvino Gurgel do Amaral		May 15, 1920	August 20, 1922	Epitácio Pessoa	Envoy Extraordinary and Minister Plenipotentiary.
Pedro de Moraes Barros		1922	1923	Artur Bernardes	As chargé d'affaires.
Abelardo Roças		January 18, 1923	February 6, 1924	Artur Bernardes	Envoy Extraordinary and Minister Plenipotentiary.
Pedro de Moraes Barros		1924	1926	Artur Bernardes	As chargé d'affaires.
Felix de Barros Cavalcanti de Lacerda		October 11, 1926	January 8, 1930	Washington Luís	Envoy Extraordinary and Minister Plenipotentiary.
Vasco Tristâo da Cunha		1930	1931	Getúlio Vargas	As chargé d'affaires.
Sylvio Rangel de Castro		1931		Getúlio Vargas	As chargé d'affaires.
Alberto Jorge de Ipanema Moreira		September 9, 1931	November 19, 1936	Getúlio Vargas	
Arau de Segaudas Machado Guimarâes		1936	1937	Getúlio Vargas	As chargé d'affaires.
José Tomás Nabuco de Gouvêa		April 29, 1937	November 26, 1937	Getúlio Vargas	
Edgar Rangel do Monte		1937	1938	Getúlio Vargas	As chargé d'affaires.
Lucilio Antônio da Cunha Bueno		March 2, 1938	March 11, 1938	Getúlio Vargas	
Edgar Rangel do Monte		1938		Getúlio Vargas	
Luiz Avelino Gurgel do Amaral		July 10, 1936	June 4, 1940	Getúlio Vargas	
Luiz Leivas Bastian Pinto		1940	1941	Getúlio Vargas	As chargé d'affaires.
Glauco Ferreira de Sousa		1941		Getúlio Vargas	As chargé d'affaires.
Pedro de Moraes Barros		July 18, 1941	February 17, 1945	Getúlio Vargas	
Luiz Pereira Ferreira de Faro Junior		February 16, 1945	September 27, 1951	José Linhares	
Waldemar de Araújo		1951	1952	Getúlio Vargas	As chargé d'affaires.
Caio de Mello Franco		January 15, 1952	October 3, 1953	Getúlio Vargas	
Waldemar de Araújo		1953		Getúlio Vargas	As chargé d'affaires.
Edgar Bandeira Fraga de Castro		October 30, 1953	June 29, 1956	Getúlio Vargas	
Gustavo Barroso		1956	1956	Juscelino Kubitschek	Sent to the inauguration of Manuel Prado to the presidency of Peru.
Antonio Carlos de Abreu e Silva		1956		Juscelino Kubitschek	As chargé d'affaires.
Alberto Raposo Lopes		1956		Juscelino Kubitschek	As chargé d'affaires.
Orlando Leite Ribeiro		October 17, 1956	June 12, 1962	Juscelino Kubitschek	
Guy Marie de Castro Brandâo		1962		João Goulart	As chargé d'affaires.
Raul Bopp		November 12, 1962	August 4, 1963	João Goulart	
Fernando Ronald de Carvalho		1963		João Goulart	As chargé d'affaires.
Sizinio Pontes Nogueira		1966	1967	Humberto de Alencar Castelo Branco	
Joâo Augusto de Araujo Castro		January 23, 1967	June 30, 1968	Artur da Costa e Silva	
Sizinio Pontes Nogueira		1968		Artur da Costa e Silva	As chargé d'affaires.
Martim Francisco Lafayete de Andrade		November 9, 1968	May 8, 1969	Artur da Costa e Silva	
Antônio Carlos de Abreu Silva		1969		Emílio Garrastazu Médici	As chargé d'affaires.
George Álvares Maclei		October 16, 1969	November 6, 1970	Emílio Garrastazu Médici	
Antônio Carlos de Abreu Silva		1970	1971	Emílio Garrastazu Médici	As chargé d'affaires.
Manoel Antônio de Pimentel Brandâo		January 26, 1971	January 14, 1975	Emílio Garrastazu Médici	As chargé d'affaires.
José Constâncio Austregésilo de Athayde		January 15, 1975	February 19, 1975	Ernesto Geisel	
Carlos Santos Veras		February 20, 1975	March 24, 1975	Ernesto Geisel	As chargé d'affaires.
Manoel Emilio Pereira Guilhon		March 25, 1975	October 13, 1975	Ernesto Geisel	
Júlio Gonçalves Sanchez		December 6, 1975	December 31, 1975	Ernesto Geisel	As chargé d'affaires.
Manoel Emilio Pereira Guilhon		1976		João Figueiredo	
José Osvaldo de Meira Penna		November 1976		João Figueiredo	
Vasco Mariz		October 25, 1982	1984	João Figueiredo	
Raul Fernando Belford Roxo Leite Ribeiro		1990	1996	Fernando Collor de Mello	
Luis Carlos Coutinho		1996	1998	Fernando Henrique Cardoso	He was one of the hostages during the Japanese embassy hostage crisis.
José Viegas Filho		1998	2001	Fernando Henrique Cardoso	
André Mattoso Maia Amado		2001	2004	Fernando Henrique Cardoso	
Luiz Augusto Saint-Brisson de Araújo Castro		2005	2007	Luiz Inácio Lula da Silva	
Jorge D'Escragnolle Taunay Filho		November 25, 2007		Luiz Inácio Lula da Silva	Son of diplomat Jorge D’Escragnolle Taunay.
Carlos Alfredo Lazary Teixeira		July 21, 2011		Dilma Rousseff	
Sérgio França Danese		January 14, 2022	2023	Jair Bolsonaro	
Clemente de Lima Baena Solares		August 16, 2023		Luiz Inácio Lula da Silva	

== See also ==
- Brazil–Peru relations
- List of ambassadors of Peru to Brazil
