= Guayaquil Department =

Department of Gran Colombia

Coordinates: 2°12′S 79°58′W

- Capital: Guayaquil
- History
  - Established: 25 June 1822
Preceded by	Succeeded by
Gran Colombia; Free Province of Guayaquil	Ecuador
- Today part of: Ecuador; Peru (parts of it)

Guayaquil Department was one of the departments of Gran Colombia created in 1824 in 1830.

It bordered the Ecuador Department in the east, the Azuay Department in the South, and the Pacific Ocean in the West.

== Subdivisions ==
The department had two provinces and nine cantons: Guayaquil Province (capital Guayaquil) with cantons Guayaquil, Daule, Babahoyo, Baba, Punta de Santa Elena and Machala; and Manabí Province (capital Portoviejo). with cantons Portoviejo, Jipijapa, and Montecristi.
