= La victoria de Junín =

Poem by José Joaquín Olmedo

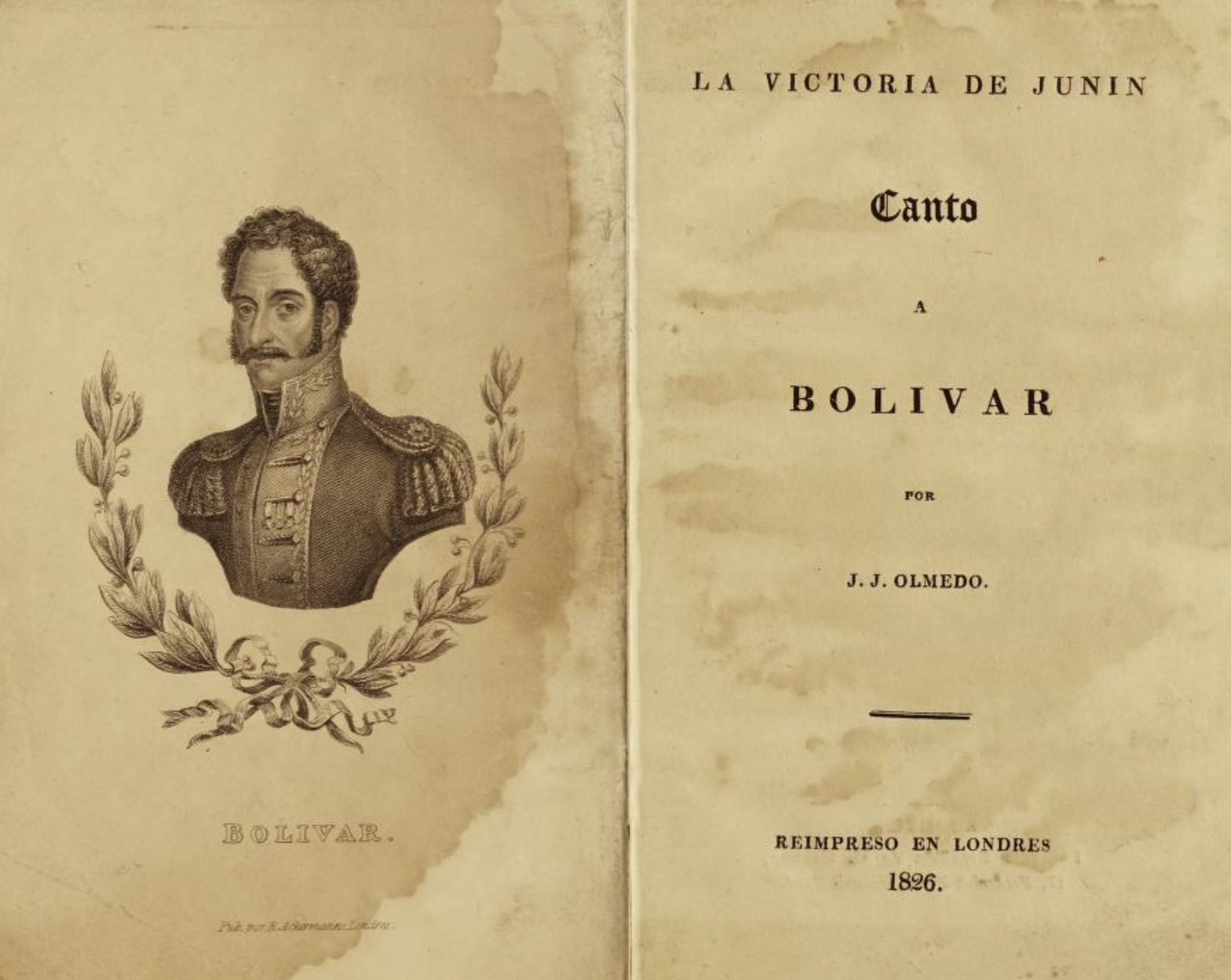
The Victory of Junín, Song to Bolívar, poem by José Joaquín de Olmedo

La victoria de Junín: Canto a Bolívar (1825) is a poem by José Joaquín Olmedo of Ecuador. It was written after the battle of Junín and Ayacucho in 1824. The poem recounts the triumphs of Simón Bolívar at the battle of Junín, and particularly the liberation of Perú from the Spanish. It pictures the Latin American fighters for independence from Spain as the legitimate heirs of the Incas. The poem consists of 960 verses. Some historians believe that Simón Bolívar himself commissioned the poem to be written.
