= Song of October Ninth =

- The Flag of Guayaquil is raised while singing the anthem.

Song
- Language: Spanish
- English title: Song of October Ninth
- Written: 1821
- Genre: patriotic song
- Composer: Ana Villamil Ycaza
- Lyricist: José Joaquín de Olmedo

Song of October Ninth (Spanish: Canción al 9 de octubre) is a poem written by José Joaquín de Olmedo in 1821, to commemorate the 1820 Independence of Guayaquil. A mayoral decree on July 8, 1898 officially declared it as "Himno al 9 de Octubre"; this Anthem in honor of Guayaquil's Independence became widely known as Guayaquil's Anthem.

== Song of October Ninth ==
- Lyrics: José Joaquín de Olmedo, 1821.
- Music: Ana Villamil Ycaza, 1895.
Coro
Saludemos gozosos
En armoniosos cánticos
Esta aurora gloriosa
Que anuncia libertad
Libertad, libertad!

I
¿Veis esa luz amable
que raya en el oriente,
cada vez más luciente
en gracia celestial?
Esa es la aurora plácida
¡que anuncia libertad!
Esa es la aurora plácida
¡que anuncia libertad!

II
Nosotros guardaremos
con ardor indecible
tu fuego inextinguible
¡oh santa Libertad!
Como vestales vírgenes
que sirven a tu altar,
como vestales vírgenes
que sirven a tu altar

III
Haz que en el suelo que amas
florezcan en todas partes
el culto de las artes
y el honor nacional.
Y da con mano pródiga
los bienes de la paz,
y da con mano pródiga
los bienes de la paz.
