= Ecuador Department =

One of the departments of Gran Colombia

Coordinates: 0°13′S 78°31′W

- Capital: Quito
- History
  - Established: 25 June 1822
Preceded by	Succeeded by
Gran Colombia	Ecuador
- Today part of: Ecuador; Peru (parts of it)

Ecuador Department was one of the departments of Gran Colombia created in 1824.

It had borders to:

- Azuay Department in the South.
- Guayaquil Department in the West.

== Subdivisions ==
3 provincias and 15 cantones:

- Pichincha Province. Capital: Quito. Cantones: Quito, Machachi, Latacunga, Quijos y Esmeraldas.
- Imbabura Province. Capital: Ibarra. Cantones: Ibarra, Otavalo, Cotacachi y Cayambe.
- Chimborazo Province. Capital: Riobamba. Cantones: Riobamba, Ambato, Guano, Guaranda, Alausí y Macas.
