= Jorge D'Escragnolle Taunay =

Brazilian diplomat (1917–1996)

Jorge D'Escragnolle Taunay (Rio de Janeiro, December 15, 1917 — 1996) was a Brazilian diplomat.

== Biography ==
Jorge D'Escragnolle Taunay was the son of Maria Antonieta de Castro Cerqueira de Taunay and Raul de Taunay. He married Mary Elizabeth d'Escragnolle Taunay. In 1944 he joined the foreign service under Oswaldo Aranha as an assessor in Boston and New York City. He then headed the archives of the Ministry of Foreign Affairs.

During Getúlio Vargas' second term, he served as head of the Foreign Minister's office, secretary of the Conselho de Imigração e Colonização (Immigration and Colonization Authority), and sat on the Conselho de Segurança Nacional (Security Council). He was subsequently employed in Copenhagen, Mexico City, Buenos Aires and Lima. In the meantime, Taunay studied at the Rio Branco Institute.

From 1962 to 1963 he served as Consul General in Barcelona and from 1964 to 1966 in Montevideo. He was then posted as Envoy Extraordinary and Minister Plenipotentiary in Cape Town and Pretoria from February 23, 1966 to July 31, 1969. In 1974 he was appointed ambassador to Beirut and was also accredited to the government in Amman until April 1977. After a subsequent stint as ambassador in Panama City until 1983, he was accredited as ambassador in New Delhi from 1985 to 1986 and at the same time with the governments in Kathmandu and Colombo.

== See also ==
- Jorge D'Escragnolle Taunay Filho
- Alfredo d'Escragnolle Taunay, Viscount of Taunay
- Afonso d'Escragnolle Taunay

Political offices
Preceded by Sérgio Rezende Carneiro de Lacerde	Ambassador of Brazil to South Africa; February 23, 1966–July 31, 1969	Succeeded by Marcelo Didier
Preceded by Carlos da Ponte Ribeiro Eiras	Ambassador of Brazil to Lebanon; 1974–April 1977	Succeeded by Paulo da Costa Franco
Preceded by Jorge de Sá Almeida	Ambassador of Brazil to Panama; April 1977–1983	Succeeded by Carlos Antônio Bettencourt Bueno
Preceded by Roberto Luiz Assumpção de Araújo	Ambassador of Brazil to India; 1985–1986	Succeeded by Vera Barrouin Machado
