= List of ambassadors of Portugal to Peru =

Ambassador of Portugal to Peru
- Style: His Excellency (formal); Mr. Ambassador (informal)
- Residence: Embassy of Portugal, Lima
- Appointer: President of the Portuguese Republic with the advice and consent of the Government
- Website: Embaixada de Portugal no Peru

The Portuguese Ambassador to Peru is the official representative of the Portuguese Republic to the Government of Peru.

The Portuguese Embassy is located at 640 Pardo y Aliaga Avenue, Lima.

The current ambassador is Joaquim Alberto de Sousa Moreira de Lemos, who succeeded Afonso Henriques Abreu de Azeredo Malheiro in 2021.

Relations between Peru and what was then the Kingdom of Portugal were established on March 26, 1853 and elevated to embassy level in 1938 with the Portuguese Republic, having been maintained since. In contrast, Spain did not recognize Peru until after the Chincha Islands War, when relations were officially established in 1879.

The first representative of Portugal, António José Alves Júnior, arrived in Lima and presented his credentials on November 15, 1945.

== List of representatives ==
Name	Title	Appointment	Presentation	Termination	Notes
António José Alves Júnior	Minister Plenipotentiary	November 10, 1945	November 15, 1945	April 10, 1949	
João Sainte Marie de Morais	Chargé d'affaires	April 11, 1949		April 21, 1953	
Amaro do Sacramento Monteiro	Legation Officer	April 22, 1953		May 25, 1956	
Frederico José de Sousa Teixeira de Sampaio	Chargé d'affaires	June 14, 1956		March 8, 1959	
Carlos Saporiti Machado Barros	Chargé d'affaires	March 9, 1959		November 1, 1959	
Humberto Alves Morgado	Chargé d'affaires	November 2, 1959		1961	
José dos Santos Silva Taveira	Chargé d'affaires	October 11, 1961	October 13, 1961	September 22, 1964	Legation elevated to embassy in 1964.
José dos Santos Silva Taveira	Ambassador	September 22, 1964	September 22, 1964	June 25, 1966	Continued post as first ambassador.
Salvador Augusto de Sousa Sampayo Garrido	Ambassador	July 16, 1966	July 27, 1966	September 1, 1970	
Adriano António de Carvalho	Ambassador	September 6, 1970	October 14, 1970	November 17, 1974	
José Manuel de Noronha Gamito	Ambassador	November 28, 1974		February 18, 1979	
António Augusto Coelho Bártolo	Ambassador	February 19, 1979		May 1986	
Luiz Martinez Pazos Alonso	Ambassador	May 12, 1986	May 22, 1986	May 7, 1988	
José Fernando Moreira da Cunha	Interim chargé d'affaires	May 7, 1988		May 7, 1989	
Augusto José Pestana Saraiva Peixoto	Interim chargé d'affaires	May 7, 1989			
Inácio José D'Araújo Rebello de Andrade	Ambassador	October 1, 1990	October 19, 1990	January 7, 1993	
José Lourenço Pereira de Sousa Sarmento	Ambassador	June 11, 1993	June 16, 1993	May 12, 1997	
Alexandre Manuel Galvão Mexia de Almeida Fernandes	Ambassador	February 19, 1998	March 6, 1998	March 19, 2003	
Mário Alberto Lino da Silva	Ambassador		December 3, 2003	October 13, 2008	
Nuno António Ribeiro de Bessa Lopes	Ambassador		January 7, 2009	December 17, 2012	
Helena Margarida Rezende de Almeida Coutinho	Ambassador		March 19, 2013	October 20, 2017	
Afonso Henriques Abreu de Azeredo Malheiro	Ambassador	January 15, 2018	January 31, 2018	October 6, 2021	
Joaquim Alberto de Sousa Moreira de Lemos	Ambassador	December 24, 2021		July 28, 2026	
