= List of ambassadors of Peru to Brazil =

Ambassador of Peru to the Federative Republic of Brazil
- Great Seal of Peru
- Ministry of Foreign Affairs; Av. Das Nações 43, Brasilia
- Appointer: The president of Peru
- Inaugural holder: José Domingo Cáceres
- Formation: August 10, 1826
- Website: Embassy of Peru in Brazil

The ambassador extraordinary and plenipotentiary of Peru to the Federative Republic of Brazil is the official representative of the Republic of Peru to the Federative Republic of Brazil.

Relations between both countries were established in 1826, and have continued since.

== List of representatives ==
Name	Portrait	Term begin	Term end	President	Notes
José Domingo Cáceres		August 10, 1826	April 25, 1827	Simón Bolívar	Chargé d'affairs and General consul
Buenaventura Seoane		November 13, 1858	February 26, 1862	Ramón Castilla	Resident minister
Benigno González-Vigil y Cossío		June 15, 1864	October 5, 1868	Juan Antonio Pezet	Chargé d'affairs, later resident minister
José María La Torre Bueno Zegarra		March 31, 1869	October 5, 1869	José Balta	Resident minister
Luis Mesones		November 12, 1869	August 10, 1872	José Balta	Resident minister
Manuel Irigoyen Larrea		May 10, 1874	1877	Manuel Pardo	Resident minister, then minister plenipotentiary
Aníbal Víctor de La Torre y Vidaurre		May 1878	February 1880	Mariano Ignacio Prado	Minister plenipotentiary
José Antonio de Lavalle		September 1879	June 19, 1880	Mariano Ignacio Prado	Minister plenipotentiary
Pedro Paz Soldán y Unanue		May 1, 1884	?	Miguel Iglesias	Resident minister
Guillermo Seoane		November 30, 1890	December 22, 1894	Remigio Morales Bermúdez	Minister plenipotentiary
Francisco Rosas Balcázar		May 7, 1896	March 1899	Nicolás de Piérola	Minister plenipotentiary
Amador del Solar Cárdenas		November 29, 1900	February 6, 1903	Eduardo López de Romaña	Minister plenipotentiary
Hernán Velarde		February 3, 1903	May 24, 1904	Eduardo López de Romaña	Minister plenipotentiary
Guillermo Seoane		May 24, 1904	April 28, 1905	Serapio Calderón	Minister plenipotentiary
Eugenio Larrabure y Unanue		August 18, 1905	February 2, 1908	José Pardo y Barreda	Minister plenipotentiary
Hernán Velarde		March 1912	March 21, 1916	Augusto B. Leguía	Minister plenipotentiary
Alejandro de la Fuente y de las Casas		1916	December 23, 1917	José Pardo y Barreda	Chargé d'affairs
Felipe de Osma y Pardo		September 20, 1917	July 11, 1919	José Pardo y Barreda	Minister plenipotentiary
Dálmace Moner Tolmos		February 27, 1920	August 25, 1921	Augusto B. Leguía	Minister plenipotentiary
Ernesto de Tezanos Pinto y Segovia		October 5, 1921	December 20, 1923	Augusto B. Leguía	Minister plenipotentiary
Víctor Manuel Maúrtua		December 20, 1923	1928	Augusto B. Leguía	Minister plenipotentiary
José María de la Jara y Ureta		1931	1931	David Samanez Ocampo	Minister plenipotentiary
Ventura García Calderón Rey		1932	1933	Luis Miguel Sánchez Cerro	Minister plenipotentiary
Jorge Prado Ugarteche		1934	1934	Óscar R. Benavides	Ambassador
Carlos Concha Cárdenas		1936	1936	Óscar R. Benavides	Ambassador
Jorge Prado Ugarteche		1938	1944	Óscar R. Benavides	Ambassador
Felipe Tudela y Barreda		1951	1953	Manuel A. Odría	Ambassador
Carlos Miró-Quesada Laos		1953	1954	Manuel A. Odría	Ambassador
Alberto Freundt Rosell		1954	1955	Manuel A. Odría	Ambassador
Fernando Gamio Palacio		1956	1956	Manuel A. Odría	Ambassador
Carlos Echecopar Herce		1956	1961	Manuel Prado Ugarteche	Ambassador
Julio Doig Sánchez		1968	1970	Juan Velasco Alvarado	Ambassador
Alberto Ruiz Eldredge		1970	1974	Juan Velasco Alvarado	Ambassador
Gonzalo Fernández Puyó		1974	1978	Juan Velasco Alvarado	Ambassador
José Carlos Mariátegui Arellano		1978	?	Francisco Morales Bermúdez	Ambassador
Hugo Ernesto Palma Valderrama		1986	1990	Alan García	Ambassador
Antonio Belaúnde Moreyra		1994	1995	Alberto Fujimori	Ambassador
Alejandro Gordillo Fernández		1995	?	Alberto Fujimori	Ambassador
Eduardo Ponce Vivanco		1999	2001	Alberto Fujimori	Ambassador
Hernán Couturier		2004	2007	Alejandro Toledo	Ambassador
Hugo de Zela		2006	2010	Alan García	Ambassador
Ricardo Jorge Ghibellini Harten		2010	2011	Alan García	Ambassador
Jorge Bayona Medina		August 20, 2011	?	Ollanta Humala	Ambassador
Vicente Rojas Escalante		2016	2019	Pedro Pablo Kuczynski	Ambassador
Javier Yépez Verdeguer		2019	November 4, 2021	Martín Vizcarra	Ambassador. Accredited to Suriname from October 23, 2020.
Rómulo Fernando Acurio Traverso		January 1, 2022	December 7, 2022	Pedro Castillo	Ambassador

== See also ==
- List of ambassadors of Brazil to Peru
- List of ambassadors of Peru to Portugal
