= José Joaquín de Olmedo =

President of Ecuador

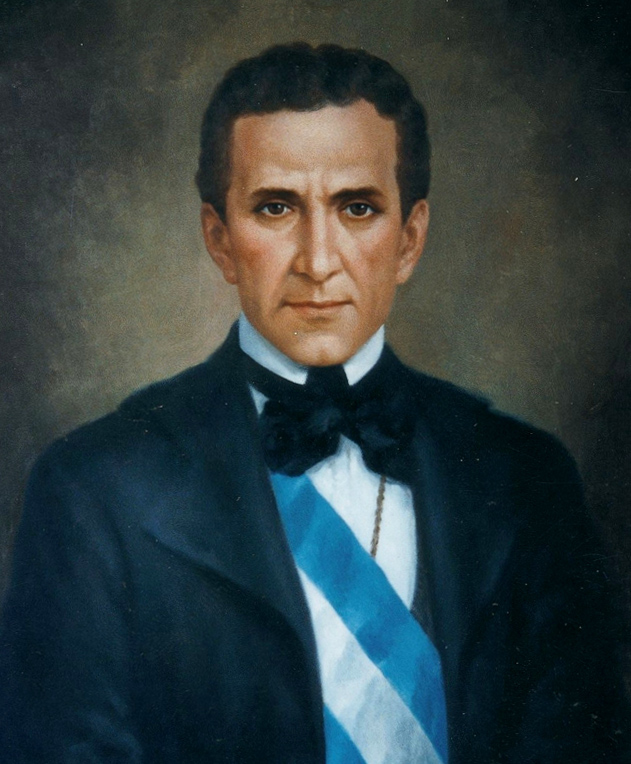

Head of Provisional Government of Ecuador
- In office 6 March 1845 – 8 December 1845
- Vice President: Pablo Merino
- Preceded by: Juan José Flores (as President of Ecuador)
- Succeeded by: Vicente Ramón Roca (as President of Ecuador)

Vice President of Ecuador
- In office 12 September 1830 – 15 September 1831
- President: Juan José Flores
- Preceded by: Position created
- Succeeded by: José Modesto Larrea

Personal details
- Born: 20 March 1780 Guayaquil, Ecuador
- Died: 19 February 1847 (aged 66) Guayaquil, Ecuador
- Spouse: María Rosa Icaza y Silva
- Education: Universidad Mayor de San Marcos

José Joaquín de Olmedo y Maruri (20 March 1780 – 19 February 1847) was President of Ecuador from 6 March 1845 to 8 December 1845. A patriot and poet, he was the son of the Spanish Captain Don Miguel de Olmedo y Troyano and the Guayaquilean Ana Francisca de Maruri y Salavarría.

== Biography ==
On 9 October 1820, Olmedo and others declared the city of Guayaquil independent from Spain. He was President of the Free Province of Guayaquil until it was united to Gran Colombia by Simón Bolívar against Olmedo's will. He was also twice mayor of Guayaquil.

As a result of Guayaquil's annexation to Colombia, Olmedo travelled to Peru in a self-imposed exile. He became active in Peruvian politics, forming part of the country's first Constituent Congress and representing it diplomatically in Europe, specifically as minister to France and Portugal, among other states.

He was Vice President of Ecuador from 1830 to 1831, and became President of Ecuador from 6 March 1845, to 8 December 1845, surviving an attempted coup on 18 June of that year.

He was also a noted poet who emphasized patriotic themes. His best-known work is La victoria de Junin, which pictures the Latin American fighters for independence from Spain as the legitimate heirs of the Incas.

Olmedo devoted his life to Guayaquil, he created the Guayaquilean flag and coat of arms, and in 1821 he composed the Song to the October Ninth, which would become the Guayaquil Anthem.

He is quoted as saying "He who does not hope to win has already lost."

The José Joaquín de Olmedo International Airport in Guayaquil is named after him.

== Independence of Guayaquil ==
José Joaquín de Olmedo was a participant in a group organized by don José de Antepara that supported secession from the Spanish Empire. The group was formed the night of 1 October 1820 in the home of José de Villamil under the guise of a quinceañera for Isabela Morlás, who was the daughter of fellow secessionist Pedro Morlás. Gregorio Escobedo, Francisco de Paula Lavayen, Luis Fernando Vivero, and José Rivas also participated, as well as Venezuelans Febres Cordero, Miguel de Letamendi, and Luis Urdaneta, among others. The group, known as the "Forge of Vulcan," concluded the meeting with an oath of loyalty to the cause by those present.

During the days following the meeting, Antepara and Villamil managed to convince the military leaders in charge of Guayaquil's defense to join the cause of independence. However, they decided to give leadership of the liberationist movement to Olmedo. On 3 October, Villamil visited Olmedo to offer him the position of leadership, but Olmedo declined because he thought that the movement should be led by someone with military instead of political experience. Nevertheless, Olmedo confirmed his commitment to the cause and offered to help with political and diplomatic matters once independence was reached.

The cause of independence, eventually led by León de Febres Cordero, continued in the following days with exhaustive planning of the rebellion that aimed to keep losses and use of weapons to a minimum. Finally, on the night of 8 October the revolution began with the capture of several military outposts by the rebels and the apprehension of authorities loyal to the Spanish crown. The rebellion continued until the morning of 9 October.

== Works ==
During his life, he dedicated part of his time to the creation of novels, songs, poems, and other kinds of literary works. Among his most well known works are: Canto a Bolívar; Al General Flores, vencedor en Miñarica; and Alfabeto para un niño. He designed the flag and crest of Guayaquil and wrote the lyrics of its anthem.

In 1808 he was inspired to compose the prologue to the tragedy El Duque de Viseo de Quintana and his poem El Árbol, which he finished in 1809. El Árbol contains two parts: one that is philosophical and has great aesthetic sense, and one that is less carefully constructed which ends the poem. This makes it seem as if there were two distinct verses brought together.

In January 1811 he was still in Mexico and read his poem Improntu. In the beginning of 1817 he traveled to Lima and wrote A un amigo, don Gaspar Rico....

In 1821 he wrote Canción al 9 de octubre, considered to be the first anthem of the Ecuadorian territory. In 1823 in Lima he edited his 45-page translation from English of Essay on Man by Alexander Pope. In 1825 he composed Marcha and the poem La Libertad.

In 1837 he wrote Canción del 10 de agosto, which served as a precursor to the current national anthem as demonstrated by Espinosa Pólit.

In 1840 he wrote En la muerte de mi hermana. In 1843 he edited Ocios poéticos del General Flores y una oda en su obsequio in 52 pages.

From then on his poems began to be published with great success. In 1848 a volume of Obras Poéticas, a collection revised and corrected by Olmedo, was released in Valparaiso months before his death. The second edition was issued in Paris in 1853, with 214 pages. There are later publications as well.

Political offices
Preceded by Position created	Vice President of Ecuador; 1830–1831	Succeeded by Modesto Larrea y Carrión
Preceded by Juan José Flores	President of Ecuador; 1845	Succeeded by Vicente Ramón Roca
