= Azuay Department =

Department of Gran Colombia

Coordinates: 2°53′S 79°00′W

- Capital: Cuenca
- History
  - Established: 25 June 1822
Preceded by	Succeeded by
Gran Colombia	Ecuador
- Today part of: Ecuador; Peru; Colombia; Brazil

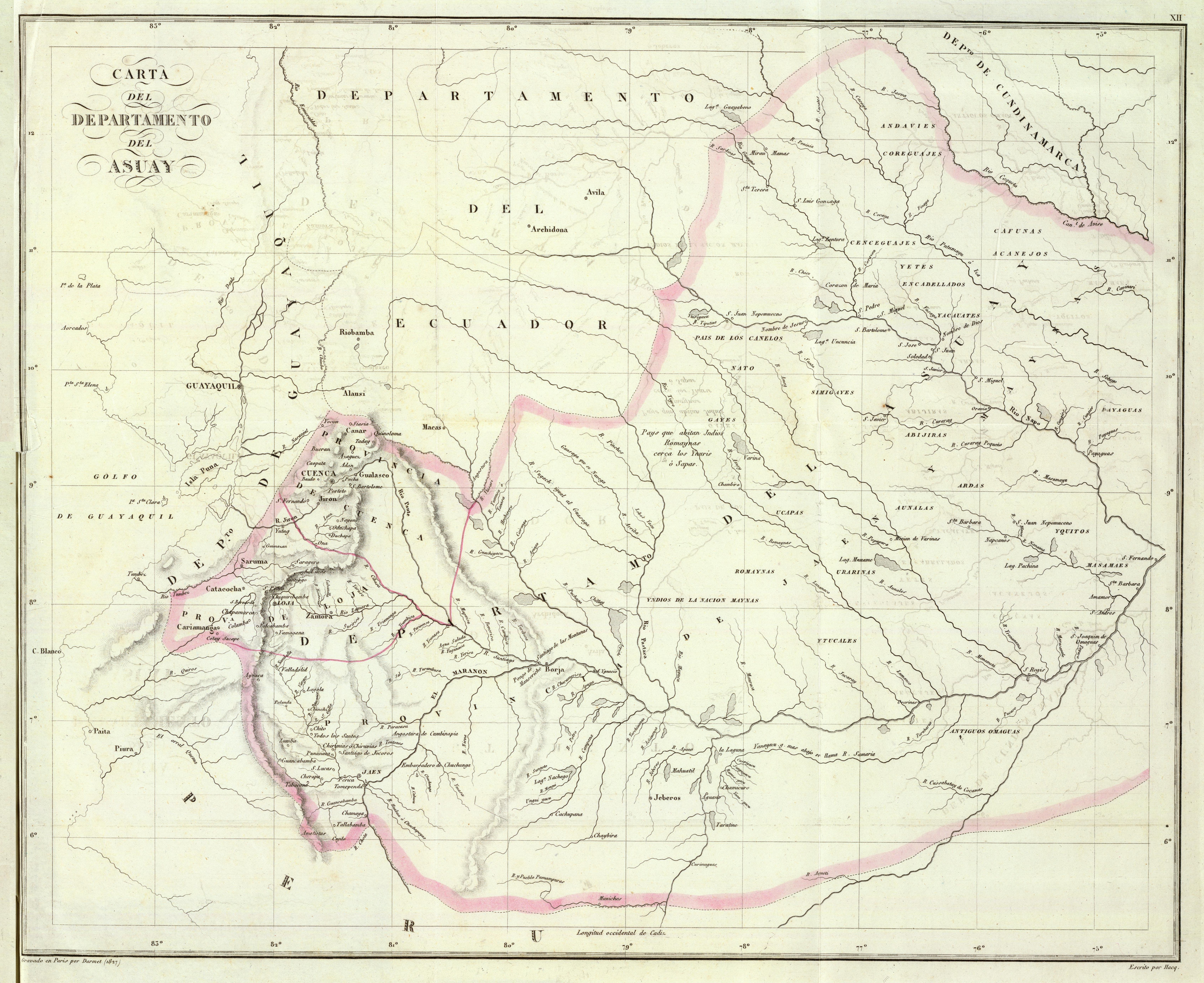
Map of Azuay Department

Azuay Department was created with the 1824 reform of the subdivisions of Gran Colombia.

- Cuenca Province - Capital: Cuenca. Cantons: Cuenca, Cañar, Gualaseo y Girón.
- Loja Province - Capital: Loja. Cantons: Loja, Catacocha, Cariamanga y Zaruma.
- Jaén de Bracamoros y Maynas Province - Capital: Jaén de Bracamoros. Cantons: Jaén, Borja y Jeberos.
