= Timeline of the Spanish American wars of independence =

This is a timeline of events related to the Spanish American wars of independence. Numerous wars against Spanish rule in Spanish America took place during the early 19th century, from 1808 until 1829, directly related to the Napoleonic French invasion of Spain. The conflict started with short-lived governing juntas established in Chuquisaca and Quito opposing the composition of the Supreme Central Junta of Seville. When the Central Junta fell to the French, numerous new Juntas appeared all across the Americas, eventually resulting in a chain of newly independent countries stretching from Argentina and Chile in the south, to Mexico in the north. After the death of the king Ferdinand VII, in 1833, only Cuba and Puerto Rico remained under Spanish rule, until the Spanish–American War in 1898.

These conflicts can be characterized both as civil wars and wars of national liberation, since the majority of the combatants were Spanish Americans on both sides, and the goal of the conflict for one side was the independence of the Spanish colonies in the Americas. In addition, the wars were related to the more general Latin American wars of independence, which include the conflicts in Haiti and Brazil (Brazil's independence shared a common starting point with Spanish America's, since both were triggered by Napoleon's invasion of the Iberian Peninsula, when the Portuguese royal family resettled in Brazil).

The war in Europe, and the resulting absolutist restoration ultimately convinced the Spanish Americans of the need to establish independence from the mother country, so various revolutions broke out in Spanish America. Moreover, the process of Latin American independence took place in the general political and intellectual climate that emerged from the Age of Enlightenment and that influenced all of the so-called Atlantic Revolutions, including the earlier revolutions in the United States and France. Nevertheless, the wars in, and the independence of, Spanish America were the result of unique developments within the Spanish Monarchy.

== Early 1700s ==
=== Events in the Viceroyalty of New Granada ===
- Events in the New Kingdom of Granada
  - The Viceroyalty of New Granada is established out of territories from the Viceroyalty of Perú. This is done in order to encourage further economic development of the territories of New Granada, Quito and Venezuela. This is done as part of the Bourbon Reforms enacted by the Spanish Monarchy. Its first acting viceroy, Antonio Ignacio de la Pedrosa y Guerrero, takes office on June 13, 1718.

== 1760s ==
=== Events in the Viceroyalty of New Granada ===
- Events in the Kingdom of Quito
  - The Quito Revolt of 1765, or Rebellion of the Barrios (Rebellion of the Neighbourhoods), takes place. A series of revolts begin in the city of Quito, part of the Real Audiencia of Quito, within the Viceroyalty of New Granada, after new taxes on alcoholic beverages are imposed by the Spanish Crown. (May 22, 1765)
  - A coalition of upper-class Criollo and middle and lower-class Mestizo inhabitants of the barrios (neighbourhoods) of Quito overthrow the Spanish viceregal authorities in the context of the Quito Revolt of 1765. They establish and independent government for the Province of Quito and even propose proclaiming the Count of Selva Florida, Manuel Guerrero Ponce de León, as king of Quito, but he refuses. (June 27, 1765)
  - After a series of political differences among the members of the independent government of Quito, established during the Quito Revolt of 1765, viceregal troops arrive from the city of Guayaquil and re-establish the viceregal authorities of the Real Audiencia of Quito. The short-lived autonomy of Quito ends, but the viceroy of New Granada, Pedro Messía de la Cerda, accepts the demands to abolish the new taxes on alcoholic beverages. (September 1, 1766)

== 1770s ==
=== Events in the Viceroyalty of the Río de la Plata ===
- Events in the Kingdom of Buenos Aires
  - The Viceroyalty of the Río de la Plata is established out of territories from the Viceroyalty of Perú. This is done in order to encourage further economic development of the territories of Buenos Aires, Paraguay, Banda Oriental and Upper Peru. This is done as part of the Bourbon Reforms enacted by the Spanish Monarchy. Its first viceroy, Pedro de Cevallos, takes office on October 15, 1777.

== 1780s ==
=== Events in the Viceroyalty of New Granada ===
- Events in the New Kingdom of Granada
  - The Revolt of the Comuneros begins in the city of Socorro. In order to finance wars elsewhere in the New World, such as the American Revolutionary War, and the defense of key colonial ports from British attacks, the Spanish Crown imposes new taxes and restrictions on the production of tobacco and aguardiente. On March 16, 1781, Manuela Beltrán tears down the royal edict announcing the new taxes issued by the King. This causes various Criollo and Mestizo colonists to initiate a series of revolts against the viceregal authorities, known as the Revolt of the Comuneros. They march under the slogan "Long live the King, down with bad governance!". (March 16, 1781)

=== Events in British West Florida ===
- Siege of Pensacola, part of the Gulf Coast Campaign of the American Revolutionary War. Spanish colonial and metropolitan forces, with the help of French troops, fight against the British and their German allies from the County of Waldeck, to capture the city of Pensacola. Bernardo de Gálvez, governor of Louisiana, commands the Spanish troops that defeat the British and capture West Florida. Francisco de Miranda, founding father of Venezuela, was part of the Spanish colonial troops that fought in the battle. Moreover, the Spanish Crown would impose more taxes upon its American territories in order to finance the Siege of Pensacola and other campaigns and wars, as part of the Bourbon Reforms. (March 9 – May 8, 1781)

== 1790s ==
=== Events in the Viceroyalty of New Granada ===
- Events in the Kingdom of Venezuela
  - The Conspiracy of Gual and España takes places in Venezuela. A conspiracy, led by Manuel Gual and José María España, begins in La Guaira with the objective of declaring independence for Venezuela from Spain. The conspirators are captured by the Spanish authorities and Manuel Gual is executed in Caracas, while José María España is exiled to Trinidad. Manuel Cortés Campomanes also participates in the conspiracy. (July 13, 1797 – May 8, 1799)

== 1806 ==
=== Events in the United States of America ===
- Francisco de Miranda visits Washington, D.C. and holds a private meeting with President Thomas Jefferson and Secretary of State James Madison, in order to encourage the United States to support an invasion of Venezuela to make it independent of the Spanish Empire. The Neutrality Act of 1794 prevents the United States to support Miranda on that occasion. However, he gathers various volunteers, among them David G. Burnet, future president of the Republic of Texas, to conduct a military operation to liberate Venezuela. He sets sail on a ship called Leander on February 2, 1806.

== 1808 ==
=== Events in the Kingdom of Spain ===
- The Mutiny of Aranjuez takes place in this city. King Charles IV of Spain is forced to abdicate in favour of the Prince of Asturias, his son. Ferdinand VII becomes king of Spain. (March 17–19)
- Antonio Pascual de Borbón becomes regent of Spain as the President of the Supreme Government Junta of Spain, due to the absence of king Ferdinand VII. His regency would last until May 4, 1808. (April 10, 1808)
- Joachim Murat becomes regent of Spain, after being appointed to that position by Napoleon, whose armies had conquered large areas of Spain. (May 4, 1808)
- The Abdications of Bayonne take place. Napoleon forces the former king Charles IV and king Ferdinand VII to abdicate in favour of him. In theory, Napoleon became the new king of Spain. (May 7, 1808)
- Napoleon names his brother, Joseph Bonaparte, as king of Spain. The Kingdom of Spain becomes a satellite state of the French Empire under Napoleon. (June 6)

=== Events in the Viceroyalty of the Río de la Plata ===
- Events in the Kingdom of Buenos Aires
  - The Government Junta of Montevideo is established after the news of Napoleon's invasion of Spain reach the Banda Oriental. The Junta is peacefully disbanded by Baltasar Hidalgo de Cisneros, the new viceroy of the Río de la Plata. (September 21)

=== Events in the Viceroyalty of New Spain ===
- Events in the Spanish Caribbean Islands
  - Gabriel de Yermo, a wealthy landowner in New Spain, conducts a popular coup against José de Iturrigaray, viceroy of New Spain. The Real Audiencia appoints Pedro de Garibay as the new viceroy of New Spain. (September 15)
  - Some criollo colonists in Havana, among them Francisco de Arango y Parreño, suggest the creation of an autonomous government junta in Cuba. Their proposal is rejected and no change of government happens in Cuba. (September 26 and 27)

== 1809 ==
=== Events in the Viceroyalty of New Granada ===
- Events in the Kingdom of Quito
  - Independence Day of Ecuador (Quito Revolution (1809-1812): On August 10, 1809, an autonomist Governing Junta for the Kingdom of Quito is declared in the city of Quito. (August 10, 1809)

=== Events in the Kingdom of Spain ===
- British forces led by Sir Arthur Wellesley join the Peninsular War, supporting the Spanish resistance.

== 1810 ==
1810 in the Wars of Independence in New Granada (Colombia, Venezuela, Ecuador and Panama)

← Prelude 1811 →
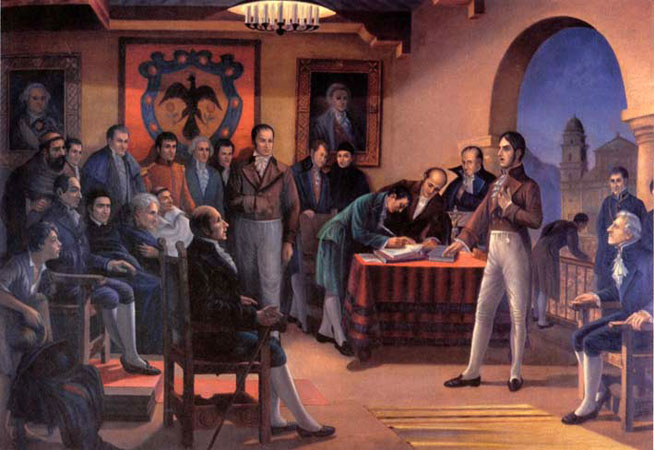
- Signing of the creation of the Supreme Junta of Santa Fe in New Granada on July 20, 1810, a date celebrated as the Colombian Declaration of Independence. 1925 painting by Coriolano Leudo.
Location	South America, Central America, Caribbean

Belligerents
Patriots: Supreme Junta of Santa Fe; Supreme Junta of Caracas; Supreme Junta of Quito	Ferdinandists: Supreme Junta of Spain and the Indies; Regency Council of Spain and the Indies	Bonapartists: Kingdom of Spain; French Empire

=== Events in the Viceroyalty of New Granada ===
- Events in the New Kingdom of Granada
  - May, 1810
    - The cabildo (City Council) of Cartagena de Indias, which was the capital of the colonial Province of Cartagena, creates an autonomous government junta to rule the province and its territorial jurisdiction in the name of Ferdinand VII, who was captured by Napoleon. The colonial governor of the province, Francisco de Montes, participates and authorizes the creation of this autonomist junta. This junta of Cartagena is initially created in a temporal capacity, due to the grave state of war that Spain faced back in Europe. Delegates of the cities and towns of Mompox, Simití, San Benito Abad and Tolú are invited to join the junta. (May 22, 1810)
  - June, 1810
    - The Junta of Cartagena approves a motion to remove Francisco Montes, originally the colonial governor of the Province of Cartagena, from his office as governor. He was accused of not obeying the decisions of the junta and of still acting as the sole governor of the province, without the approval of the newly established autonomist government junta. Antonio Villavicencio, the royal representative (comisionado regio) sent by the Regency Council of Spain and the Indies was forced to accept the removal of the colonial governor, in order to avoid the outbreak of a revolt in Cartagena. (June 14, 1810)
    - The Junta of Cartagena approves a motion to create two new militia regiments, one for whites and one for mixed-race individuals, to defend the newly established autonomist government of the Province of Cartagena. (June 19, 1810)
  - July, 1810
    - The Regency Council of Spain and the Indies begins a trial of residence (juicio de residencia) towards Antonio José Amar y Borbón, viceroy of New Granada, a normal procedure made towards the end of the term of a viceroy in the Spanish Empire, meaning that his position as viceroy was about to be terminated. (July 4, 1810)
    - The cabildo (City Council) of Pamplona, which was the capital of the colonial Province of Pamplona, creates an autonomous government junta to rule the province and its territorial jurisdiction in the name of Ferdinand VII, who was captured by Napoleon. The colonial governor of the Province of Pamplona, Juan Bastús, was sent to prison. (July 4, 1810)
    - A popular riot in the city of Socorro forces the colonial governor of the Province of Socorro, José Valdés Posada, to step down from his office as governor. (July 10, 1810)
    - The cabildo (City Council) of Socorro, which was the capital of the colonial Province of Socorro, creates an autonomous government junta to rule the province and its territorial jurisdiction in the name of Ferdinand VII, who was captured by Napoleon. The cities of Vélez and Girón are invited to send representatives to this newly established autonomist provincial junta. (July 11, 1810)
    - The cabildo (City Council) of Santa Fe, which was the capital of the Viceroyalty of New Granada and of its Real Audiencia, creates an autonomous government junta to rule all the colonial provinces that had historically been under the jurisdiction of the Real Audiencia of Santa Fe. The junta claimed to rule those territories in the name of king Ferdinand VII, who was captured by Napoleon. However, the viceroy appointed by said monarch, Antonio José Amar y Borbón, is removed from his office by the members of the junta and is instead appointed as the president of the new autonomist government in the capital of New Granada. This event is traditionally celebrated in Colombia as Independence Day. (July 20, 1810)
    - The cabildo (City Council) of Tunja, which was the capital of the colonial Province of Tunja, creates an autonomous government junta to rule the province and its territorial jurisdiction in the name of Ferdinand VII, who was captured by Napoleon. The cities of Villa de Leyva and Muzo are invited to send representatives to this newly established autonomist provincial junta, but they decline attendance to this junta in Tunja. (July 26, 1810)
    - The cabildo (City Council) of Neiva, which was the capital of the colonial Province of Neiva, creates an autonomous government junta to rule the province and its territorial jurisdiction in the name of Ferdinand VII, who was captured by Napoleon. The colonial governor of Neiva, Anastasio Ladrón de Guevara, is removed from his office as governor and sent to prison, following a motion proposed by the leader of the cabildo (city council) of the city. The cities of Timaná, La Plata and Purificación are also invited to join this junta. (July 27, 1810)
    - The cabildo (City Council) of San Juan de Girón, which was part of the colonial Province of Socorro, creates an autonomous government junta to rule the city and its territorial jurisdiction in the name of Ferdinand VII, who was captured by Napoleon. The city of Bucaramanga was also invited to join this junta. They reject the authority of the Junta of Socorro, and claim to have the right of establishing their own autonomous government junta separate from the junta created in the capital city of the colonial province they historically belonged to. (July 30, 1810)
    - The Junta of Pamplona receives an invitation, through the members of the cabildo (city council) of San Gil, to elect a representative from the Province of Pamplona to be sent to Santa Fe to represent them in a proposed General Congress of New Granada that aimed to include all the former colonial provinces of the New Kingdom of Granada. (July 31, 1810)
  - August, 1810
    - Writing from Havana, Cuba, the former royalist governor of the Province of Cartagena, Francisco Montes, sends a letter to Antonio José Amar y Borbón, viceroy of New Granada until July 20, 1810, expressing his readiness to recapture Cartagena from the autonomous junta that had formed in the city on May 22, 1810. (August 1, 1810)
    - News of the creation of the Supreme Junta of New Granada in Santa Fe, created on July 20, 1810, reach the city of Popayán. (August 5, 1810)
    - The cabildo (City Council) of Santa Marta, which was the capital of the colonial Province of Santa Marta, creates an autonomous government junta to rule the province and its territorial jurisdiction in the name of Ferdinand VII, who was captured by Napoleon. The colonial governor of Santa Marta, Víctor de Salcedo y Somodevilla, is appointed as the president of this newly formed autonomist junta. The Junta of Santa Marta included representatives from the cities of Ocaña, Tenerife and Valledupar, as well as its capital, Santa Marta. (August 10–11, 1810)
    - The cabildo (City Council) of Popayán, which was the capital of the colonial Province of Popayán, creates a temporary autonomous government junta to rule the province and its territorial jurisdiction in the name of Ferdinand VII, who was captured by Napoleon. The creation of the junta was originally proposed and supported by Miguel Tacón, the colonial governor of the province and Carlos de Montúfar, the royal representative (comisionado regio) sent by the Regency Council of Spain and the Indies. Miguel Tacón is appointed as the president of this new junta and the cities of Cali, Buga, Cartago, Toro and Anserma are invited to join the junta. (August 11, 1810)
    - News reach Cartagena of the creation of a Supreme Government Junta in Santa Fe that pretended to rule over all the provinces of New Granada. Because of this, the Junta of Cartagena passes a motion to declare itself to no longer be a temporal government but definitive and absolute government of the Province of Cartagena, without recognizing the authority of the Junta of Santa Fe over the territories of the colonial Province of Cartagena. (August 13, 1810)
    - The autonomist Provincial Government Junta of the Province of Socorro holds its first definitive meeting with the delegates of the cities of Socorro, Girón and Vélez, after having met only in a temporal capacity until the arrival in Socorro, the provincial capital, of the delegates of the other two cities of the province. (August 15, 1810)
    - The cabildo (City Council) of Timaná, which was part of the colonial Province of Neiva, creates an autonomous government junta to rule the city and its territorial jurisdiction in the name of Ferdinand VII, who was captured by Napoleon. They reject the authority of the Junta of Neiva, and claim to have the right of establishing their own autonomous government junta separate from the junta created in the capital city of the colonial province they historically belonged to. (August 27, 1810)
    - A Congress is held with representatives of the cabildos (city councils) of the cities and towns of the Province of Antioquia. Delegates from Santa Fe de Antioquia, Medellín, Rionegro and Marinilla attended the Congress. This Congress decides to create the Provincial Junta of Antioquia with delegates from previously mentioned cities and towns. (August 30–September 10, 1810)
  - September, 1810
    - The cabildo (city council) of Quibdó, which was the capital of the colonial Province of Chocó, creates an autonomous government junta to rule the province and its territorial jurisdiction in the name of Ferdinand VII, who was captured by Napoleon. The colonial governor of Chocó, Juan Aguirre, voluntarily resigns from his office. The new Junta of Quibdó expresses its willingness to submit to the authority of the Supreme Junta of New Granada in Santa Fe (September 1, 1810)
    - After having been officially created on August 27, 1810, the Junta of Timaná finally convenes in the town of Garzón. They expressed their willingness to negotiate some form of union with the Supreme Junta of Santa Fe. (September 5, 1810)
    - The town Soatá, which was part of the colonial Province of Tunja, creates an autonomous government junta to rule the town and its territorial jurisdiction in the name of Ferdinand VII, who was captured by Napoleon. They reject the authority of the Junta of Tunja, and claim to have the right of establishing their own autonomous government. (September 7, 1810)
    - The cabildo (city council) of Pore, which was the capital of the colonial Province of Casanare, creates an autonomous government junta to rule the province and its territorial jurisdiction in the name of Ferdinand VII, who was captured by Napoleon. The cities and towns of Chire, Santiago de las Atalayas and Arauca decline to join this new provincial junta. (September 13, 1810)
    - The cabildo (city council) of Nóvita, which was part of the colonial Province of Chocó, creates an autonomous government junta to rule the city and its territorial jurisdiction in the name of Ferdinand VII, who was captured by Napoleon. They reject the authority of the Junta of Quibdó, and claim to have the right of establishing their own autonomous government junta. (September 27, 1810)
  - October, 1810
    - The town of Arauca decides to join the Junta of Pore and recognize them as the new autonomous government of the Province of Casanare. (October 14, 1810)
    - The town of Chire decides to join the Junta of Pore and recognize them as the new autonomous government of the Province of Casanare. (October 18, 1810)
    - The Regency Council of Spain and the Indies appoints colonel Antonio de Laris as governor of Antioquia. However, he was not able to assume office, as he could not travel to the New World. (October 19, 1810)
  - November, 1810
    - The Junta of Popayán decides to disband itself after considering that forming an autonomous government junta to rule the Province of Popayán was a revolutionary act against the monarchy and the Catholic Church. Miguel Tacón resumed his complete authority as the colonial governor of the province, as it had been before the creation of the autonomous junta of Popayán. (November 2, 1810)
    - The cabildo (city council) of Popayán announces to the people the dissolution of the autonomous junta of the province and the return of the colonial order under governor Miguel Tacón. (November 5, 1810)
    - The Junta of Pore is reorganized in order to incorporate delegates from other cities and towns of the Province of Casanare. The Junta of Pore adopts the government organization of the Junta of Socorro. (November 26, 1810)
  - December, 1810
    - The Supreme Provincial Junta of Cartagena determines that the number of delegates present in the junta should be elected on a representative manner, based on the population of the districts that make up the Province of Cartagena. (December 10, 1810)
    - Considering that only the cabildo (city council) of Tunja accepted the authority of the Junta of Tunja that was established on July 26, 1810, while the other cities of the Province of Tunja rejected it, a new junta is formed to represent the whole province and to elect a representative to the General Congress of New Granada. This new junta received the name of Superior Government Junta of Tunja, and replaced the previously formed one. (December 18, 1810)
    - The Junta of Neiva, with representatives from the cities of Neiva, Timaná, La Plata and Purificación, elect the representative from the Province of Neiva to the General Congress of New Granada. They elected Manuel Campos Cote as their representative for said Congress. (December 22, 1810)
    - A popular movement against the Junta of Santa Marta emerges, leading to the reorganization of the junta and the expulsion of some of its members. (December 22, 1810)
- Events in the Kingdom of Venezuela
  - Patriots Juan Germán Roscio and Francisco Javier Ustáriz create the Patriotic Society for Agriculture and Economy in Caracas. (August 14, 1810)
  - The Supreme Junta of Caracas declares freedom of trade, suppressed tariffs on exports, abolished Native American tributes and prohibited the introduction of new slaves into the territories of Venezuela. (August 14, 1810)
  - The cabildo (City Council) of Mérida, which was part of the colonial Province of Maracaibo, creates an autonomous government junta to rule the city and its territorial jurisdiction in the name of Ferdinand VII, who was captured by Napoleon. (September 18, 1810)
  - The cabildo (City Council) of Trujillo, which was part of the colonial Province of Maracaibo, creates an autonomous government junta to rule the city and its territorial jurisdiction in the name of Ferdinand VII, who was captured by Napoleon. (October 9, 1810)
  - The cabildo (City Council) of La Grita, which was part of the colonial Province of Maracaibo, creates an autonomous government junta to rule the city and its territorial jurisdiction in the name of Ferdinand VII, who was captured by Napoleon. (October 11, 1810)
  - The cabildo (City Council) of Bailadores, which was part of the colonial Province of Maracaibo, creates an autonomous government junta to rule the city and its territorial jurisdiction in the name of Ferdinand VII, who was captured by Napoleon. (October 14, 1810)
  - José Félix Ribas attempts a coup against the Supreme Junta of Caracas, but fails to do so. He is exiled to Jamaica because of this. (October 21, 1810)
  - The cabildo (City Council) of San Cristóbal, which was part of the colonial Province of Maracaibo, creates an autonomous government junta to rule the city and its territorial jurisdiction in the name of Ferdinand VII, who was captured by Napoleon. (October 21, 1810)
  - The cabildo (City Council) of San Antonio del Táchira, which was part of the colonial Province of Maracaibo, creates an autonomous government junta to rule the city and its territorial jurisdiction in the name of Ferdinand VII, who was captured by Napoleon. (October 21, 1810)
  - Battle of Coro: The royalists of the Kingdom of Venezuela, commanded by José Ceballos, defeat the patriots of the Supreme Junta of Caracas, commanded by Francisco Toro. The battle ends with the retreat of the patriot forces. Patriot forces are estimated to be around 2000 for this battle, while royalist forces are estimated to be around 1700. (November 28, 1810)
  - Battle of Sabaneta de Coro: The patriots of the Supreme Junta of Caracas, commanded by Francisco Toro, defeat the royalists of the Kingdom of Venezuela, commanded by Fernando Miyares. The battle ends with the retreat of the royalist forces. Patriot forces are estimated to be around 4000 for this battle, while royalist forces are estimated to be around 800. (November 30, 1810)
  - Simón Bolívar returns to Caracas from London and informs the Supreme Junta of Caracas about his diplomatic mission in the United Kingdom. (December 7, 1810)
  - Martín Tobar Aponte, then president of the Supreme Junta of Caracas, appoints the Chilean José Cortés Madarriaga, as the representative of Venezuela to negotiate and agreement with the provinces of New Granada. (December 10, 1810)
- Events in the Kingdom of Quito
  - Juan de Dios Morales, born in Antioquia and one of the participants of the movement that created the failed autonomist Junta of Quito of 1809, was executed by royalist forces in the city of Quito. (August 2, 1810)
  - News of the creation of the Supreme Junta of New Granada in Santa Fe, created on July 20, 1810, reach the city of Popayán. (August 5, 1810)
  - The cabildo (City Council) of Popayán, which was the capital of the colonial Province of Popayán, creates an autonomous government junta to rule the province and its territorial jurisdiction in the name of Ferdinand VII, who was captured by Napoleon. The creation of the junta was originally proposed and supported by Miguel Tacón, the colonial governor of the province and Carlos de Montúfar, the royal representative (comisionado regio) sent by the Regency Council of Spain and the Indies. Miguel Tacón is appointed as the president of this new junta and the cities of Cali, Buga, Cartago, Toro and Anserma are invited to join the junta. (August 11, 1810)
  - Carlos de Montúfar arrives in Quito as comisionado regio (or representative of the king), sent under the authority of the Supreme Central Junta of Spain, which claimed to rule the empire representing the captured monarch Ferdinand VII. (September 9, 1810)
  - An autonomist Government Junta for the Kingdom of Quito is declared and established in the city of Quito to rule the provinces of the Real Audiencia of Quito in the name of Ferdinand VII, who was captured by Napoleon. The movement behind the creation of this junta is headed by Carlos de Montúfar, José de Cuero y Caicedo and Manuel de Urriés, count of Ruiz de Castilla. (September 19, 1810)
  - The Junta of Quito declares itself to be independent from the Supreme Junta of Santa Fe and it declares the Kingdom of Quito to be completely independent from the New Kingdom of Granada. (October 9, 1810)

=== Events in the Viceroyalty of the Río de la Plata ===
- Events in the Kingdom of Buenos Aires
  - Baltasar Hidalgo de Cisneros, viceroy of the Río de la Plata, receives the news of the occupation of the Spanish city of Seville under French Napoleonic troops. The occupation of Seville by the French began on February 1, 1810. (May 18, 1810)
  - On May 25, 1810, an autonomist Provisional Governing Junta for the Provinces of the Río de la Plata is declared and established in the city of Buenos Aires, an event traditionally referred to as the May Revolution and considered to be the First National Government of Argentina. The viceroy Baltasar Hidalgo de Cisneros is overthrowed by the newly established Junta of Buenos Aires. (May 25, 1810)
  - Juan Bautista Alberdi was born in Tucumán. He wrote a book titled "Bases y puntos de partida para la organización política de la República Argentina" or Fundamentals for the Political Organization of the Argentine Republic. Many of his ideas would be incorporated into the 1853 Constitution of Argentina. (August 29, 1810)
  - After the military achievements of the Supreme Junta of Buenos Aires in the region of Upper Peru, some of the provinces of this region express their support towards the autonomist junta of Buenos Aires. (November 19, 1810)
- Events in the Kingdom of Charcas (Upper Peru)
  - After Baltasar Hidalgo de Cisneros, the viceroy of the Río de la Plata, is overthrowed by the creation of the Junta of Buenos Aires on May 25, 1810, the provinces of Upper Peru, which belonged to the Viceroyalty of the Río de la Plata, decide to join the Viceroyalty of Peru and swear allegiance to its viceroy: José Fernando de Abascal y Souza. (June 20, 1810)
  - After the military achievements of the Supreme Junta of Buenos Aires in the region of Upper Peru, some of the provinces of this region express their support towards the autonomist junta of Buenos Aires. (November 19, 1810)

=== Events in the Viceroyalty of Perú ===
- Events in the Kingdom of Chile
  - An autonomist Government Junta for the Kingdom of Chile is declared and established in the city of Santiago de Chile to rule the provinces of the Captaincy General of Chile in the name of Ferdinand VII, who was captured by Napoleon. The Chilean patriots are politically divided into two sides, one headed by Bernardo O'Higgins and another one headed by José Miguel Carrera. (September 18, 1810)

=== Events in the Viceroyalty of New Spain ===
- Events in the Kingdom of Mexico
  - Antonio López de Santa Anna joins the royalist battalion in Veracruz. (July 6, 1810)
  - Roman Catholic priest Miguel Hidalgo y Costilla gives a speech that would motivate the people of the town of Dolores to take up arms against the Spanish Monarchy. This event is traditionally known as the Cry of Dolores (or Grito de Dolores, in Spanish). (September 16, 1810)
  - Miguel Hidalgo y Costilla declares slavery to be abolished in Mexico. (October 19, 1810)
- Events in the Spanish Caribbean Islands
  - Writing from Havana, Cuba, the former royalist governor of the Province of Cartagena, Francisco Montes, sends a letter to Antonio José Amar y Borbón, viceroy of New Granada until July 20, 1810, expressing his readiness to recapture Cartagena from the autonomous junta that had formed in the city on May 22, 1810. (August 1, 1810)

=== Events in the Kingdom of Spain ===
- The city of Seville is occupied by the Napoleonic troops of the First French Empire. (February 1, 1810)
- The Regency Council of Spain and the Indies begins a trial of residence (juicio de residencia) towards Antonio José Amar y Borbón, viceroy of New Granada, a normal procedure made towards the end of the term of a viceroy in the Spanish Empire, meaning that his position as viceroy was about to be terminated. (July 4, 1810)
- The members of the Cortes of Spain gather in the island of León, in the Bay of Cádiz, to install the Regency Council of Spain and the Indies in the city of Cádiz, after fleeing from the city of Ocaña due to the advance of the French troops in central Spain. (September 24, 1810)
- The Regency Council of Spain and the Indies appoints colonel Antonio de Laris as governor of Antioquia. However, he was not able to assume office, as he could not travel to the New World. (October 19, 1810)

== 1811 ==
=== Events in the Viceroyalty of New Granada ===
- Events in the New Kingdom of Granada
  - Francisco de Miranda sends a letter to the Supreme Junta of Santa Fe proposing the union of the Supreme Juntas of Venezuela and of New Granada into a single nation. (January 22, 1811)
  - The town of Santiago de las Atalayas decides to join the Junta of Pore and recognize them as the new autonomous government of the Province of Casanare. (February 11, 1811)
  - Benito Pérez de Valdelomar, former governor of Yucatán, and newly appointed as viceroy of New Granada by the Regency Council of Spain and the Indies, exercises his authority from Panamá. He sends a delegation headed by Pablo Arosemena to Jamaica in order to convince the British colony there to stop supporting the Spanish American patriots in the conflict. (February 20, 1811)
  - The town of Labranzagrande decides to join the Junta of Pore and recognize them as the new autonomous government of the Province of Casanare. (March 13, 1811)
  - The Real Audiencia of New Granada, which used to be based in Santa Fe, was reestablished in Panama City by royalist authorities fleeing from Santa Fe after an autonomist junta was formed there on July 20, 1810. New royalist officials appointed from Spain by the Regency Council of Spain and the Indies also joined the new colonial government of New Granada in Panama City. (April 9, 1811)
- Events in the Kingdom of Venezuela
  - Francisco de Miranda sends a letter to the Supreme Junta of Santa Fe proposing the union of the Supreme Juntas of Venezuela and of New Granada into a single nation. (January 22, 1811)
  - The First General Congress of Venezuela is created in Caracas, invitations to the Congress are sent to the provinces of Caracas, Barinas, Cumaná, Barcelona, Margarita, Mérida and Trujillo, which had previously formed autonomist juntas to rule each province separately. The Venezuelan provinces of Guayana. Maracaibo and Coro did not join the Congress and remained loyal to the Regency Council of Spain and the Indies. (February 20, 1811)
  - Battle of Cumaná Castle: The royalists of the Kingdom of Venezuela, commanded by Salvador del Hoyo, defeat the patriots of the Supreme Junta of Caracas, commanded by Vicente Sucre. The battle ends with a capitulation by the patriot side. Patriot forces are estimated to be around 2000 for this battle, while royalist forces are estimated to be around 350. (March 6, 1811)
  - The provinces of Cumaná and Barcelona, together with their newly established government juntas, join the First General Congress of Venezuela. (April 27, 1811)
  - The Province of Margarita, together with its newly established government junta, joins the First General Congress of Venezuela. (May 4, 1811)
  - The Province of Barinas, together with its newly established government junta, joins the First General Congress of Venezuela. (May 5, 1811)
  - The royalist governor of the Province of Maracaibo, Fernando Miyares, captures the delegates from the Junta of Caracas sent to the province to invite them to join the First General Congress of Venezuela. They are exiled to Puerto Rico and Maracaibo declines joining the Congress. (May 18, 1811)
  - Manuel Cortés Campomanes, a Spanish Peninsular revolutionary, formally requests to be given Venezuelan citizenship. (May 21, 1811)
  - The Province of Mérida, together with its newly established government junta, joins the First General Congress of Venezuela. (September 16, 1811)
  - The Province of Trujillo, together with its newly established government junta, joins the First General Congress of Venezuela. (October 9, 1811)
- Events in the Kingdom of Quito
  - Troops from the Junta of Quito, under the leadership of Carlos de Montúfar, defeat the troops of Miguel Tacón, the royalist governor of Popayán, near the city of Pasto, in the town of Cuaspud. The Junta of Quito captures the city of Pasto. (February 20, 1811)

=== Events in the Viceroyalty of the Río de la Plata ===
- Events in the Kingdom of Buenos Aires
  - Battle of Paraguarí: The Paraguayans defeat an army led by Manuel Belgrano, which was sent by the Supreme Junta of Buenos Aires to incorporate the colonial Province of Paraguay into its government. (January 19, 1811)
  - Domingo Faustino Sarmiento is born in San Juan de la Frontera, future president of Argentina from 1868 to 1874. (February 15, 1811)
  - Various Criollo revolutionaries from Montevideo, led by Venancio Benavides and Pedro José Viera, decide to support the autonomist movements began by the Supreme Junta of Buenos Aires. An armed rebellion begins in the proximities of the Asencio River. This event is traditionally known in Uruguay as the Cry of Asencio (or Grito de Asencio in Spanish). (February 28, 1811)
  - Mariano Moreno, secretary of the Supreme Junta of Buenos Aires, dies at the sea. He was the founder of the first Public Library of Buenos Aires and defended free commerce through various publications and newspapers that he authored in Buenos Aires. (March 4, 1811)
  - Paraguayan royalist forces defeat the troops of Manuel Belgrano from the Supreme Junta of Buenos Aires in the Battle of Tacuarí. (March 8, 1811)
  - The Supreme Junta of Buenos Aires grants the rank of lieutenant colonel to the uruguayan José Gervasio Artigas. (March 9, 1811)
  - The Supreme Junta of Buenos Aires expels all single male Peninsular Spaniards from the city of Córdoba. (March 21, 1811)
  - The Supreme Junta of Buenos Aires decrees freedom of the press in the territories it claims to control. (April 20, 1811)
  - The colonial Province of Paraguay declares autonomy both from the Regency Council of Spain and the Indies as well as from the Supreme Junta of Buenos Aires by creating their own Government Junta of Paraguay. This event is traditionally seen as a Declaration of Independence in modern-day Paraguay. Gaspar Rodríguez de Francia emerges as an important leader of this Paraguayan autonomist movement. (May 16, 1811)
  - Battle of Las Piedras: José Gervasio Artigas, commanding a force of Uruguayan patriots loyal to the Supreme Junta of Buenos Aires, defeats the Spanish forces of the Viceroyalty of the Río de la Plata near Montevideo and begins a siege of the city. (May 18, 1811)
  - Land forces from the Supreme Junta of Buenos Aires arrive to support the patriots in the Siege of Montevideo. They are commanded by General José Rondeau. (June 1, 1811)
  - A Paraguayan Congress is held, presided by Gaspar Rodríguez de Francia. (June 17, 1811)

=== Events in the Viceroyalty of Perú ===
- Events in the Kingdom of Chile
  - The first National Congress of Chile is inaugurated, with Juan Antonio Ovalle as its president. (February 4, 1811)
  - Mateo del Toro Zambrano, count of La Conquista, dies in Santiago de Chile. He was the last colonial governor of Chile before the events of September 18, 1810, that created an autonomist junta to rule Chile. (February 27, 1811)
  - The Junta of Chile declares that Indigenous peoples have the same rights as the Criollo and Mestizo colonists of the region. (February 28, 1811)

=== Events in the Viceroyalty of New Spain ===
- Events in the Kingdom of Mexico
  - José María Morelos takes over the city of Tixtla. (May 26, 1811)

== 1812 ==
- Spain enacts a Constitution. First Spanish expeditionaries arrive to Americas on January to support the Royalists.
- The First Republic is created in Venezuela

== 1813 ==
- Simón Bolívar gathers an army to free Venezuela. He signs the Decree of War to the Death and triumphantly enters Caracas
- Mexico abolishes slavery privileges and indigenous tribute, and later declares independence

== 1814 ==
- Ferdinand VII returns to Spain. Absolutism is restored; the 1812 Constitution is repealed and the Cortes dissolved.
- Venezuela creates the short-lived Second Republic; Bolívar is defeated and moves to New Granada
- Bolívar conquers Bogotá
- Mexico enacts a Constitution

== 1815 ==
- A Spanish Army of overseas sails from Cádiz led by Pablo Morillo, in order to retake the former colonies in South America.
- Simón Bolívar moves to Jamaica

== 1816 ==
=== Events in the former Viceroyalty of the Río de la Plata ===
- Independence Day of Argentina: On July 9, 1816, the Congress of Tucumán gathered representatives from the provinces of the former Viceroyalty of the Río de la Plata and passed the Declaration of Independence of the United Provinces of South America, which would later be known as the United Provinces of the Río de la Plata. From this moment, Argentina would break all political ties with the Kingdom of Spain. (July 9, 1816)

== 1817 ==
=== Events in the Viceroyalty of New Granada ===
- Events in the New Kingdom of Granada
  - Policarpa Salavarrieta, also known as "La Pola", is executed by Loyalist forces in the Plaza Mayor of Santa Fe. She was one of the most important spies during the Wars of Independence in New Granada. (November 14, 1817)

=== Events in the Viceroyalty of Perú ===
- Events in the Kingdom of Chile
  - José de San Martín leads the Crossing of the Andes, defeats the Chilean royalists at the Battle of Chacabuco, and triumphantly enters Santiago de Chile. (February 12, 1817)

== 1818 ==
- Simón Bolívar organizes a third Venezuelan republic in Angostura and calls for a congress. Bolivar's campaign to take Caracas is defeated, and he returns to the line of the Orinoco river.
- The patriotic triumph at the Battle of Maipú guarantees the independence of Chile

== 1819 ==
- Bolívar defeats the royalists at the Battle of Boyacá. New Granada is liberated
- The Congress of Angostura creates Gran Colombia; Bolívar is elected its president.

== 1820 ==
=== Events in the former Viceroyalty of the Río de la Plata ===
- Manuel Belgrano, creator of the flag of Argentina, dies in the city of Buenos Aires. Date currently commemorated in Argentina as the National Flag Day. (June 20, 1820).

== 1821 ==
=== Events in the former Viceroyalty of New Granada ===
- The triumph of Bolívar at Carabobo guarantees the independence of Venezuela

=== Events in the former Viceroyalty of the Río de la Plata ===
- General Martín Miguel de Güemes, who participated in the independence of Argentina, dies in the town of Chamical, Salta, Río de la Plata. Date currently commemorated in Argentina as the Anniversary of the Passing of General Martín Miguel de Güemes. (June 17, 1821)
- Brazil annexes the Banda Oriental to their territories

=== Events in the former Viceroyalty of New Spain ===
- The Spanish Captain-General in Mexico City recognizes Mexico's independence but the royal government in Madrid does not. Mexico forms a constitutional monarchy.

== 1822 ==
=== Events in the former Viceroyalty of New Spain ===
- The United States recognizes the independence of the former Spanish colonies
- Bolívar and San Martin meet at Guayaquil
- San Martin resigns from power in Peru and leaves Lima
- Antonio José de Sucre defeats the royalists at the Battle of Pichincha
- Ecuador joins Gran Colombia
- Agustín de Iturbide is proclaimed Emperor of Mexico, under the name Agustín I

== 1823 ==
- End of siege of Puerto Cabello Fostress (Venezuela)
- A liberal riot in Mexico forces Iturbide to abdicate
- The Federal Republic of Central America is created

== 1824 ==
- Mexico is declared a federal republic and enacts a Constitution
- The Battle of Ayacucho ends the Spanish presence in Peru
- The government of Ramón Freire in Chile, led by Jorge Beauchef, fails to capture Chiloé Archipelago from the Spanish

== 1825 ==
- End of siege of San Juan de Ulúa Fostress (Mexico)
- Royalist Pedro Antonio Olañeta dies in the Battle of Tumusla (Bolivia).

== 1826 ==
- End of siege and surrender of Real Felipe Fortress (Perú)
- Capitulation of Spanish Chiloé Province

== 1827 ==
- Jose Arizabalo, with support of Captaincy General of Puerto Rico, starts the last royalist guerrilla in Venezuela, defeated in 1829.

== 1828 ==
- Mexican Navy under the command of David Porter is defeated in the Caribbean.

== 1829 ==
- The last attempt of Ferdinand VII of Spain to reconquer Spanish America. Isidro Barradas was defeated in the battle of Tampico (Mexico).

== 1830 ==
=== Events in the former Viceroyalty of New Granada ===
- An Assembly of Notables gathers in Quito, representing the Department of Quito, and declares the creation of the State of Ecuador as an autonomous federal state within Colombia. Juan José Flores is elected as the president of this State of Ecuador. (May 13)
- The departments of Guayaquil and Azuay decide to join the newly declared State of Ecuador. (May 19–20)
- Ecuadorian president Juan José Flores convokes a Constituent Assembly in Quito in order to draft a constitution for the newly declared State of Ecuador. (August 14)
- The 1830 Constitution of the State of Ecuador is promulgated, thus officially creating an Ecuadorian state separate from Colombia. However, this Ecuadorian constitution still view Ecuador as part of a wider Colombian nation and left the exact details of its federal status with Colombia open. (September 11)
- The Congress of Valencia decides to separate Venezuela from Colombia. The Congress of Valencia establishes the provisional State of Venezuela as a nation independent from Colombia. (October 14)
- Marshal Antonio José de Sucre is assassinated and liberator Simón Bolívar dies from disease at the end of the year.

=== Events in France ===
- The July Revolution weakens the absolutist Bourbon monarchy of France. Ferdinand VII loses any chance of getting military support from France to strengthen his absolutist rule over Spain and its colonies. (July 26–29)
- Adoption of the Charter of 1830, a new liberal constitution adopted by France, further reducing the chances of French absolutist support towards Ferdinand VII and his absolutist rule in Spain and its colonies. (August 7)

== 1833 ==
=== Events in the Kingdom of Spain ===
- King Ferdinand VII of Spain dies in Madrid. (September 29)

== 1836 ==
=== Events in the Kingdom of Spain ===
- The Congress of Spain issues a decree authorizing the Spanish Government to renounce its territorial and sovereign claims over its domains in continental Americas, by concluding treaties with each of the states of Spanish America. (December 16)

== 1850 ==
=== Events in France ===
- José de San Martín, main leader of the independence of Argentina, Chile, and Perú, dies in the city of Boulogne-sur-Mer. Date currently commemorated in Argentina as General José de San Martín Memorial Day. (August 17)

== See also ==
- Spanish colonization of the Americas
- Spanish American wars of independence
- Junta (Spanish American Independence)

== Bibliography ==
- Higgins, James (2014). The Emancipation of Peru: British Eyewitness Accounts. Online at https://sites.google.com/site/jhemanperu
- Luna, Félix (2003). La independencia argentina y americana (in Spanish). Buenos Aires: Planeta. ISBN 950-49-1110-2.
