= Pisba =

Coordinates: 5°43′N 72°29′W

- Municipality and town
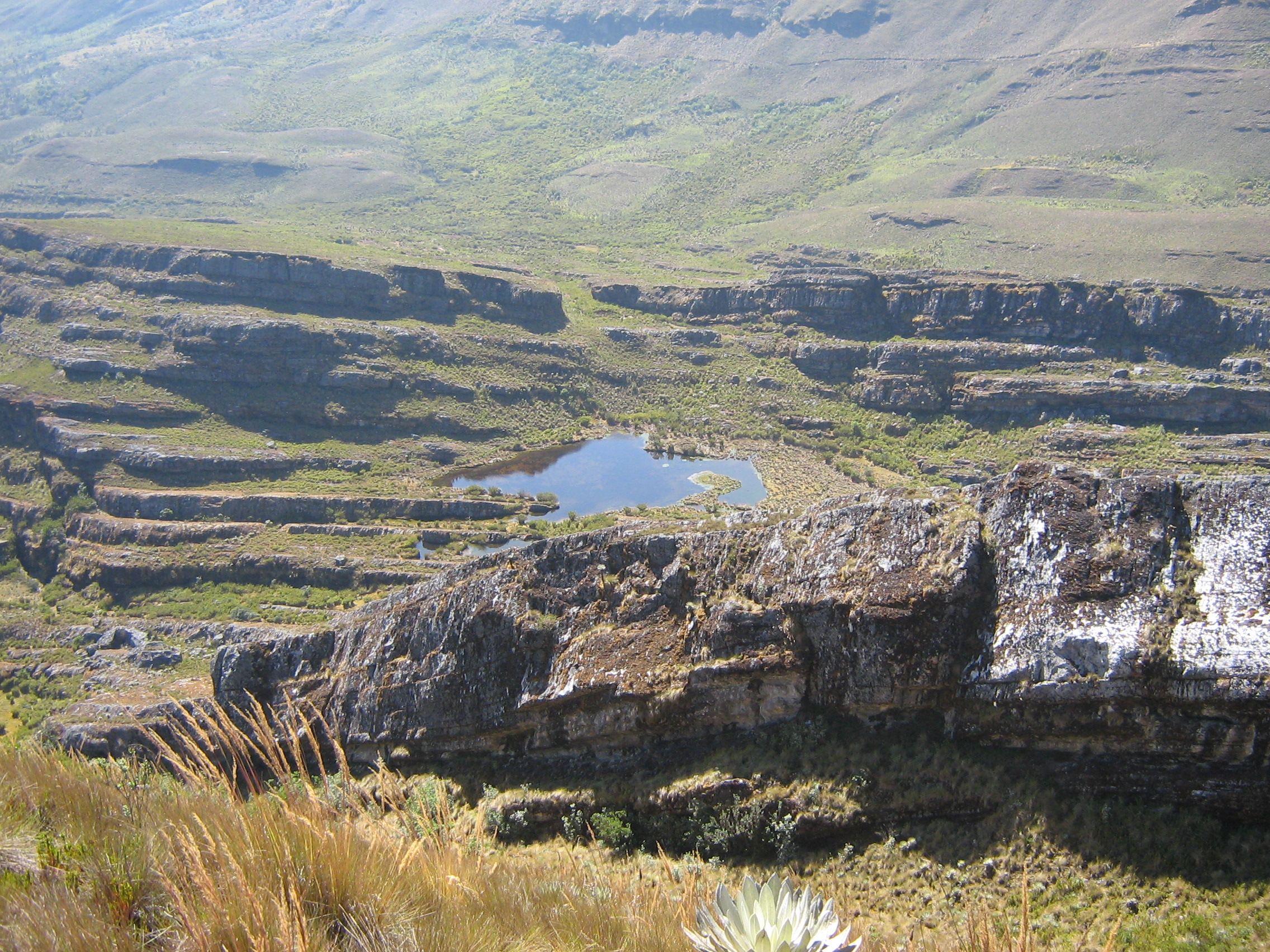
- Lake in Páramo de Pisba

- Flag

- Location of the municipality and town of Pisba in the Boyacá Department of Colombia
- Country: Colombia
- Department: Boyacá Department
- Province: La Libertad Province
- Founded: 3 April 1629
- Founder: Jesuit missionaries

Government
  - Mayor: Wilton Giovani Ruíz Correa (2020-2023)

Area
  - Municipality and town: 469.12 km^{2} (181.13 sq mi)
  - Urban: 30.96 km^{2} (11.95 sq mi)
- Elevation: 2,400–3,500 m (7,900–11,500 ft)

Population (2015)
  - Municipality and town: 1,344
  - Density: 2.865/km^{2} (7.420/sq mi)
  - Urban: 391
- Time zone: UTC-5 (Colombia Standard Time)
- Website: Official website

Pisba (sometimes spelled Pisva) is a town and municipality in Boyacá Department, Colombia, part of the subregion of La Libertad Province. Pisba is situated in the Eastern Ranges of the Colombian Andes at altitudes between 2,400 metres (7,900 ft) and 3,500 metres (11,500 ft). Distance to Sogamoso is 128 kilometres (80 mi) and to Tunja 176 kilometres (109 mi). The municipality borders Paya in the east, Labranzagrande in the south and Mongua in the northwest. The Casanare municipality Támara borders Pisba in the north.

== History ==
Pisba is located in the east of Boyacá and in this area the Muisca inhabiting the Altiplano Cundiboyacense bordered the homelands of the U'wa in the north and the Achagua in the east. The name is derived from the Chibcha language and means "Honourable domain from before". At the arrival of the Spanish, it is said the Muisca worked hard in agriculture, mainly maize, yuca, bananas and predominantly cotton. Pisba was ruled by the iraca of Sugamuxi.

Modern Pisba was founded on April 3, 1629.

== Nature ==
The national park Páramo de Pisba is located close to Pisba and named after it.

== Economy ==
Main economical activities in Pisba are agriculture, silviculture and livestock farming.

== Gallery ==
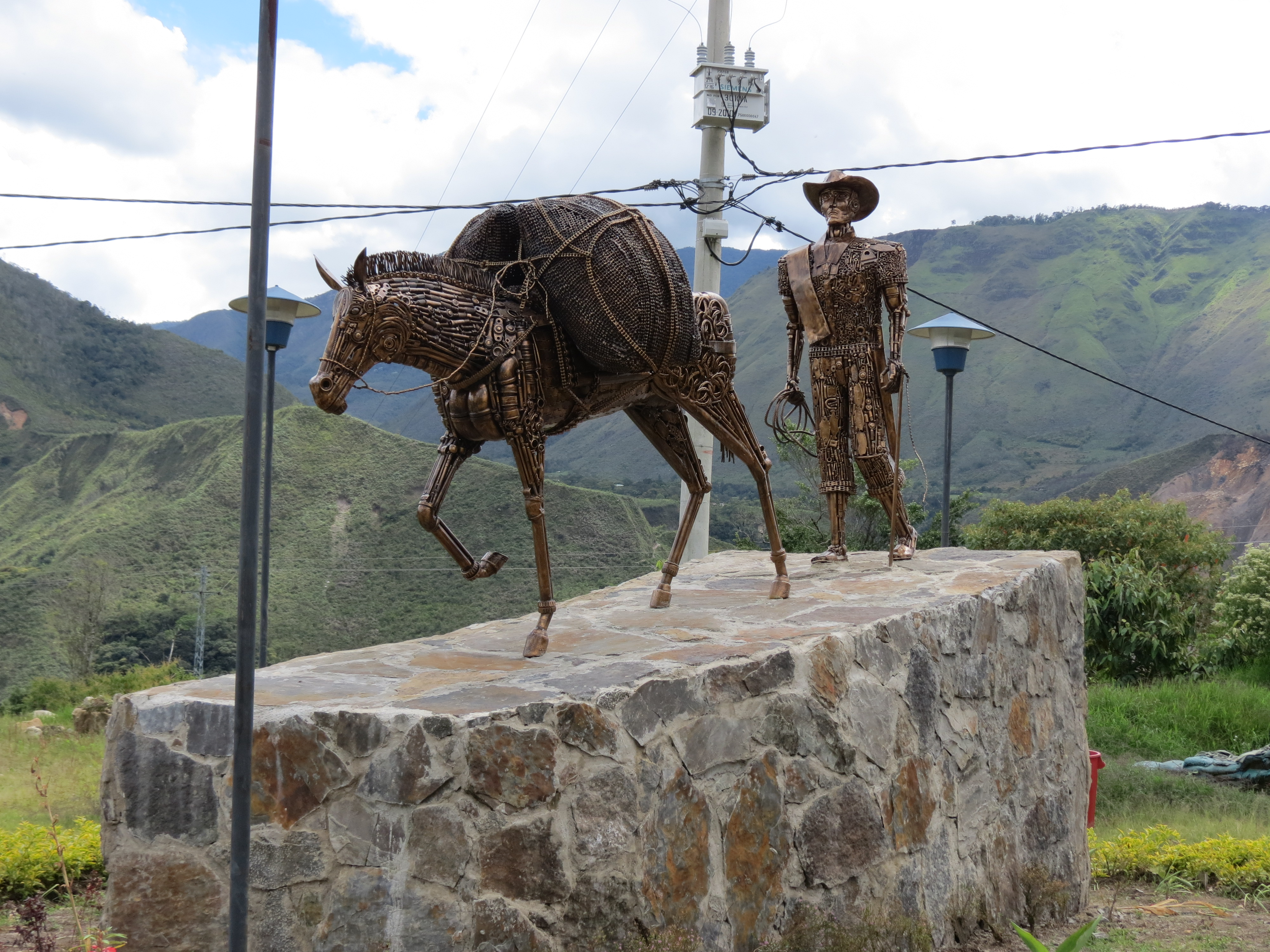
Monument honouring the coffee farmers
