= Open cabildo =

Town-hall style meeting in Hispanic America

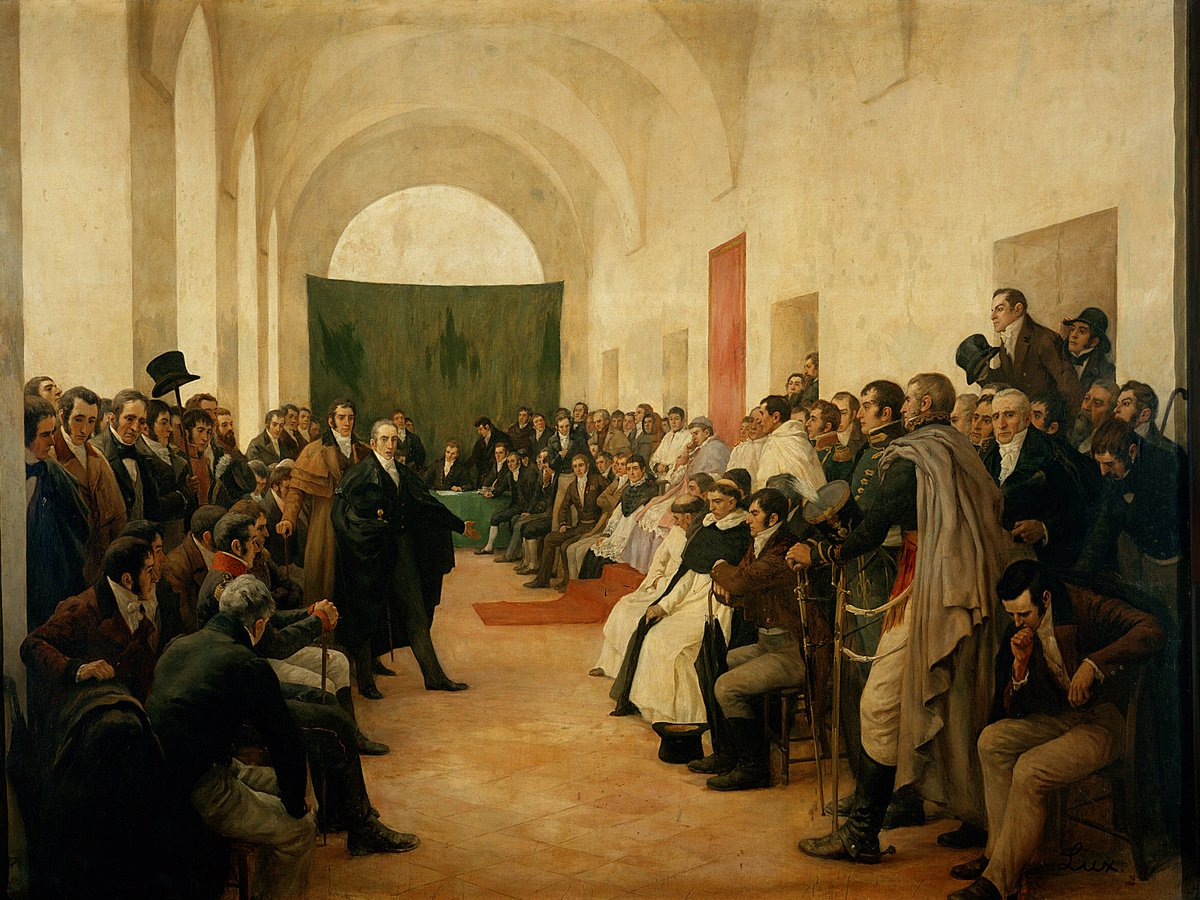
Cabildo abierto del 22 de mayo de 1810 by Pedro Subercaseaux

The Open cabildo (Spanish: "cabildo abierto") was a traditional institution of the Spanish Monarchy in which a municipal council (cabildo) was enlarged by convening local notables to deliberate on matters of particular importance. It had precedents in medieval Spanish law and was used in both Spain and Spanish America. During the political crisis of 1808, open cabildos acquired renewed importance as local communities ("pueblos") innovatively used traditional institutions to address the unprecedented absence of legitimate royal authority ("vacatio regis").

== History ==
=== Colonial period ===
The open cabildo was a special mode of assembly of the inhabitants of Spanish American cities during the colonial period, in cases of emergencies or disasters. Usually, the colonial cities were governed by a cabildo or an ayuntamiento, a municipal council in which most of the officers were appointed by the authorities. In cases of emergency, the cabildo could convene the heads of household (vecinos) or a section/all of the citizenry in an "open" cabildo. Typically located at the main church, square, or a member's house, it could be convened in the absence of legal precedent for mobilizing soldiers, announcing taxes, receiving information and communications, and promulgating emergency laws, among other issues. In La ciudad Indiana (1900) by Juan Agustín García, he characterized the open cabildo as a function of communicating orders by the royal government, rarely formulating policy. William Wheatley Pierson Jr. agreed, claiming authoritative weakness as a general fact whilst strength dependent on circumstantial development. Historians Modesto Chávez Franco and Francisco X. Tapia assert meetings were not frequent, with outliers being Zacatecas in the 16th century and Santiago del Estero in the 18th century.

Their composition varied. Ubiquitous constituents were statesmen and clergy, whilst vecinos' consistent inclusion is indeterminate; generally, their participation increased during the later centuries of the colonial period, however vecinos' delineation correspondingly decreased. It is also ambiguous as to what extent Spaniards, criollos, mestizos, and the indigenous participated.

Early open cabildos demonstrated some elective power. Following Francisco Pizarro's death, Pedro de Valdivia's appointment to Governor of Chile by a series of open cabildos in May 1541. As permitted by Carlos V, Asunción's open cabildo of vecinos elected the governor from 1548 to 1736, when it was revoked due to their participation in the Revolt of the Comuneros. During the 16th century, those in Spain could elect their alcaldes; one in Havana exercised similar power until at least 1553, voting on two candidates; in 1603, the body reformed under the pretense of combatting piracy, which was a common recourse.

At the beginning of the Spanish American wars of independence open cabildos, acting as organs of popular participation, played a decisive role as the way by which revolutionary movements were able to remove the colonial authorities and establish new revolutionary governments. Such event occurred in San Miguel de Tucumán on 21 May 1810, Bogotá 10 July 1810, and Granada, Nicaragua 22 December 1811.

=== Modern politics ===
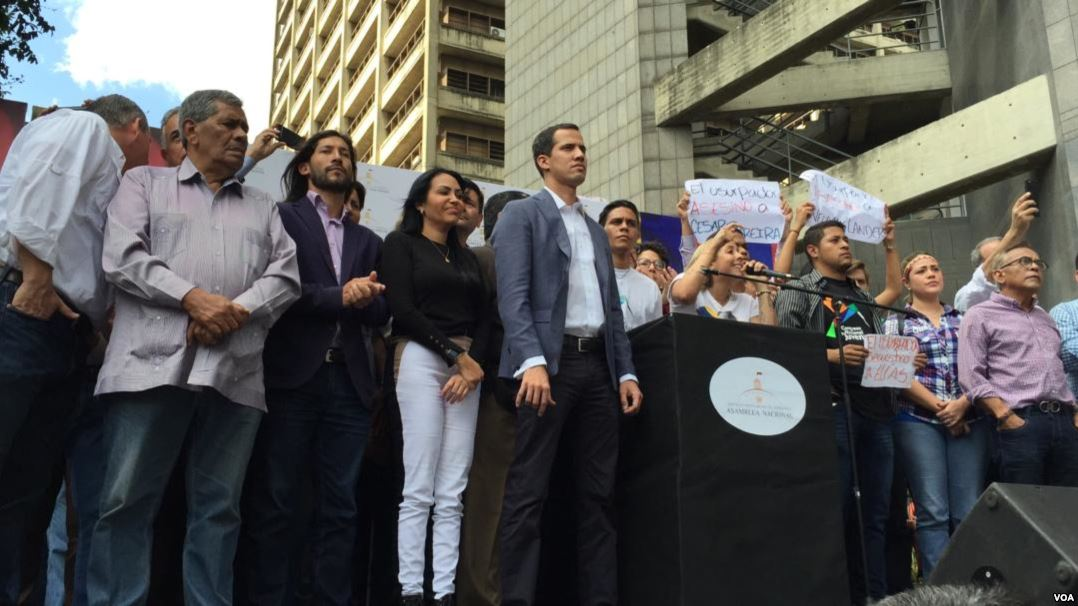
Venezuela's Juan Guaidó at an open cabildo in January 2019

In modern times, some Latin American countries have used the name "open cabildos" for public assemblies convened by municipal governments to decide local matters of public importance. The term is sometimes used for present-day public meetings to make decisions. Some modern versions, while using the historically evocative name, can be more similar to an outdoor rally.

In Venezuela, the open cabildo is one part of a set of provisions required to preserve democracy. Article 70 of the nation's Constitution says that "there [must be] methods for the people to exercise their sovereignty in politics [including] the open forum and assembly of citizens whose decisions will be binding". Because the legally binding vote is tied to the open cabildo, the Constitution may be interpreted to say that the forum can still have the power of a political referendum.

== See also ==
- Ancient Regime of Spain – Spanish regime in the 15th–18th centuries
- Concejo abierto – Institution charged with local government and administration in Spain
- Concejo (historical)
- Council of the Indies – Spain's advisors on America, East and West Indies
- Historiography of Colonial Spanish America
- Junta (Spanish American Independence)
- Popular sovereignty – Idea that the people are the source of all power
- Real Audiencia – Appellate court within Spain and its empire
- Retroversion of the sovereignty to the people – Political concept in Spanish America
- Spanish colonization of the Americas
- Tertulia – Social gathering with literary or artistic overtones
- Timeline of the Spanish American wars of independence
