= La Libertad Province =

La Libertad Province Provincia de La Libertad
- Province
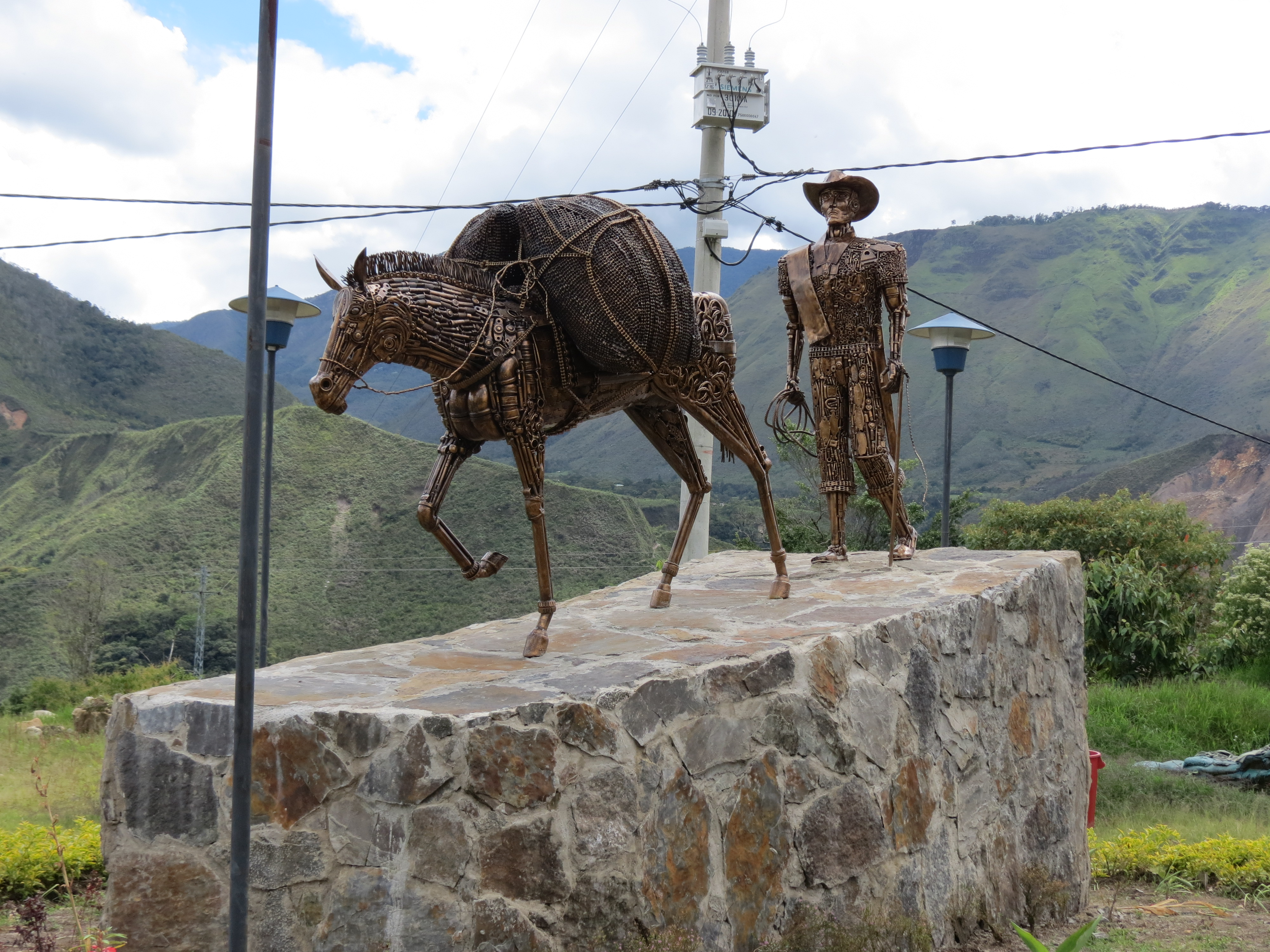
- Statue honouring the coffee farmers, Pisba
- Etymology: Liberty from the Spanish Empire
- Location of La Libertad Province in Colombia
- Coordinates: 5°34′00″N 72°34′00″W
- Country: Colombia
- Department: Boyacá
- Capital: Labranzagrande
- Municipalities: 4

Area
  - Total: 1,890 km^{2} (730 sq mi)
- Time zone: UTC−5 (COT)
- Indigenous groups: Achagua; Guahibo; Muisca; U'wa

La Libertad Province is a province of the Colombian Department of Boyacá. The province is formed by 4 municipalities. The province bears its name for the liberty gained from the Spanish Empire after the independence of Gran Colombia.

== Municipalities ==
Labranzagrande • Pajarito • Paya • Pisba
