= Paya, Boyacá =

Coordinates: 5°38′N 72°26′W

Paya
- Municipality and town
- Flag

- Location of the municipality and town of Paya in the Boyacá department of Colombia
- Country: Colombia
- Department: Boyacá Department
- Province: La Libertad Province
- Founded: 14 September 1600

Government
  - Mayor: Benjamín Pérez Cristancho (2020–2023)

Area
  - Municipality and town: 435.503 km^{2} (168.149 sq mi)
  - Urban: 225.503 km^{2} (87.067 sq mi)
- Elevation: 950 m (3,120 ft)

Population (2015)
  - Municipality and town: 2,550
  - Density: 5.86/km^{2} (15.2/sq mi)
  - Urban: 580
- Time zone: UTC-5 (Colombia Standard Time)
- Website: Official website

Paya is a town and municipality in the La Libertad Province, part of the Colombian department of Boyacá. Paya limits Pisba, Labranzagrande of Boyacá and Támara, Nunchía and Yopal (Casanare).

== Etymology ==
Paya in Chibcha means "People of hope".

== History ==
Before the Spanish conquest in the 1530s, Paya was inhabited by the Muisca, organized in their loose Muisca Confederation.

Modern Paya was founded on September 14, 1600.

== Economy ==
The majority of the economy of Paya comes from horticulture (47%). Other areas of income are livestock farming (37%) and agriculture (16%).
