= Quito Rebellion =

Quito Rebellion may refer to:

- Quito Revolt of 1765
- Quito Revolution (1809–1812)
