= Pajarito, Boyacá =

Coordinates: 5°25′N 72°40′W

Pajarito
- Municipality and town
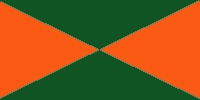
- Flag

- Location of the municipality and town of Pajarito in the Boyacá department of Colombia
- Country: Colombia
- Department: Boyacá Department
- Province: La Libertad Province
- Founded: 1 January 1853

Government
  - Mayor: Jesús Noé Riveros López (2020-2023)

Area
  - Municipality and town: 322 km^{2} (124 sq mi)
- Elevation: 800 m (2,600 ft)

Population (2015)
  - Municipality and town: 1,719
  - Density: 5.34/km^{2} (13.8/sq mi)
  - Urban: 725
- Time zone: UTC-5 (Colombia Standard Time)
- Website: Official website

Pajarito is a town and municipality in the La Libertad Province, part of the Colombian department of Boyacá. The municipality, situated in the southeast of the department borders Labranzagrande and Aquitania of the department of Boyacá and Yopal, Recetor and Aguazul of the department of Casanare. The urban centre is located at a distance of 147 kilometres (91 mi) from the department capital Tunja at an altitude of 800 metres (2,600 ft) in a tight valley, not allowing much expansion of the urban area. The centre is experiencing periodic landslides.

== Etymology ==
The name Pajarito in Spanish means "little bird", yet the origin of the name is thought to be from Chibcha: Pa is "father", ja; "load, role", rito; "dog".

== Geology ==
The area of Pajarito is characterized by an intrusive complex into the surrounding Lower Cretaceous sediments (Macanal Formation). The petrology of the igneous body is alkaline to sub-alkaline and low in SiO_{2}. Secondary minerals are apatite and hydrothermal chlorite.

== History ==
The first inhabitants of the village may have been indigenous people of the Golconda tribe, short in stature and bandy-legged. The Golcondenses were cultivators of maize and hunters. They spoke a version of Chibcha, giving rise to the name of the town.

Modern Pajarito was founded on January 1, 1853 by soldiers of Gran Colombia. The first mayors were military men.

== Economy ==
Pajarito is a rural community centered around agriculture and livestock farming. Main agricultural products cultivated in the municipality are coffee, maize, sugarcane, yuca, beans and potatoes. Hot springs are present outside the urban centre.

== Climate ==
Pajarito has a tropical monsoon climate (Am) with moderate to little rainfall from December to March and heavy to very heavy rainfall in the remaining months.

Climate data for Pajarito (Corinto), elevation 1,550 m (5,090 ft), (1981–2010)
| Month | Jan | Feb | Mar | Apr | May | Jun | Jul | Aug | Sep | Oct | Nov | Dec | Year |
|---|---|---|---|---|---|---|---|---|---|---|---|---|---|
| Mean daily maximum °C (°F) | 24.1 (75.4) | 24.8 (76.6) | 24.2 (75.6) | 23.7 (74.7) | 23.5 (74.3) | 22.8 (73.0) | 22.1 (71.8) | 22.7 (72.9) | 23.4 (74.1) | 23.7 (74.7) | 23.5 (74.3) | 24.0 (75.2) | 23.5 (74.3) |
| Daily mean °C (°F) | 19.1 (66.4) | 19.5 (67.1) | 19.4 (66.9) | 19.1 (66.4) | 18.9 (66.0) | 18.4 (65.1) | 18.0 (64.4) | 18.1 (64.6) | 18.5 (65.3) | 18.9 (66.0) | 19.0 (66.2) | 19.2 (66.6) | 18.8 (65.8) |
| Mean daily minimum °C (°F) | 13.4 (56.1) | 14.1 (57.4) | 14.6 (58.3) | 15.0 (59.0) | 15.0 (59.0) | 14.7 (58.5) | 14.3 (57.7) | 14.2 (57.6) | 14.1 (57.4) | 14.3 (57.7) | 14.4 (57.9) | 13.6 (56.5) | 14.3 (57.7) |
| Average precipitation mm (inches) | 47.4 (1.87) | 66.0 (2.60) | 130.1 (5.12) | 267.4 (10.53) | 385.9 (15.19) | 394.0 (15.51) | 397.2 (15.64) | 361.4 (14.23) | 352.8 (13.89) | 336.1 (13.23) | 240.7 (9.48) | 74.9 (2.95) | 3,054 (120.2) |
| Average precipitation days (≥ 1.0 mm) | 9 | 10 | 15 | 22 | 25 | 26 | 27 | 27 | 25 | 26 | 22 | 13 | 240 |
| Average relative humidity (%) | 86 | 85 | 86 | 90 | 91 | 92 | 92 | 91 | 90 | 89 | 90 | 88 | 89 |
Source: Instituto de Hidrologia Meteorologia y Estudios Ambientales

== Bibliography ==
- Moreno Murillo, Juan Manuel; Concha Perdomo, Ana Elena; Lozano, Elsy Liliana (2007). "Petrogenesis y Geoquímica del cuerpo ígneo de Pajarito, Boyacá - Colombia" [Petrogenesis and Geochemestry [sic] of the Pajarito igneous body, Boyacá - Colombia] (PDF). Geología Colombiana (in Spanish). 32. Universidad Nacional de Colombia. ISSN 0072-0992.
