= Retroversion of sovereignty to the people =

Political concept in Spanish America

The retroversion of sovereignty was a political solution that emerged during the crisis caused by the Abdications of Bayonne in 1808, when the Spanish Bourbons renounced their rights to the Crown in favor of Napoleon, who appointed his brother Joseph Bonaparte King of Spain and the Indies. In the absence of the legitimate king, his authority was considered to revert to the ‘‘pueblos’’ (local communities represented by their ‘‘cabildos’’), which could form juntas to exercise government. As a legal precedent, the Siete Partidas had already allowed assemblies of local notables to resolve situations not covered by existing law (’‘vacatio legis’’), but applying this mechanism to the absence of the king (’‘vacatio regis’’) was an innovation of 1808.

In both Spain and Spanish America, the retroversion of sovereignty was followed by attempts to relocate sovereignty from the ‘‘pueblos’’ (plural, referring to local political communities) to representative assemblies based on the principle of popular sovereignty, understood as the sovereignty of the ‘‘pueblo’’ (singular, the people as a collective political body). However, the two concepts—’‘sovereignty of the pueblos’’ and ‘‘sovereignty of the pueblo’’—continued to coexist during the nineteenth century. In Spanish America, this transformation formed part of the political and constitutional processes that eventually led to the establishment of independent states. In Spanish America, self-government did not initially imply absolute independence from the Spanish Monarchy; independence developed gradually during the revolutionary process.

== Historical development ==
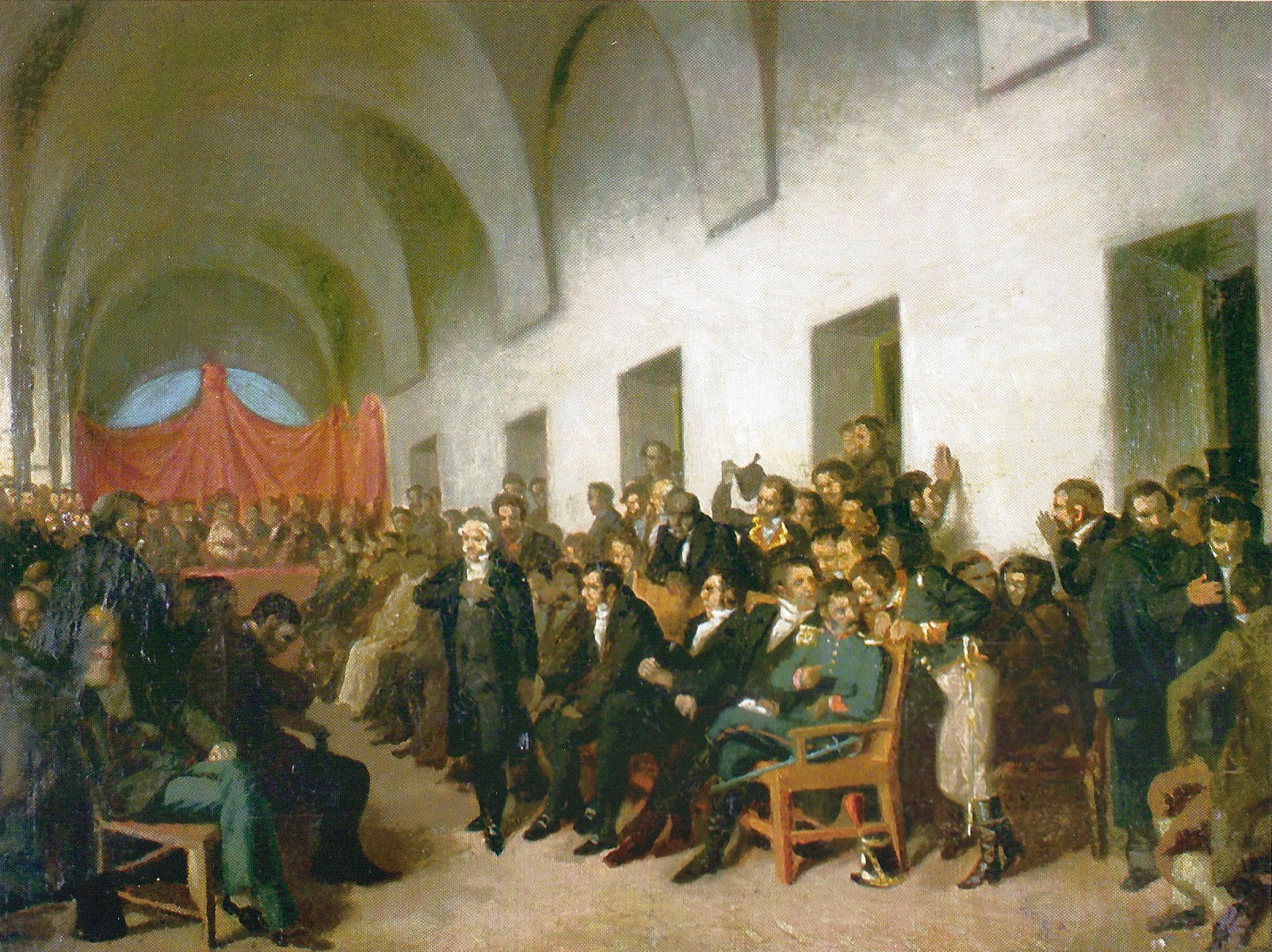
The open cabildo will become in Juntas in Spanish America.

In 1808, the Abdications of Bayonne created an unprecedented crisis in the Spanish Monarchy. The Spanish Bourbons renounced their rights to the Crown in favor of Napoleon, who appointed his brother Joseph Bonaparte King of Spain and the Indies. Joseph was not recognized as the legitimate monarch by much of the Spanish population, and governing juntas were established in different territories to exercise government in the absence of the legitimate king.

The Siete Partidas provided a legal precedent for assemblies of local notables to resolve situations not covered by existing law (’‘vacatio legis’’). However, applying this mechanism to the absence of the legitimate king (’‘vacatio regis’’) was an innovation of the crisis of 1808. The resulting concept of retroversion of sovereignty held that the authority exercised by the king reverted to the ‘‘pueblos’’ (local communities represented by their ‘‘cabildos’’), which could establish juntas to exercise government. Historian Antonio Annino describes the events of 1808 as giving ‘‘juntismo’’ an unprecedented character and argues that retroversion had not previously been formulated as a political doctrine.

The juntas initially sought to preserve the existing monarchical order rather than establish independent states. In September 1808, the peninsular juntas sent representatives to form the Supreme Central and Governing Junta of the Kingdom, which attempted to exercise central authority in the name of Ferdinand VII. The dissolution of the Supreme Central Junta and its replacement by the Council of Regency in 1810 created a new crisis of legitimacy in Spanish America, where several ‘‘pueblos’’ established their own juntas. The traditional institutions and laws of the Monarchy nevertheless remained an important source of legitimacy during this process.

One interpretation of the legal status of Spanish America held that the American territories were linked to the Spanish monarch through the Crown of Castile, rather than being subordinate to the Spanish nation, and that the different laws governing Spain and the Indies reflected this distinction. This interpretation was invoked by some contemporary political actors during the monarchical crisis. In the Río de la Plata, for example, arguments were made that American kingdoms were not constitutionally required to submit to peninsular juntas and that Americans possessed the same right to establish legitimate authorities in the absence of the monarch.

The transfer of sovereignty to the ‘‘pueblos’’ did not initially amount to the modern principle of popular sovereignty. Annino distinguishes between the ‘‘sovereignty of the pueblos’’ (plural) and the later ‘‘sovereignty of the pueblo’’ (singular), associated with representative government. Both concepts continued to coexist during the nineteenth century. In Spanish America, self-government did not initially imply absolute independence from the Spanish Monarchy; independence developed gradually during the revolutionary process.

The crisis also gave renewed importance to the principle of ‘‘consentimiento’’ (consent). In Spanish America, political bodies that claimed to represent cities, provinces, or emerging states rejected decisions made without their consent. José Carlos Chiaramonte describes this as part of the disputes over the location and exercise of sovereignty following the collapse of royal authority.

== See also ==
- Open cabildo
- School of Salamanca
- Francisco Suárez
