= Cabildo abierto del 22 de mayo de 1810 =

Painting by Pedro Subercaseaux

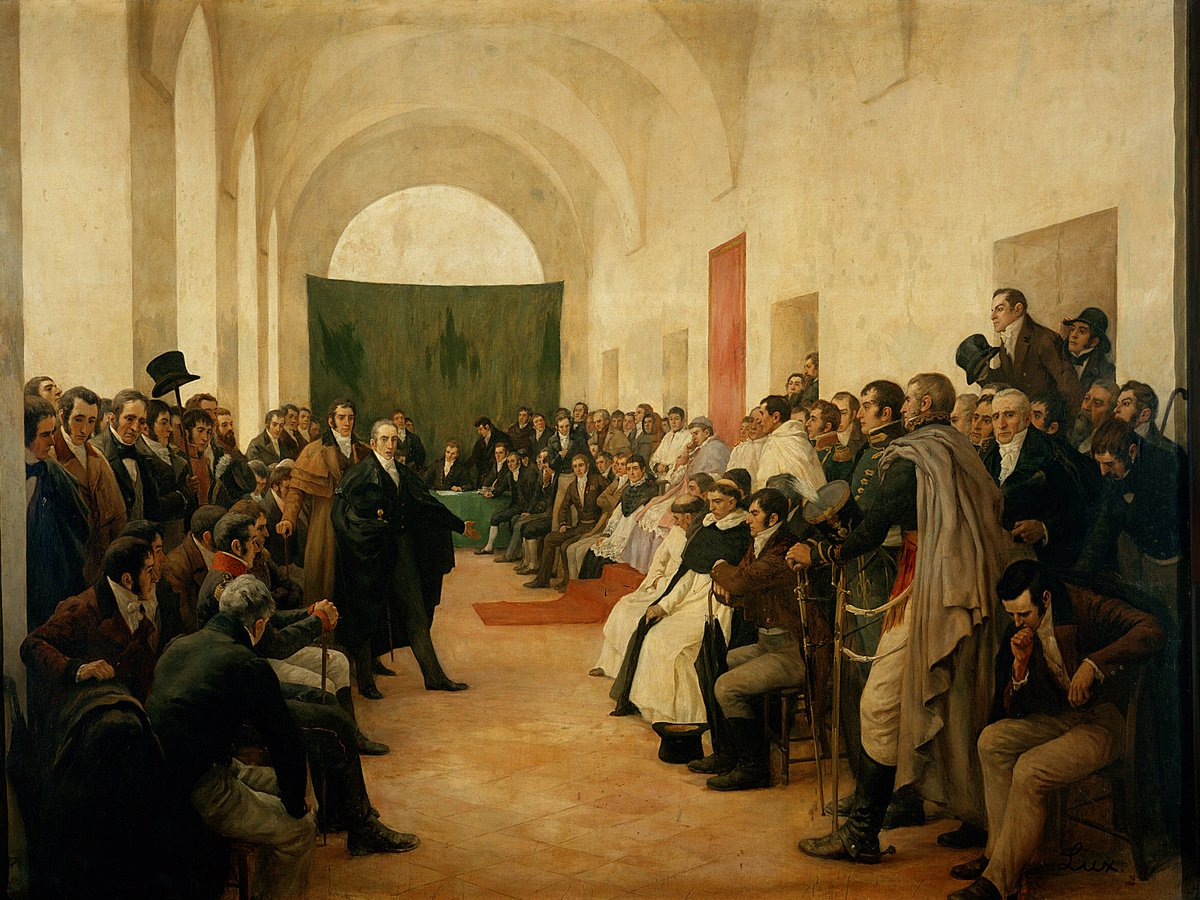
The open cabildo on 22 May 1810, by Pedro Subercaseaux, depiction of the 22 May open cabildo

Cabildo abierto del 22 de mayo de 1810 ("Open Cabildo of 22 May 1810") is a 1908 painting made by the Chilean artist Pedro Subercaseaux. It shows the artist's interpretation of the Open Cabildo that took place in Buenos Aires on 22 May 1810, in the Buenos Aires Cabildo, and which was a turning point of the May Revolution.

== Creation ==
The portrait was painted in Chile in 1908, as requested by Ángel Justiniano Carranza, for the centennial of the May Revolution that would take place in 1810. Subercaseaux mailed the following terms:

...if, as I hope, it is worthy of the matter, I resolve to undertake this work, warning you that if the conduct to the satisfaction, it will be worth fifteen thousand pesos in national currency, with the dimensions of the box four feet wide by three high.

According to current European historicist, Subercaseaux tried to choose a defining moment, recreate the atmosphere and give the magnificence required. He based his lighting and perspective studies on contemporary photos inside the Buenos Aires Cabildo, although it had been remodeled and was no longer similar to the colonial period. The moment depicted is the one when Juan José Paso, who is the one that stands out from the crowd on the left, takes his turn to talk. In the crowd right in front, Mariano Moreno is represented with a grave and worried face.

Currently, the portrait is kept at the National Historical Museum.
