= U'wa people =

Indigenous people living in the cloud forests of northeastern Colombia

U'wa
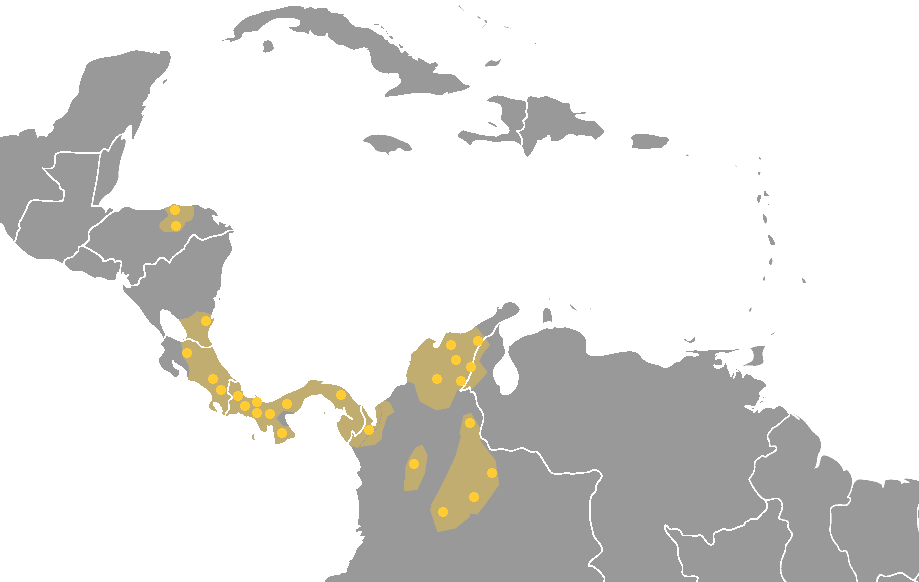
- Map of Chibcha languages; the U'wa are represented by the easternmost yellow dot

Total population
- 7,000–8,000

Regions with significant populations
- Colombia (Arauca, Boyacá, Casanare, Santander & Northern Santander)

Languages
- Uw Cuwa, Colombian Spanish

Religion
- Chibcha religion

Related ethnic groups
- Muisca, Lache, Guane, Guahibo

The U'wa are an indigenous people living in the cloud forests of northeastern Colombia. Historically, the U'wa numbered as many as 20,000, scattered over a homeland that extended across the Venezuela-Colombia border. Some 7-8,000 U'wa are alive today.

The U'wa are known to neighboring indigenous peoples as "the thinking people" or "the people who speak well". They were formerly called Tunebo, but today prefer to be known as U'wa, meaning "people".

== Struggle to prevent oil drilling ==
They gained international visibility in a 14-year-long struggle to prevent oil drilling on their land, which secured the withdrawal of Royal Dutch Shell and Occidental Petroleum (Oxy), and continues as Ecopetrol and Repsol YPF seek to drill on their land. Their representative to the outside world in this struggle, Berito Kuwaru'wa, won the Goldman Environmental Prize in 1998. The conflict came to a head as Oxy prepared to drill at the Gibraltar 1 test site. The U'wa, who had previously threatened to commit mass suicide if the oil extraction project went forward, constructed a small village on the site of the drillsite. They also set up numerous roadblocks and coordinated (together with neighboring campesinos and the Guahibo) a regional social strike that paralyzed the surrounding area. Although the Colombian military dislodged the protesters from the site, no commercially viable deposits were found. The U'wa were then in a new dispute with Ecopetrol, which was seeking to prospect for oil on their lands, after legal battles and non-violent protests, Ecopetrol withdrew.

== Geography ==
The U'wa people live in northeastern Colombia, in the departments of Arauca, Boyacá, Casanare, Santander and Northern Santander. Historically, they also populated what is now Venezuela.

=== Territory ===
The U'wa ancestral homeland, known as Kajka-Ika or Kera Chikara, lies in the Sierra Nevada del Cocuy and covers more than 12,000 square kilometres (4,600 sq mi). The area includes the headwaters of the Orinoco River. Historically, substantial portions of their homeland have been protected from any human access.

The U'wa have been engaged in a major project of land recovery, expanding their recognized territory from 1,000 square kilometres (250,000 acres) to 2,200 square kilometres (540,000 acres) Unified Reserve (Resguardo Unido) in 1999.

=== Municipalities belonging to U'wa territory ===
The U'wa inhabited the highlands of northernmost Boyacá and western Arauca and Casanare.

Name	Department	Altitude (m) urban centre	Map
Cubará	Boyacá	380	
Labranzagrande (shared with Achagua & Guahibo)	Boyacá	1210	
Saravena	Arauca	2600	
Sácama	Casanare	1250	
Támara (shared with Achagua)	Casanare	1156	
Nunchía (shared with Achagua)	Casanare	398	

== Culture ==
Their religious tradition includes an obligation to gather in the summer months and "sing the world into being" as well as to maintain equilibrium between the layers of the world: earth, water, oil, mountains, and sky. Their identification of petroleum, which they call Ruiria, with the blood of Mother Earth, stiffened their resolve in their conflict with oil corporations in the 1990s.

The U'wa consider non-U'wa to be impure, and place high importance on purification rituals, which makes interaction with outsiders difficult.

=== Language ===
The U'wa speak a language of the Chibchan family called Uw Cuwa ("people's tongue"). They have no written tradition and have passed down their knowledge and customs primarily through song.

== Institutions ==
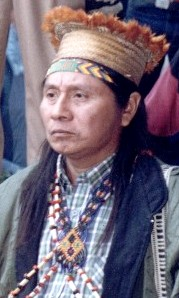
U'wa leader Berito Kubaru'wa

The U'wa organize their political life in a collection of institutions known to the outside world as the U'wa Traditional Authorities. This body is made up of Werjayás (wise elders) and Karekas (medicine people) from each of the U'wa clans. The system of Cabildos mandated by the Colombian state includes an upper and lower council or Cabildo Mayor and Cabildo Menor, as well as the positions of President, Vice President, Secretary, Treasurer, Public Prosecutor and Speaker. Berito KuwarU'wa has served as president in recent years.

The U'wa have affiliated with the Guahibo in the Association of Cabildos and Traditional Indigenous Authorities of the Department of Arauca (ASCATIDAR), officially founded in June 2003 to promote the local autonomy of the department's indigenous peoples. The Association's president is Dario Tulivila, a Guahibo leader.

=== Clans ===
The U'wa were grouped into eight clans from time immemorial to the 20th century. Three clans survived their dramatic population loss in the last hundred years and structure their communal life today: Kubaruwa (Cobaria), Tagrinuwa (Tegria) and Kaibaká (Bokota), each of which includes multiple communities. The U'wa population includes some 822 families.

== See also ==
- Muisca
- Guane, Guayupe, Lache
