= Maracaibo Province (Spanish Empire) =

Administrative division of the Spanish Empire (1676-1824); part of present-day Venezuela

Coordinates: 10°38′N 71°38′W

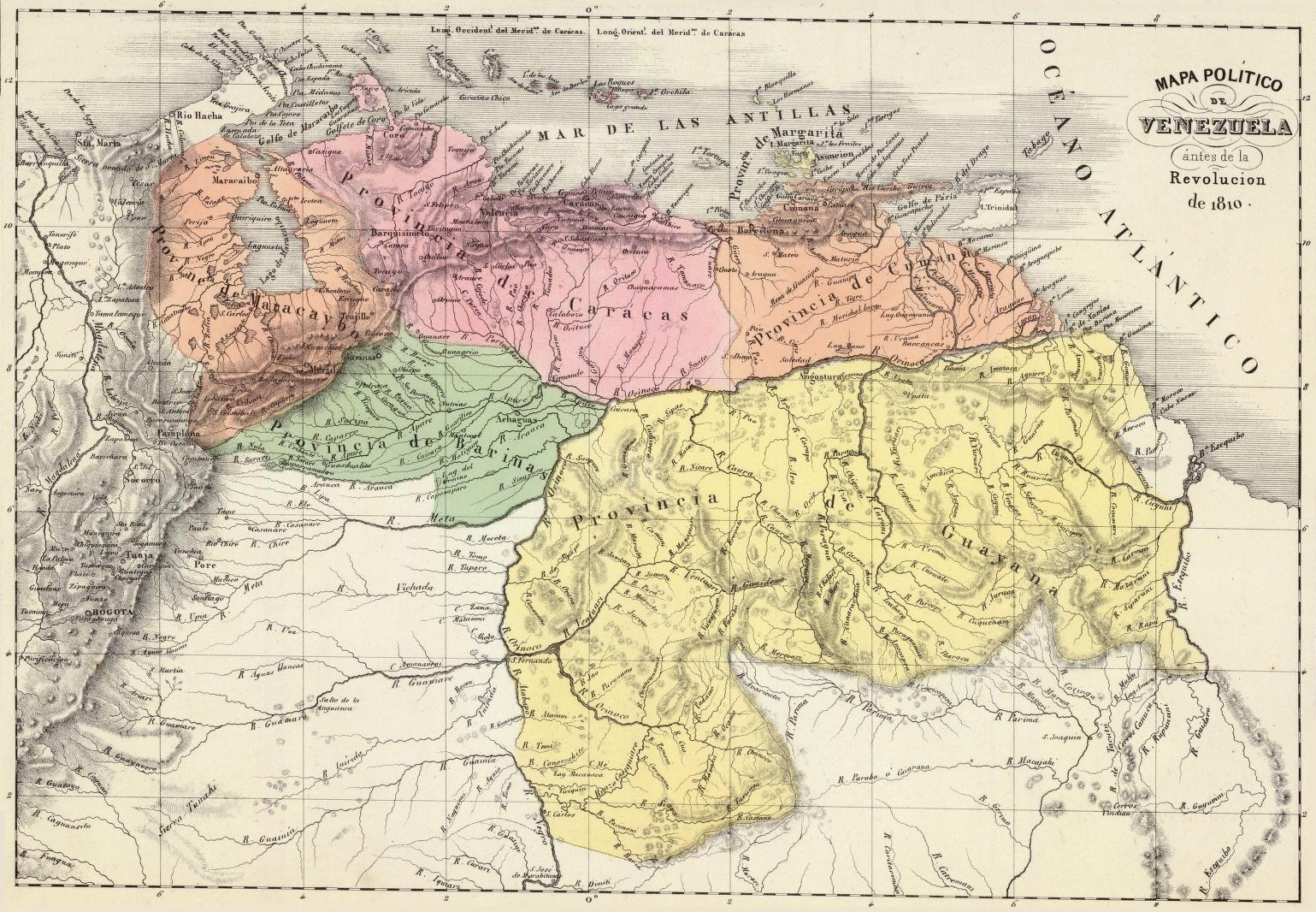
Map of Venezuela in 1810, including Provincia de Maracaybo (in orange on the left) and Provincia de Barinas (in green).

Maracaibo Province or Maracaybo Province from 1676 to 1824 was a province of the Spanish Empire. It resulted from a merger of the former Province of Mérida (1622–1676) with the territory of Maracaibo.

In 1777, Captaincy General of Venezuela was created and the province was part of it. In 1786, Barinas Province was created from western parts of Maracaibo.

== Gallery ==
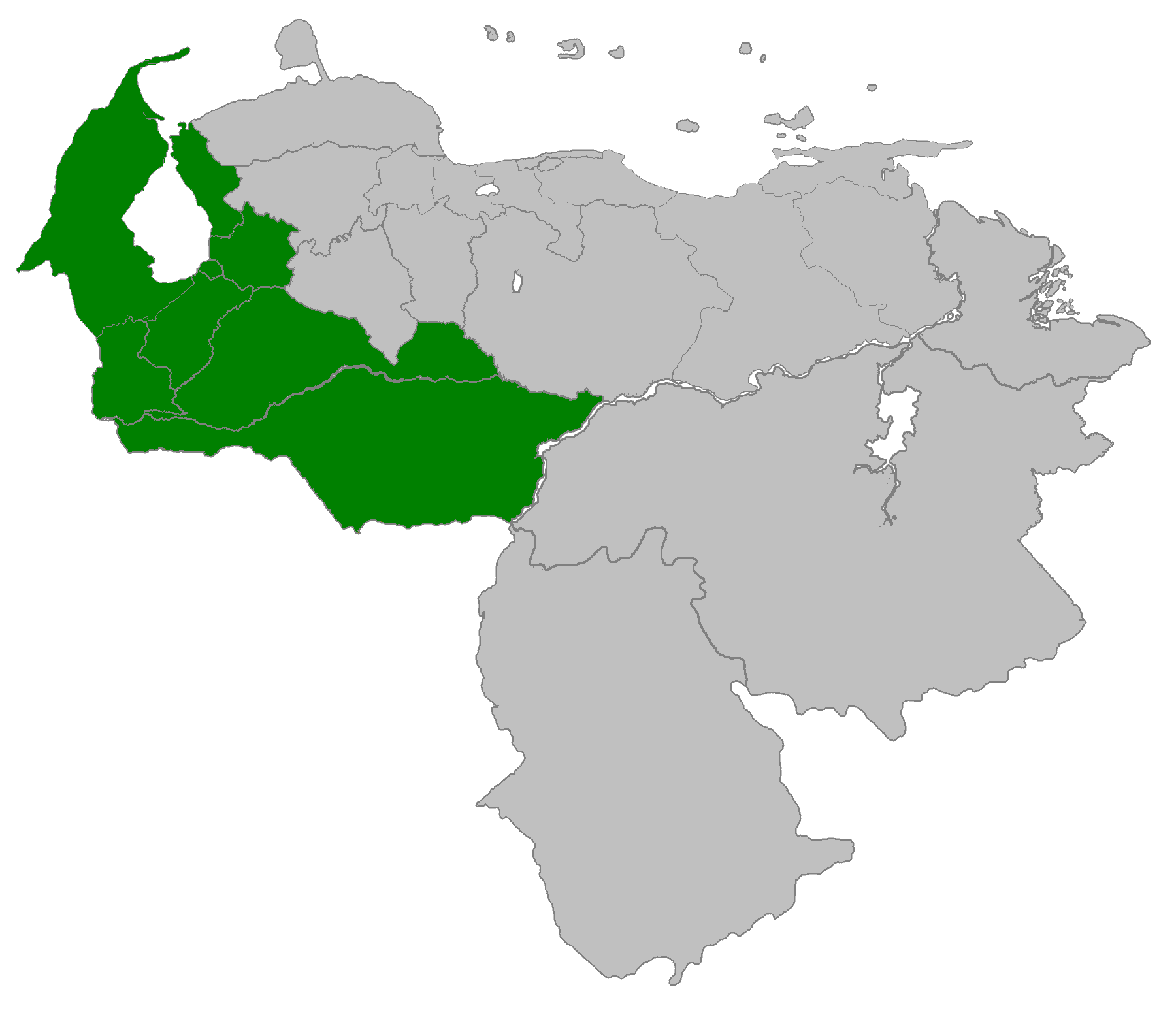
Maracaibo Province, 1676–1786

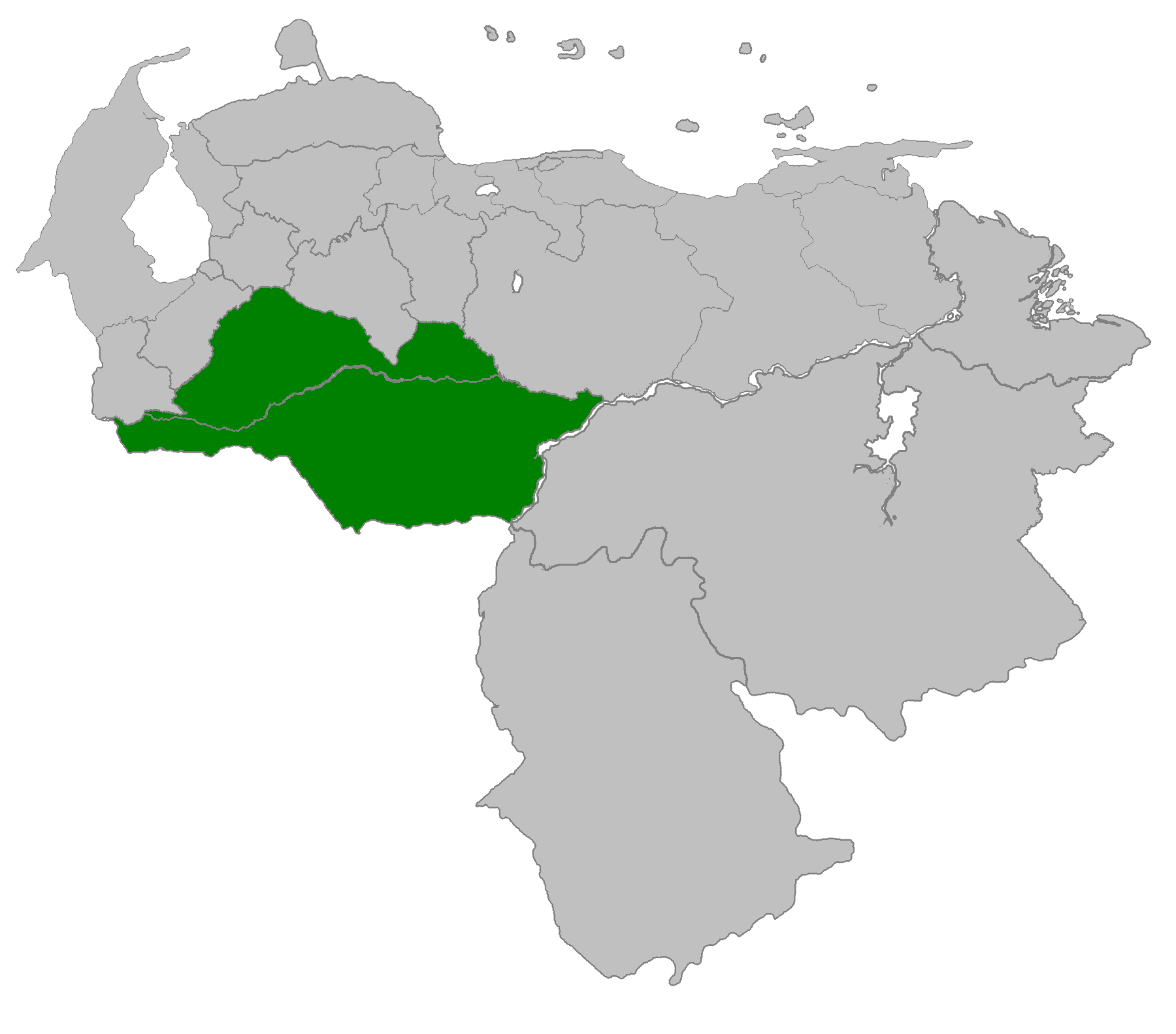
Barinas Province, split from Maracaibo Province in 1786
