= Junta (Spanish American Independence) =

Alternative to independence used in Spanish colonies in the Americas

A Junta (Spanish pronunciation: [ˈxunta]) was a form of extraordinary government established in Spain and Spanish America during the crisis of the Spanish Monarchy that began in 1808. In Spanish America, juntas were generally formed in urban centers and frequently developed from existing cabildos(municipal councils), enlarged by the participation of other prominent members of the local community.

== Overview ==
Juntas emerged following the Abdications of Bayonne and the resulting absence of a generally recognized legitimate monarch. Spanish Americans initially responded to the crisis in ways similar to those adopted in Peninsular Spain, drawing on traditional institutions and legal concepts to justify the creation of extraordinary governments.

The Siete Partidas provided a legal precedent for assemblies of local notables to resolve situations not covered by existing law ("vacatio legis"). However, applying this mechanism to the absence of the legitimate king ("vacatio regis") was an innovation of the crisis of 1808. The resulting concept of retroversion of sovereignty held that the authority exercised by the king reverted to the "pueblos" (local communities represented by their "cabildos"), which could establish juntas to exercise government.

The establishment of juntas did not initially imply independence from the Spanish Monarchy. Many juntas claimed to exercise authority in the name of Ferdinand VII, while disputes developed over which institutions could legitimately exercise central authority during his absence. In Spanish America, the dissolution of the Supreme Central Junta and its replacement by the Council of Regency in 1810 contributed to the establishment of new local juntas.

The "sovereignty of the pueblos" that emerged from the crisis of 1808 should not be equated with the later principle of popular sovereignty. Historian Antonio Annino distinguishes between the "sovereignty of the pueblos" (plural) and the "sovereignty of the pueblo" (singular), associated with representative government; both concepts continued to coexist during the nineteenth century.

Political positions within Spanish America subsequently diverged. Some groups continued to favor self-government within the Spanish Monarchy, while others increasingly supported absolute independence and the creation of new sovereign states. Self-government therefore did not initially imply absolute independence; independence developed gradually during the revolutionary process.

== Chronology ==
Year	Date	Name	Place	Current country	Heads of Junta
1808	August 5	Junta 1808 México	Viceroyalty of Nueva Spain	Mexico	Francisco Primo de Verdad; Melchor de Talamantes; José de Iturrigaray
1808	September 21	Junta de Montevideo	Viceroyalty of the Río de la Plata	Uruguay	Francisco Javier de Elío
1809	May 25	Junta of Chuquisaca	Viceroyalty of the Río de la Plata	Bolivia	Bernardo de Monteagudo; Jaime de Zudáñez
1809	July 16	Junta Tuitiva (created by La Paz revolution)	Viceroyalty of the Río de la Plata	Bolivia	Pedro Murillo
1809	August 10	Junta of Quito	Viceroyalty of New Granada	Ecuador	Juan Pío Montúfar
1810	April 19	Junta Suprema de Caracas	Captaincy General of Venezuela	Venezuela	José de las Llamozas; Martín Tovar Ponte
1810	May 22	Junta de Cartagena	Viceroyalty of New Granada	Colombia	José María García de Toledo
1810	May 25	Primera Junta de Buenos Aires	Viceroyalty of the Río de la Plata	Argentina	Cornelio Saavedra; Mariano Moreno/Juan José Paso; Juan José Castelli/Miguel de Azcuénaga/Manuel Belgrano/Manuel Alberti/Domingo Matheu/Juan Larrea
1810	July 3	Junta extraordinaria de Santiago de Cali	Viceroyalty of New Granada	Colombia	Joaquín de Caycedo y Cuero
1810	July 20	Junta de Santa Fe	Viceroyalty of New Granada	Colombia	Francisco José de Caldas; Camilo Torres
1810	September 16	(created after the Grito de Dolores)	Viceroyalty of New Spain	Mexico	Miguel Hidalgo y Costilla
1810	September 18	Government Junta of Chile (1810)	Captaincy General of Chile	Chile	Juan Martínez de Rozas; Mateo de Toro y Zambrano
1811	February 27	(created after the Cry of Asencio)	Viceroyalty of the Río de la Plata	Uruguay	Pedro José Viera; Venancio Benavides
1811	May 15	Junta del Paraguay	Viceroyalty of the Río de la Plata	Paraguay	Pedro Caballero; Fulgencio Yegros; Gaspar Rodríguez de Francia
1811	November 5	Primera Junta de San Salvador, in 1811 Independence Movement	Captaincy General of Guatemala	El Salvador	José Matías Delgado; Manuel José Arce; Pedro Pablo Castillo; Juan Manuel Rodríguez
1814	August 3	Junta de Gobierno del Cuzco	Viceroyalty of Peru	Peru	Mateo Pumacahua; Domingo Luis Astete; Tomás Moscoso; Hermanos Angulo

== See also ==
- Junta (Peninsular War)
- Retroversion of the sovereignty to the people
- Spanish colonization of the Americas
