= Quito Revolt of 1765 =

Rebellion against the Spanish Empire

Date	May 22, 1765 – September 1, 1766
Location	Quito, New Granada (now Ecuador)
Result	Spanish victory

The Quito Revolt of 1765, also known as the Rebellion of the Barrios or the Quito Insurrection, was an uprising and insurrection in Quito that temporarily overthrew the colonial Spanish Viceroyalty of New Granada in the city from 1765 until 1766.

== History ==
At the time of the revolt, Quito was a large city and capital of the Real Audiencia of Quito at the southern edge of the colonial Spanish Viceroyalty of New Granada. Relatively isolated, the city had ties not only to the seat of the viceroyalty in Bogotá, but also to the nearby Viceroyalty of Peru.

The uprising began on May 22, 1765, as a revolt against new imperial taxes on aguardiente. Tensions remained high until June 24 when the revolt turned into an insurrection led by the poorer classes from the barrios that overthrew the colonial government in Quito on June 27 and expelled the peninsulars from the City. A popular coalition of the land-owning criollo and working-class mestizo population governed a united Quito until political differences emerged in 1766. The unity of the popular coalition eventually collapsed and a Spanish army from Guayaquil led by Antonio de Zelaya entered Quito on September 1, 1766 effectively unopposed, returning the city to viceregal control.

The Quito Revolt is seen as a precursor to further revolts across Spanish America in the late 18th century that eventually culminated with the Spanish American wars of independence of the early 19th century. The event was the largest rebellion against colonial Spain in South America until the Rebellion of Túpac Amaru II in Peru in 1780.

== See also ==
- Revolt of the Comuneros, Paraguay, 1730
- Rebellion of Túpac Amaru II, Peru, 1780
- Revolt of the Comuneros, Colombia, 1781
