= Támara, Casanare =

Coordinates: 5.82972°N 72.1633°W

Támara
- Municipality and town
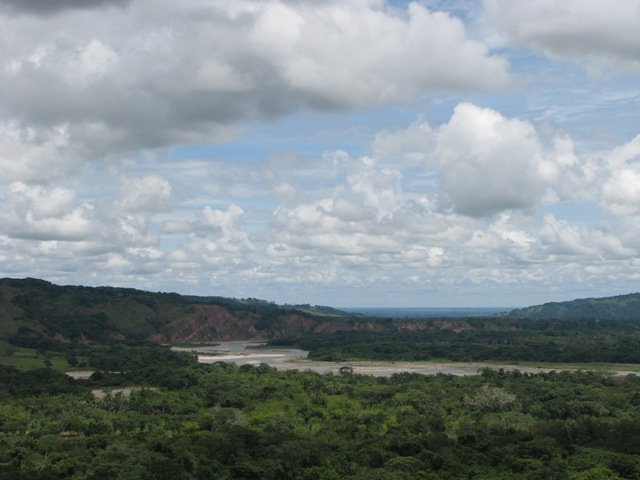
- View of rural Támara

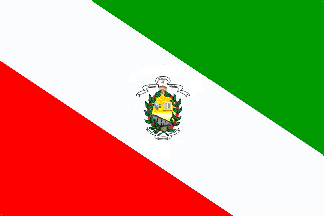
- Flag

- Location of the municipality and town of Tamara, Casanare in the Casanare Department of Colombia.
- Country: Colombia
- Department: Casanare Department
- Founded: 6 August 1628
- Founder: José Dadey Pey

Government
  - Mayor: Leonel Rodríguez gualteros (2016-2019)

Area
  - Municipality and town: 1,181.81 km^{2} (456.30 sq mi)
  - Urban: 0.99031 km^{2} (0.38236 sq mi)
- Elevation: 1,156 m (3,793 ft)

Population (2015)
  - Municipality and town: 7,044
  - Density: 5.960/km^{2} (15.44/sq mi)
  - Urban: 2,327
- Time zone: UTC-5 (Colombia Standard Time)
- Website: Official website

Támara is a town and municipality in the Department of Casanare, Colombia. The urban centre is located at an altitude of 1,156 metres (3,793 ft) at a distance of 95 kilometres (59 mi) from the department capital Yopal. It borders in the north Sacama, in the east Pore and Paz de Ariporo, in the west Socotá of the department of Boyacá and in the south Nunchia and Paya, Boyacá.

== History ==
Támara before the Spanish conquest of the Muisca was an important cotton producing village.

Modern Támara was founded on August 6, 1628, by José Dadey Pey.

== Economy ==
Main economical activities in Támara are agriculture; coffee, yuca, maize, bananas and sugarcane and livestock farming.
