= Supreme Central Junta =

Spanish institution during the Peninsular War

Supreme Central Junta of the Kingdom
- Part of the Peninsular War and Spanish American Wars of Independence
- Coat of Arms of the Kingdom

- Map of the Kingdom of Spain and the Indies
- Date: 1808 to 1810
- Location: Spanish Empire
- Also known as: Supreme Central Junta of Spain and the Indies
- Outcome: Central Junta dissolved itself on 29 January 1810 and set up a Regency of Spain and the Indies and the Cortes of Cadiz

The Supreme Central Junta of the Kingdom or Supreme Central and Governing Junta of Spain and the Indies (Spanish: Junta Suprema Central y Gubernativa de España e Indias; was the Spanish organ (junta) that assumed the executive and legislative powers of the Kingdom of Spain and the Indias during the Peninsular War and the Napoleonic occupation of Spain.

It was established on 25 September 1808 following the Spanish victory at the Battle of Bailén and after the Council of Castile declared null and void the abdications of Charles IV and Ferdinand VII at Bayonne earlier in May. It was active until 30 January 1810. It was initially formed by the representatives of the provincial juntas and first met in Aranjuez chaired by the Count of Floridablanca, with 35 members in total.

After the apparent collapse of Spanish resistance to Napoleon, many Spanish Americans saw no reason to recognise a weakened government that might fall to the French at any moment, and began to organise local juntas to safeguard their territories' autonomy. The dissolution of the Supreme Central Junta in January 1810 marked a decisive turning point: the monarchy fractured, and rival projects for its reconstruction came into conflict, opening the political crisis from which the Spanish American wars of independence emerged.

== Alternative names of the Central Junta ==
The Central Junta, established on 25 September 1808, should not be confused with the "Supreme Junta of Government" (Junta Suprema de Gobierno), a regency body created on 10 April 1808 by King Ferdinand VII of Spain to run the affairs of the kingdom during his absence in France, where he had been summoned by Napoleon. After the Abdications of Bayonne on 4 May 1808, it was presided over by General Joachim Murat, Napoleon's lieutenant in Spain, until the arrival of Joseph Bonaparte as the new king of Spain. Nor should it be confused with the Junta of Seville, formed on 27 May 1808, which styled itself the "Supreme Junta of Government of Spain and the Indies" (Suprema Junta de Gobierno de España e Indias).

Alternative names of the Central Junta
Spanish name	English rendering	Notes
Junta Suprema Central y Gubernativa del Reino	Supreme Central and Governing Junta of the Kingdom	Institutional form; the name varies slightly across sources
Junta Central Suprema Gubernativa del Reino (also del Reyno)	Supreme Central Governing Junta of the Kingdom	Word-order variant
Junta Suprema Central Gubernativa de España e Indias	Supreme Central Governing Junta of Spain and the Indies	Form that explicitly names the overseas territories
Junta Central Suprema del Reino	Supreme Central Junta of the Kingdom	Shortened form
Suprema Junta Central	Supreme Central Junta	Shortened form
Junta Suprema del Reino (also del Reyno)	Supreme Junta of the Kingdom	Shortened form
Junta Central	Central Junta	Common short form

== Origins ==
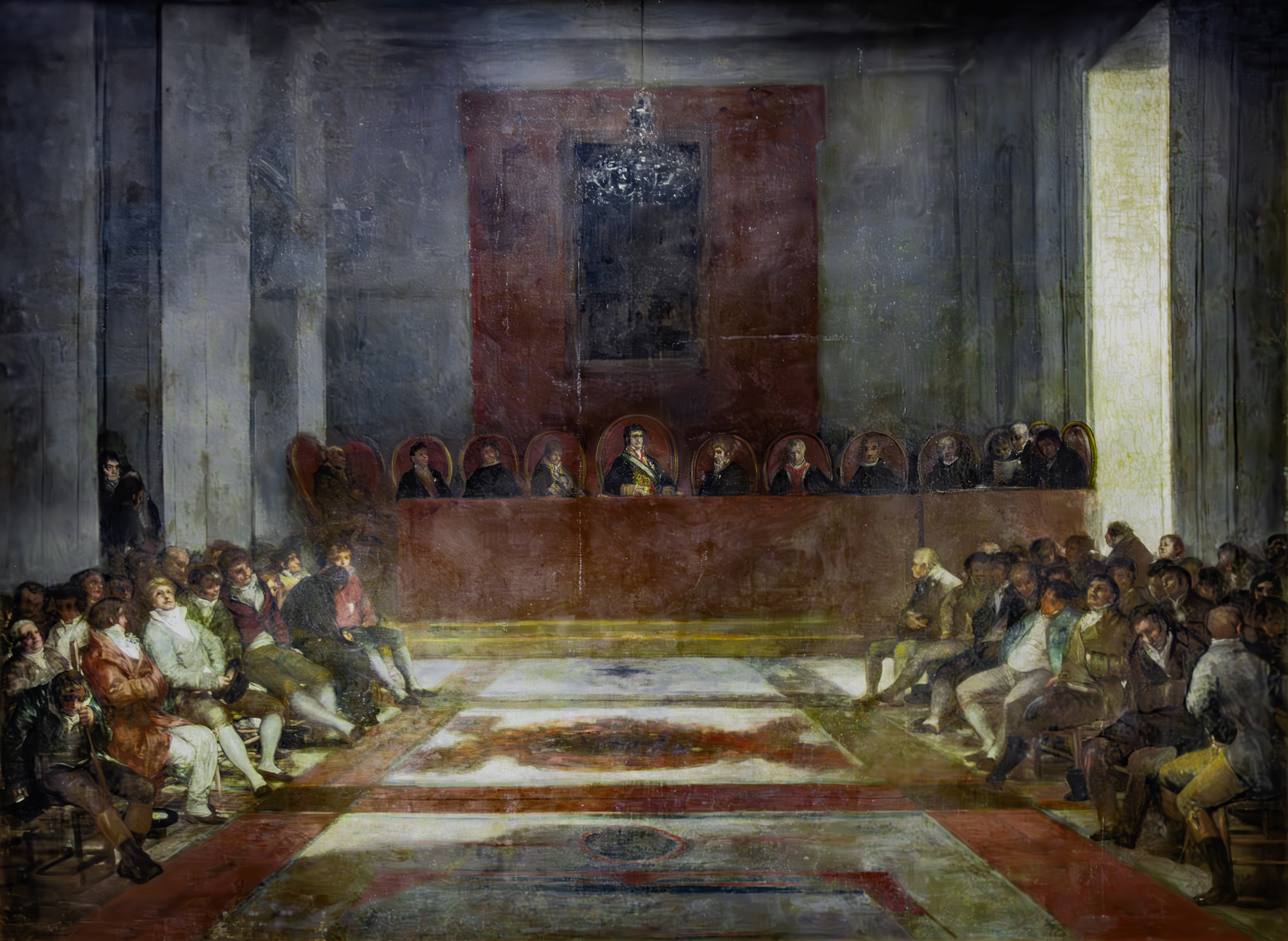
The Junta of the Philippines by Francisco Goya

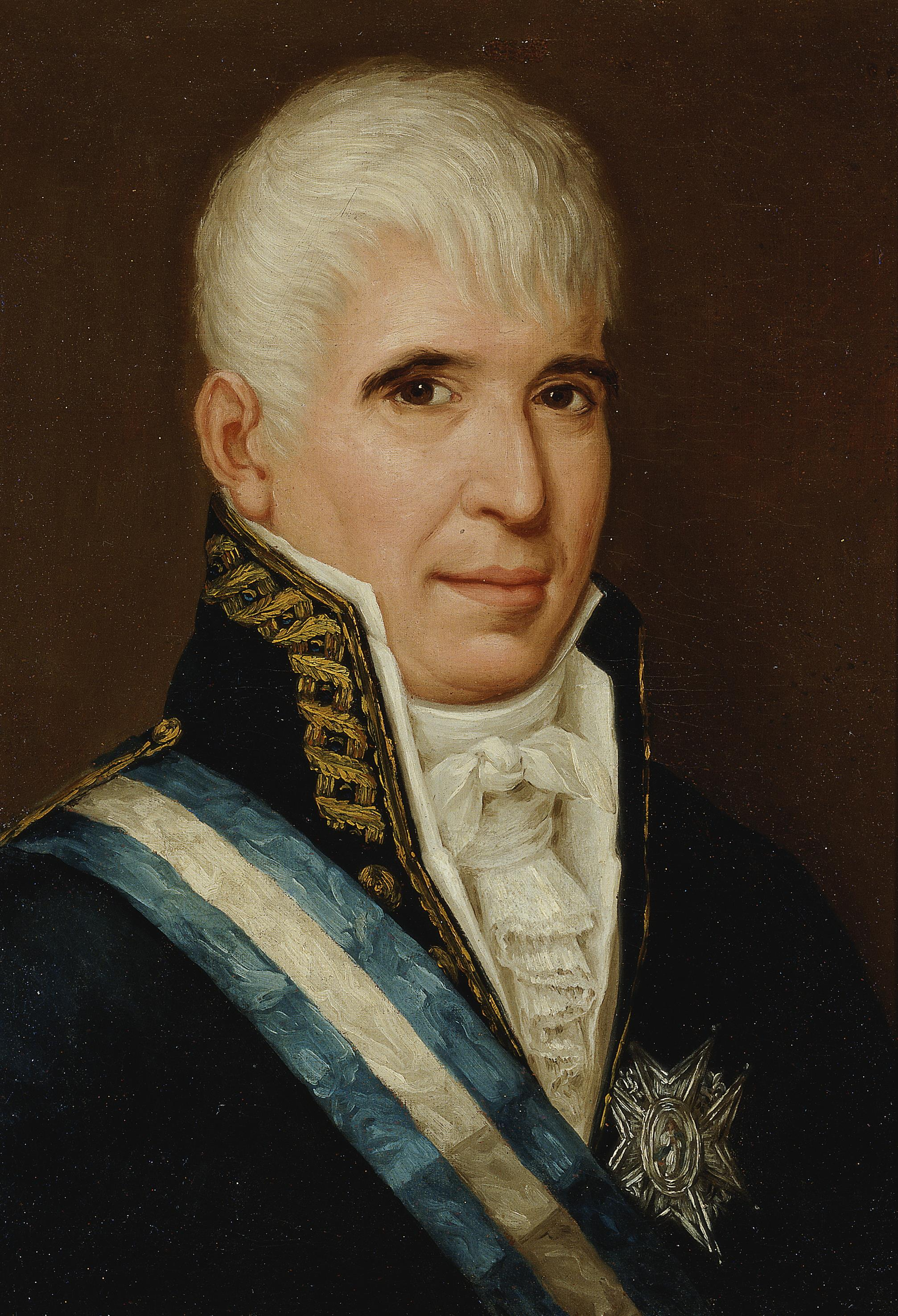
Francisco Saavedra, first president of the Junta of Seville.

The Supreme Central Junta was formed in September 1808 by delegates of the provincial juntas that had risen up against the French occupation after the Abdications of Bayonne, in which the House of Bourbon ceded the Spanish crown to Napoleon, who gave it to his brother Joseph Bonaparte. The Spanish government, including the Council of Castile, initially accepted Napoleon's decision to grant the Spanish crown to his brother Joseph. The Spanish population, however, almost uniformly rejected Napoleon's plans and expressed this opposition through the local municipal and provincial governments. Following traditional Spanish political theories, which held that the monarchy was a contract between the monarch and the people (see Philosophy of Law of Francisco Suárez), local governments responded to the crisis by transforming themselves into ad hoc governmental juntas (Spanish for "council", "committee", or "board").

The formation of provincial juntas, however, created new problems, since there was no central authority and many juntas rejected the claim of others to speak for the monarchy as a whole. The Junta of Seville, in particular, claimed authority over the overseas territories, citing the city's historic role in the administration of trade with the Indies. Recognising that unity was needed to coordinate resistance against the French and to manage British aid, several provincial juntas, among them those of the Murcia, the Valencia, Seville and Castile and León, called for the creation of a central body. After negotiations between the juntas, in which the discredited Council of Castile also took part, the Supreme Central Junta was established at Aranjuez on 25 September 1808. It acted as a substitute for the absent king and the royal government, and it summoned representatives of the Spanish provinces and the overseas territories to an "Extraordinary and General Cortes of the Spanish Nation". This body was meant to serve both as the single legislature for the whole monarchy and as the assembly that would draft a constitution.

In the months following the uprising of May 1808, the British envoy Charles Stuart played a significant diplomatic role in Spain, seeking to encourage the creation of a central body to coordinate the resistance against Napoleon. As his government's representative to the provincial juntas, he was tasked with ensuring military and political cooperation with Britain and with overseeing the distribution of the British aid—weapons, ammunition and funds—that was beginning to reach the country. Stuart maintained contacts with the juntas of Galicia, Asturias, Seville and others, mediating to reduce rivalries and promoting a centralised government that would facilitate coordination with the expeditionary army of the Duke of Wellington. Although his work coincided with the negotiations that led to the formation of the Supreme Central Junta in September 1808, the Junta was a Spanish creation, with Stuart acting as a facilitator and guarantor of British support. London's immediate recognition of the Junta and its promise of continued support strengthened its international legitimacy.

== Activities ==
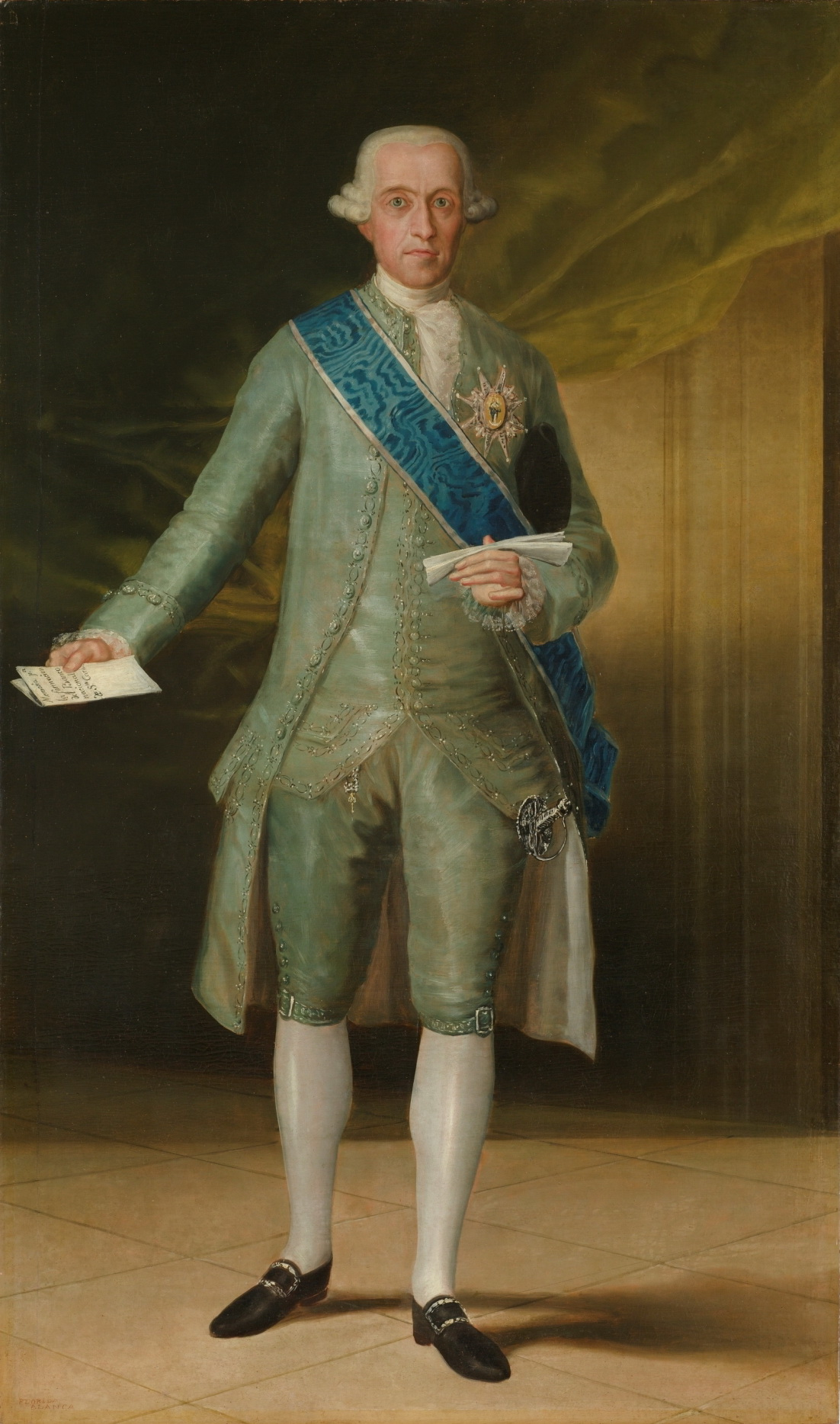
José Moñino, 1st Count of Floridablanca, painted by Goya. First President of the Central Junta of the Kingdom.

As agreed to in the negotiations, the Supreme Central Junta was composed of two representatives chosen by the juntas of the capitals of the peninsular kingdoms of the Spanish Monarchy. Early on, the Junta rejected the idea of establishing a regency, which would have meant the concentration of executive power in a small number of persons, and assumed that role, claiming the treatment of "Majesty" for itself.

The Junta was forced to abandon Madrid in November 1808 and resided at the Alcázar of Seville from 16 December 1808 until 23 January 1810. (Hence the appellation of "Junta of Seville", not to be confused with the earlier provincial junta.)

The Junta took over direction of the war effort and established war taxes, organized an Army of La Mancha and signed a treaty of alliance with the United Kingdom on 14 January 1809. As it became apparent that the war would last longer than initially thought, the Junta again took up the issue of convening a Cortes in April 1809 and issued a royal decree to the effect on 22 May. A committee presided by Gaspar Melchor de Jovellanos organized the legal and logistical efforts to carry this out.

The Junta also agreed that the "overseas kingdoms" would send one representative. These "kingdoms" were defined as "the viceroyalties of New Spain, Peru, New Kingdom of Granada, and Buenos Aires, and the independent captaincies general of the island of Cuba, Puerto Rico, Guatemala, Chile, Province of Venezuela, and Philippines" in the Junta's royal order of 22 January 1809. This scheme was criticized in America for providing unequal representation to the overseas territories. Several important and large cities were left without direct representation in the Supreme Central Junta. In particular Quito and Charcas, which saw themselves as the capitals of kingdoms, resented being subsumed in the larger "kingdom" of Peru. This unrest led to the establishment of juntas in these cities in 1809, which were eventually quashed by the authorities within the year. (See, Luz de América and Bolivian War of Independence.) Nevertheless, throughout early 1809 the governments of the capitals of the viceroyalties and captaincies general elected representatives to the Junta, although none arrived in time to serve on it.

The war took a turn for the worse under the Junta's watch. By the beginning of 1810, Spanish forces had suffered serious military reverses—the Battle of Ocaña, the Battle of Alba de Tormes—in which the French not only inflicted large losses, but also took control of southern Spain and forced the government to retreat to Cádiz, the last redoubt available to it on Spanish soil. In light of this, the Central Junta dissolved itself on 29 January 1810 and set up a five-person Council of Regency of Spain and the Indies, charged with finalizing the convening the Cortes.

== Council of Regency of Spain and the Indies ==
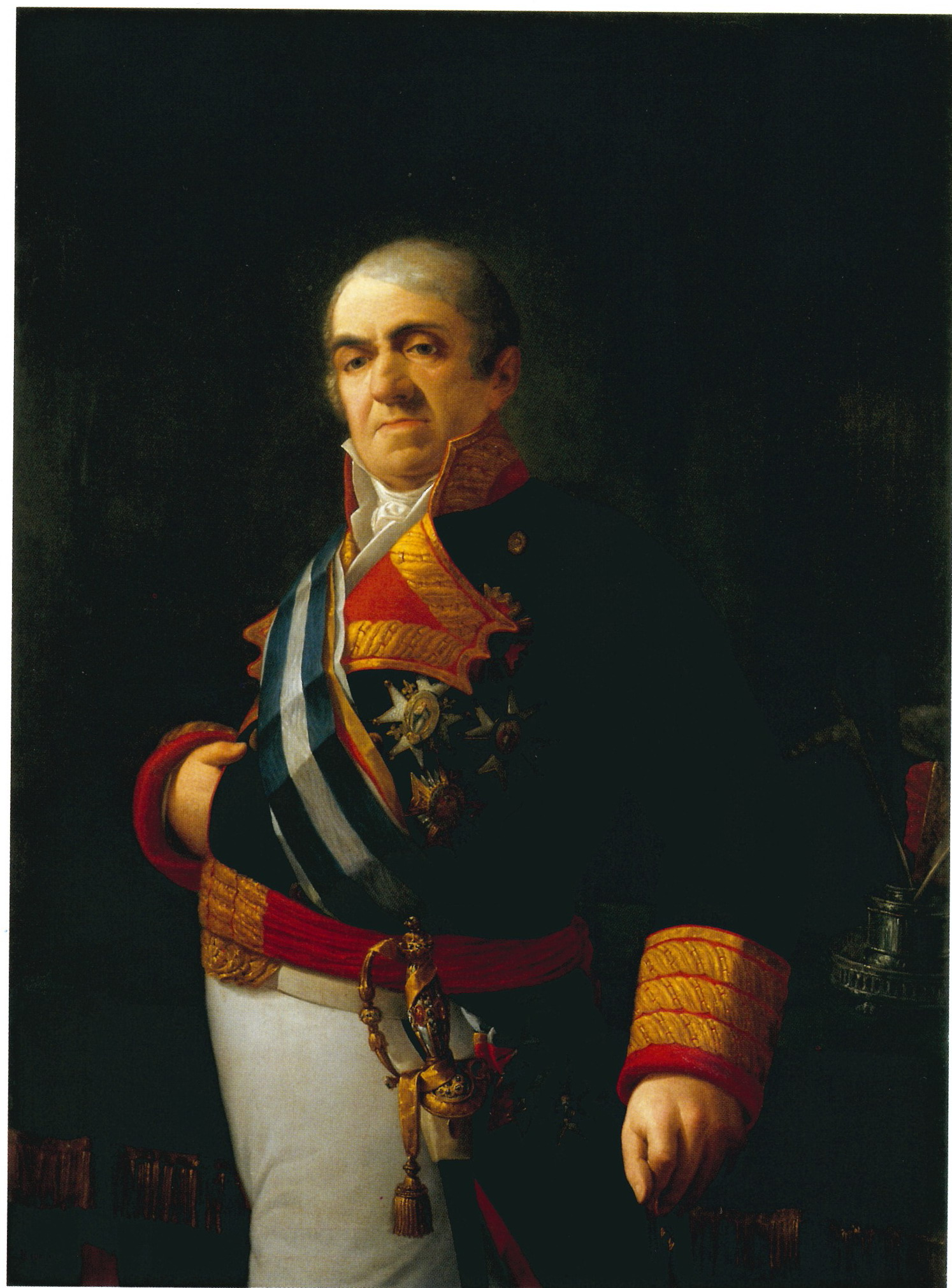
Francisco Javier Castaños, 1st Duke of Bailén, First president of the Regency of the Kingdom.

The Council of Regency of Spain and the Indies oversaw the almost complete recovery of the Spanish mainland and the formation of the Cortes of Cádiz, which drafted the Spanish Constitution of 1812. The Council was composed of General Francisco Javier Castaños; the councilors of state Antonio de Escaño; Francisco Saavedra and Esteban Fernández de León; and the Bishop of Orense, Pedro de Quevedo y Quintano, none of whom had served in the Supreme Central Junta. Fernández de León was replaced from the first day by Miguel de Lardizábal y Uribe—a substitute member of the Junta representing New Spain— for health reasons. Under its watch the Regency approved on a technicality the controversial decision to convene the Cortes as a unicameral body (the original royal decrees by the Junta had failed to mention the traditional estates). Once the Cortes began functioning on 24 September 1810, it assumed legislative powers and oversight of the Regency.

Junta movements were successful in New Granada (Colombia), Venezuela, Chile and Río de la Plata (Argentina). Less successful, though serious movements, also occurred in Central America. Although the juntas claimed to carry out their actions in the name of the deposed king, just as the peninsular juntas had done earlier, their creation provided an opportunity for people who favored outright independence to publicly and safely promote their agenda, triggering the twenty-five-year-long conflict that resulted in the emancipation of most of Spanish America.

== Members of the Junta (Spain) ==
Representatives of the Supreme Central Junta
Territory	Representatives
Aragon	Francisco Palafox y Melci; Lorenzo Calvo de Rozas
Asturias	Gaspar Melchor de Jovellanos; The Marqués de Camposagrado
Canary Islands	The Marqués de Villanueva del Prado
Old Castile	Lorenzo Bonifaz y Quintano; Francisco Javier Caro
Catalonia	The Marqués de Villel; The Barón de Sabasona
Cordova	The Marqués de la Puebla de los Infantes; Juan de Dios Gutiérrez Rabé
Extremadura	Martín de Garay; Félix Ovalle
Galicia	El Conde de Gimonde; Antonio Aballe
Granada	Rodrigo Riquelme; Luis de Funes
Jaen	Francisco Castanedo; Sebastián de Jocano
Leon	Joaquín Flórez-Osorio y Teijeiro de la Carrera, Vizconde de Quintanilla de Florez; Antonio Valdés y Fernández Bazán
Madrid	Vicente Osorio de Moscoso, 11th Count of Altamira; Pedro de Silva
Majorca	Tomás de Verí; The Conde de Ayamans
Murcia	The Count of Floridablanca; The Marqués del Villar
Navarre	Miguel de Balanza; Carlos de Amatria
Seville	Juan de Vera y Delgado, Archbishop of Laodicea and later Bishop of Cádiz (served as president of the Junta Central); The Conde de Tilly
Toledo	Pedro de Ribero; José García de la Torre
Valencia	The Conde de Contamina; Pedro Caro y Sureda, Marqués de la Romana
Porter of the Junta	Lorenzo Bonavia

== Members of the Junta (the Indias) ==
The Royal Order of 22 January 1809 established ten overseas constituencies, comprising the four viceroyalties of New Spain, Peru, New Granada and Buenos Aires, and the captaincies general of Cuba, Puerto Rico, Guatemala, Chile, Venezuela and the Philippines, each entitled to elect one representative to the Supreme Central Junta.

Overseas representation in the Supreme Central Junta
Territory	Elected representative	Travel to Spain / participation
New Spain	Miguel de Lardizábal y Uribe	Already residing in Spain
Peru	José de Silva y Olave	Did not arrive
New Granada	Antonio de Narváez y la Torre	Did not arrive
Río de la Plata (Buenos Aires)	Process not completed before the dissolution of the Junta	—
Cuba	Process not completed before the dissolution of the Junta	—
Puerto Rico	Ramón Power y Giralt	Travelled to Spain; later served in the Cortes of Cádiz
Guatemala	Process not completed before the dissolution of the Junta	—
Chile	Process not completed before the dissolution of the Junta	—
Venezuela	Joaquín de Mosquera y Figueroa	Elected, but did not join the Junta before its dissolution
Philippines	Process not completed before the dissolution of the Junta	—

== See also ==
- Cortes of Cádiz
- Spain under Joseph Bonaparte

== Bibliography ==
- Robertson, William Spence. "The Juntas of 1808 and the Spanish Colonies," English Historical Review (1916) 31#124, pp. 573-585. in JSTOR
- (in Spanish) Artola, Miguel. La España de Fernando VII. Madrid: Espasa-Calpe, 1999. ISBN 84-239-9742-1
- Lovett, Gabriel. Napoleon and the Birth of Modern Spain. New York: New York University Press, 1965.
