= Labranzagrande =

Coordinates: 5°34′N 72°34′W

- Municipality and town
- Flag Seal

- Location of the municipality and town of Labranzagrande in the Boyacá Department of Colombia.
- Country: Colombia
- Department: Boyacá Department
- Province: La Libertad Province

Government
  - Mayor: Érica Paola Peña Álvarez (2020-2023)
- Time zone: UTC-5 (Colombia Standard Time)

Labranzagrande is a town and municipality in the Colombian department of Boyacá, part of the subregion of the La Libertad Province.
