= Gabriel de Avilés, 4th Marquis of Avilés =

Spanish military officer and colonial administrator

Don Gabriel de Avilés Marquis of Avilés
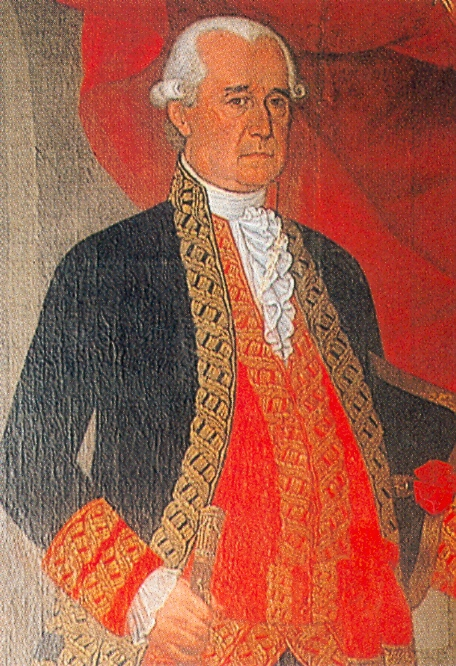

37th Viceroy of Peru
- In office November 5, 1801 – August 20, 1806
- Monarch: Charles IV
- Prime Minister: Manuel de Godoy
- Preceded by: Manuel Arredondo
- Succeeded by: José de Abascal

Viceroy of Río de la Plata
- In office March 14, 1799 – May 20, 1801
- Monarch: Charles IV
- Prime Minister: Count of Floridablanca
- Preceded by: Antonio Olaguer Feliú
- Succeeded by: Joaquín del Pino

Royal Governor of Chile
- In office September 18, 1796 – January 21, 1799
- Monarch: Charles IV
- Prime Minister: Count of Floridablanca
- Preceded by: José de Rezabal
- Succeeded by: Joaquín del Pino

Personal details
- Born: c. 1735 Vic, Spain
- Died: September 19, 1810 (aged 74–75) Valparaíso, Chile
- Spouse: Mercedes del Risco
- Profession: Lieutenant General

Gabriel de Avilés y del Fierro, 4th Marquis of Avilés (Spanish: Gabriel de Avilés y del Fierro, cuarto Marqués de Avilés) (c. 1735 – September 19, 1810) was a Spanish military officer and colonial administrator in the Americas. He was governor of Chile, viceroy of Río de la Plata, and viceroy of Peru.

== Early life ==
Gabriel de Avilés was born in Vic in the province of Barcelona, the son of José de Avilés, 1st Marquis of Avilés, intendente of Aragon and Valencia, and of Carmen del Fierro. He entered the military at a young age. He was sent to Chile as a cavalry instructor in 1768. After two years at Arauco, he was sent to Peru as subinspector general of the army. He married Mercedes del Risco y Ciudad, a Peruvian woman with a reputation for such kindness that she is known to history as la santa virreina.

== In Peru ==
In 1780, the anti-Spanish revolt of Túpac Amaru II erupted. The rebels had initial successes, and there were fears that the insurrection would engulf the entire viceroyalty. Avilés, then a colonel, was sent with a Spanish force to the defense of Cusco. The reinforcements arrived the day before the rebels began a siege of the city. The rebel force was estimated to be as many as 60,000 men. The situation was not easy for the Spanish; they feared not only the besieging force, but also the possibility of an uprising of the Indigenous within the city itself.

Nevertheless, the resistance was successful. Túpac Amaru was forced to raise the siege and retreat to Tungasuca. Viceroy Agustín de Jáuregui sent a force of 22,000 men in pursuit. Túpac Amaru was defeated, betrayed, captured, and subsequently brutally executed, along with his family.

For his part in putting down the rebellion, in 1785 Avilés was promoted to brigadier and made governor of Callao.

He remained in Peru until 1795, when he was promoted to lieutenant general and sent back to Chile, this time as governor.

== As Governor of Chile ==
He took up the position in September 1795, replacing Ambrosio O'Higgins. (José de Rezabal y Ugarte had held the position briefly in between.)

In Santiago Avilés rebuilt the Hospital San Juan de Dios. He reopened the old Jesuit college of San Pablo, as an asylum for paupers. He and the cabildo (city council) of Santiago worked together to improve the bridge works on the Mapocho River, the paving of the streets, and the beautifying, cleaning and security of the city. The capital got its first public lighting. The governor toured the colony and ordered the construction of churches and public works in many places.

Avilés supported Licenciado Manuel de Salas in his projects of stimulating the production of linen and the foundation of the Academy of San Luis (1797).

During his term the Tribunal del Consulado was established. This was a tribunal to decide commercial and industrial disputes.

Avilés remained as governor only until October 1796, when he was posted to Buenos Aires as viceroy of Río de la Plata.

Coat of arms of Gabriel de Avilés, marquess of Avilés, used as Viceroy of the Río de la Plata.

== As Viceroy of Río de la Plata ==
He was viceroy in Buenos Aires until 1801, when he was promoted to viceroy of Peru.

== As Viceroy of Peru ==
Once again he replaced Ambrosio O'Higgins. (Manuel Arredondo y Pelegrín, president of the Audiencia of Lima had held the position on an interim basis, pending Avilés's arrival.)

At the end of his mandate in 1806 he remained in Lima for some years. In 1810, he embarked for Spain, via the Strait of Magellan. He became seriously ill and was forced to stop in Valparaíso, where he died on September 19, 1810.

Avilés had a reputation as a man of good character, kind and pious.

== Notes ==
Government offices
| Preceded by José de Rezabal | Royal Governor of Chile; 1796–1799 | Succeeded by Joaquín del Pino |
| Preceded by Antonio Olaguer Feliú | Viceroy of Río de la Plata; 1799–1801 | Succeeded by Joaquín del Pino |
| Preceded by Manuel Arredondo | Viceroy of Peru; 1801–1806 | Succeeded by José de Abascal |
Spanish nobility
| Preceded by Miguel de Avilés | Marquis of Avilés; 1785–1810 | Succeeded by Ramón de Avilés |
