= 2023 Granada Open =

Padel championships

- Date: 11 April – 16 April
- Edition: 4th
- Category: Open 1000
- Location: Granada, Spain
- Venue: Palacio de los Deportes de Granada

Champions
- Men's doubles: (Argentina) Agustín Tapia (Spain) Arturo Coello
- Women's doubles: (Spain) Ariana Sánchez (Spain) Paula Josemaría

Chronology

The WPT Granada Open 2023 (officially WPT Cervezas Victoria Granada Open 1000 2023) was the fifth tournament of the eleventh edition of World Padel Tour. The final phase was played between April 11 and 16, 2023 at the facilities of the Granada Sports Palace, while the preliminary phase was played between March 8 and 11.

In the women's category, Ariana Sánchez and Paula Josemaría defeated Alejandra Salazar and Gemma Triay in the final by 6–2 and 7–6, thus regaining the number 1 ranking.

In the men's category, the "Golden Boys" Arturo Coello and Agustín Tapia won the tournament after defeating the "Superpibes" Franco Stupaczuk and Martín Di Nenno in the final by 6–4 and 7–5. Thus, the Spanish-Argentine duo remained undefeated in 2023 on WPT; they had now won 22 consecutive matches and 5 tournaments out of a possible 5.

== Relevant data ==
=== Back after 2018 ===
Five years later, the Andalusian city of Granada once again hosted a World Padel Tour tournament, this time to kick off the 2023 regular season in Spain after the three tournaments of the American tour and the 2023 Abu Dhabi Master. The tournament presentation featured two local professional players, Lucía Martínez and Javi Ruiz.

== Registered teams ==
Male

Rnk.	Team	WPT Ranking Points
1	(Argentina) Agustín Tapia (Spain) Arturo Coello	27.505
2	(Argentina) Fernando Belasteguín (Argentina) Sanyo Gutiérrez	18.405
3	(Argentina) Franco Stupaczuk (Argentina) Martín Di Nenno	17.645
4	(Argentina) Federico Chingotto (Spain) Paquito Navarro	13.800
5	(Spain) Alex Ruiz (Argentina) Juan Tello	12.545
6	(Spain) Coki Nieto (Brazil) Pablo Lima	10.671
7	(Spain) Momo González (Spain) Miguel Yanguas	9.607
8	(Brazil) Lucas Campagnolo (Argentina) Maxi Sánchez	7.580
9	(Argentina) Agustín Gutiérrez (Argentina) Lucho Capra	6.831
10	(Spain) José García Diestro (Spain) Pincho Fernández	6.274
11	(Spain) Javi Garrido (Spain) Jon Sanz	6.118
12	(Spain) Gonzalo Rubio (Spain) Javier Ruiz	5.544
13	(Spain) Francisco Gil (Argentina) Ramiro Moyano	4.459
14	(Spain) Iván Ramírez (Spain) Josete Rico	4.233
15	(Brazil) Lucas Bergamini (Spain) Víctor Ruiz	3.971
16	(Argentina) Miguel Lamperti (Argentina) Valentino Libaak	3.860
17	(Spain) Javier Leal (Argentina) Juan Cruz Belluati	3.644
18	(Spain) Eduardo Alonso (Spain) Juanlu Esbri	3.513
19	(Spain) Alejandro Arroyo (Spain) Pablo Cardona	3.268
20	(Spain) Javier García Mora (Spain) Javier González Barahona	3.174
21	(Argentina) Agustín Gomez Silingo (Spain) Juan Martín Díaz	3.091
22	(Spain) Javi Rico (Argentina) Leo Augsburger	2.990
23	(Spain) Josete Rico (Spain) Salvador Oria	2.902
24	(Spain) Marc Quílez (Spain) Toni Bueno	2.860
25	(Spain) Ignacio Vilariño (Spain) Jaime Muñoz	2.681
26	(Spain) Antón Sans (Spain) Teodoro Zapata	2.501
27	(Spain) Mario del Castillo (Spain) Miguel Benítez	2.297
28	(Spain) Raúl Marcos (Spain) Sergio Alba	2.179
Qualified from the preliminary rounds
A	(Spain) Enrique Goenaga (Spain) Jairo Bautista	1.408
B	(Spain) Boris Castro (Spain) Pol Hernández	620
C	(Spain) Daniel Santigosa (Spain) David Gala	898
D	(Argentina) Alex Chozas (Chile) Javier Valdés	655

Female

Rnk.	Team	WPT Ranking Points
1	(Spain) Alejandra Salazar (Spain) Gemma Triay	36.860
2	(Spain) Ariana Sánchez (Spain) Paula Josemaría	35.270
3	(Spain) Bea González (Argentina) Delfina Brea	12.764
4	(Spain) Marta Ortega (Portugal) Sofia Araújo	12.365
5	(Argentina) Aranza Osoro (Spain) Lucía Sainz	11.707
6	(Spain) Patty Llaguno (Spain) Victoria Iglesias	11.383
7	(Spain) Tamara Icardo (Argentina) Virginia Riera	10.569
8	(Spain) Majo Sánchez Alayeto (Spain) Mapi Sánchez Alayeto	8.945
9	(Argentina) Claudia Jensen (Spain) Jessica Castelló	8.120
10	(Spain) Lucía Martínez (Spain) Verónica Virseda	7.183
11	(Spain) Lorena Rufo (Spain) Marta Talaván	4.985
12	(Spain) Alejandra Alonso (France) Alix Collombon	3.580
13	(Sweden) Carolina Navarro (Spain) Mª Carmen Villalba	3.536
14	(Spain) Marina Guinart (Spain) Nuria Rodríguez	3.466
15	(Spain) Beatriz Caldera (Spain) Carmen Goenaga	3.433
16	(Spain) Claudia Fernández (Argentina) Julieta Bidahorria	3.347
17	(Spain) Carla Mesa (Spain) Lara Arruabarrera	3.129
18	(Spain) Marta Barrera (Spain) Marta Caparrós	3.085
19	(Spain) Eli Amatriaín (Spain) Sofía Saiz	2.886
20	(Spain) Araceli Martínez (Spain) Noa Cánovas	2.861
21	(Portugal) Ana Catarina Nogueira (Spain) Melania Merino	2.782
22	(Spain) Marina Martínez (Spain) Teresa Navarro	2.639
23	(Italy) Carolina Orsi (France) Léa Godallier	2.605
24	(Spain) Esther Carnicero (Spain) Marta Borrero	2.485
Qualified from the preliminary rounds
A	(Spain) Lourdes Pascual (Spain) Raquel Segura	1.391
B	(Spain) Jimena Velasco (Spain) Sara Pujals	1.971
C	(Spain) Águeda Pérez (Spain) Sara Ruiz	2.053
D	(Spain) Martina Fassio (Spain) Marina Pinacho	801

Teams missing

Rnk.	Teams	WPT Ranking Points	Reason
1	(Spain) Alejandro Galán (Spain) Juan Lebrón	34.830	(Note: Galán suffered a "muscle tear in his leg".)

== Schedule ==
The matches begin on Saturday with the qualifying rounds:

- Saturday, August 8: Men's qualifying rounds 1 and 2.
- Sunday, August 9: Men's qualifying round 3.
- Monday, August 10: Men's qualifying round 2 and women's qualifying rounds 1 and 2.

The main draw was played two weeks later:

- Tuesday, August 11: Round of 32 and women's qualifying round 2.
- Wednesday, August 12: Round of 32.
- Thursday, August 13: Round of 16.
- Friday, August 14: Quarterfinals.
- Saturday, August 15: Semifinals.
- Sunday, August 16: Finals.

== Results ==
=== Men's Bracket ===
Round of 32
1	(Spain) Coello / (Argentina) Tapia	7	6
(Spain) Josete Rico / (Spain) Ivan R.	6	4
(Spain) Javi Leal / (Argentina) Belluati	6	7
(Argentina) Lamperti / (Argentina) Libaak	4	6
(Spain) Xisco Gil / (Argentina) Moyano	6	6
(Spain) A. Sans / (Spain) T. Zapata	2	3
(Spain) Víctor R. / (Brazil) Bergamini	5	4
7	(Spain) Momo / (Spain) Yanguas	7	6
5	(Spain) Alex / (Argentina) Tello	6	7
(Spain) Pincho / (Spain) J.G. Diestro	4	5
(Spain) A. Arroyo / (Spain) P. Cardona	6	6
(Spain) Boris Castro / (Spain) Pol Hdez (B)	2	0
(Argentina) A. Chozas / (Chile) J. Valdés (D)	3	1
(Argentina) A. Gutiérrez / (Argentina) Lucho	6	6
(Argentina) Augsburger / (Spain) Javi Rico	6	0
4	(Argentina) Chingotto / (Spain) Paquito	7	6
3	(Argentina) Stupa / (Argentina) Di Nenno	6	6
(Argentina) Silingo / (Spain) J.M. Díaz	2	2
(Spain) Benítez / (Spain) Del Castillo	7	3	6
(Spain) Edu Alonso / (Spain) J.L. Esbri	5	6	4
(Spain) Javi Ruiz / (Spain) G. Rubio	6	6	6
(Spain) Jorge Ruiz / (Spain) Salvador Oria	7	2	4
(Spain) Goenaga / (Spain) Bautista (A)	6	6
6	(Spain) Coki / (Brazil) Lima	4	2
8	(Argentina) Maxi / (Brazil) Campagnolo	6	6
(Spain) J. Muñoz / (Spain) Vilariño	4	4
(Spain) J.G. Mora / (Spain) J.G. Barahona	6	6
(Spain) R. Marcos / (Spain) S. Alba	4	2
(Spain) M. Quílez / (Spain) Toni Bueno	6	7
(Spain) Santigosa / (Spain) D. Gala (C)	3	6
(Spain) J. Garrido / (Spain) J. Sanz	W	O
2	(Argentina) Belasteguín / (Argentina) Sanyo

Round of 16
1	(Spain) Coello / (Argentina) Tapia	7	6
(Spain) Javi Leal / (Argentina) Belluati	5	3
(Spain) Xisco Gil / (Argentina) Moyano	7	6
7	(Spain) Momo / (Spain) Yanguas	6	2
5	(Spain) Alex / (Argentina) Tello	6	6
(Spain) A. Arroyo / (Spain) P. Cardona	2	2
(Argentina) A. Gutiérrez / (Argentina) Lucho	4	2
4	(Argentina) Chingotto / (Spain) Paquito	6	6
3	(Argentina) Stupa / (Argentina) Di Nenno	6	6
(Spain) Benítez / (Spain) Del Castillo	2	0
(Spain) G. Rubio / (Spain) Javi Ruiz	6	6
(Spain) Bautista / (Spain) Goenaga (A)	1	2
8	(Argentina) Maxi / (Brazil) Campagnolo	7	3	4
(Spain) J.G. Mora / (Spain) J.G. Barahona	6	6	6
(Spain) M. Quílez / (Spain) Toni Bueno	3	7	2
(Spain) J. Garrido / (Spain) J. Sanz	6	6	6

Quarter-Final
1	(Spain) Coello / (Argentina) Tapia	6	6
(Spain) Xisco Gil / (Argentina) Moyano	2	3
5	(Spain) Alex / (Argentina) Tello	6	6
4	(Argentina) Chingotto / (Spain) Paquito	1	3
3	(Argentina) Stupa / (Argentina) Di Nenno	7	6
(Spain) G. Rubio / (Spain) Javi Ruiz	6	1
(Spain) J.G. Mora / (Spain) J.G. Barahona	4	2
(Spain) J. Garrido / (Spain) J. Sanz	6	6

Semi-Finals
1	(Spain) Coello / (Argentina) Tapia	6	6
5	(Spain) Alex / (Argentina) Tello	2	3
3	(Argentina) Stupa / (Argentina) Di Nenno	6	6
(Spain) J. Garrido / (Spain) J. Sanz	4	2

Finals
1	(Spain) Coello / (Argentina) Tapia	6	7
3	(Argentina) Stupa / (Argentina) Di Nenno	4	5

=== Women's Bracket ===
Round of 32
1	(Spain) Salazar / (Spain) Triay
Bye
(Spain) Araceli / (Spain) Noa Cánovas	2	0
(Spain) Marina M. / (Spain) Teresa N.	6	6
(Spain) Carnicero / (Spain) M. Borrero	4	7	2
(Spain) Águeda / (Spain) Sara Ruiz (C)	6	6	6
(Spain) Lucía M. / (Spain) Virseda	4	1
7	(Spain) Tamara / (Argentina) Virginia R.	6	6
6	(Spain) Victoria / (Spain) Patty	7	6
(Spain) A. Alonso / (France) Collombon	6	3
(Spain) Guinart / (Spain) N. Rodríguez	6	7
(Spain) S. Pujals / (Spain) Velasco (B)	3	6
(Spain) L. Rufo / (Spain) Talaván	5	6	6
(Spain) M. Barrera / (Spain) M. Caparrós	7	4	1
Bye
3	(Spain) Bea G. / (Argentina) Delfi
4	(Spain) Martita / (Portugal) S. Araújo
Bye
(Spain) S. Saiz / (Spain) Amatriaín	3	0
(Spain) Caldera / (Spain) Goenaga	6	6
(Sweden) C. Navarro / (Spain) Villalba	1	6	1
(Spain) Castelló / (Argentina) Jensen	6	1	6
(Italy) C. Orsi / (France) Godallier	5	7	6
8	(Spain) Majo / (Spain) Mapi	7	6	2
5	(Argentina) Aranza / (Spain) Sainz	6	6
(Spain) Fassio / (Spain) Pinacho (D)	4	1
(Spain) Segura / (Spain) Pascual (A)	2	4
(Argentina) Bidahorria / (Spain) Claudia F.	6	6
(Spain) Arruabarrena / (Spain) C. Mesa	4	4
(Portugal) Nogueira / (Spain) Merino	6	6
Bye
2	(Spain) Ariana / (Spain) Paula

Round of 16
1	(Spain) Salazar / (Spain) Triay	6	6
(Spain) Marina M. / (Spain) Teresa N.	1	1
(Spain) Águeda / (Spain) Sara Ruiz (C)	2	1
7	(Spain) Tamara / (Argentina) Virginia R.	6	6
6	(Spain) Victoria / (Spain) Patty	4	4
(Spain) Guinart / (Spain) N. Rodríguez	6	6
(Spain) Talaván / (Spain) L. Rufo	6	3
3	(Spain) Bea G. / (Argentina) Delfi	7	6
4	(Spain) Martita / (Portugal) S. Araújo	7	6
(Spain) Caldera / (Spain) Goenaga	6	0
(Spain) Castelló / (Argentina) Jensen	6	6	6
(Italy) C. Orsi / (France) Godallier	7	4	3
5	(Argentina) Aranza / (Spain) Sainz	4	6	6
(Argentina) Bidahorria / (Spain) Claudia F.	6	1	3
(Spain) Merino / (Portugal) Nogueira	2	6	2
2	(Spain) Ariana / (Spain) Paula	6	4	6

Quarter-Final
1	(Spain) Salazar / (Spain) Triay	6	6
7	(Spain) Tamara / (Argentina) Virginia R.	3	1
(Spain) Guinart / (Spain) N. Rodríguez	5	2
3	(Spain) Bea G. / (Argentina) Delfi	7	6
4	(Spain) Martita / (Portugal) S. Araújo	6	6	3
(Spain) Castelló / (Argentina) Jensen	1	7	6
5	(Argentina) Aranza / (Spain) Sainz	6	2
2	(Spain) Ariana / (Spain) Paula	7	6

Semi-Finals
1	(Spain) Salazar / (Spain) Triay	3	6	6
3	(Spain) Bea G. / (Argentina) Delfi	6	4	1
(Spain) Castelló / (Argentina) Jensen	3	4
2	(Spain) Ariana / (Spain) Paula	6	6

Finals
1	(Spain) Salazar / (Spain) Triay	2	6
2	(Spain) Ariana / (Spain) Paula	6	7

=== Final qualifying round ===
Men's

Data	Qualified	WPT Ranking Point	Opponents	Result
A	(Spain) Enrique Goenaga (Spain) Jairo Bautista	1.408 vs 112	(Spain) Antonio Varo (Spain) José Luis González	7–5 / 6–2
B	(Spain) Boris Castro (Spain) Pol Hernández	620 vs 1.386	(Spain) Jaime Fermosell (Spain) Jose Jiménez	7–6 / 3–6 / 6–3
C	(Spain) Daniel Santigosa (Spain) David Gala	898 vs 582	(Spain) Diego Gil Batista (Spain) Ignacio Sager	6–4 / 6–3
D	(Argentina) Alex Chozas (Chile) Javier Valdés	655 vs 1.023	(Spain) Arnau Ayats (Spain) Pablo Castillo	7–6 / 7–6

Women's

Data	Qualified	WPT Ranking Point	Opponents	Result
A	(Spain) Lourdes Pascual (Spain) Raquel Segura	1.391 vs 2.430	(Spain) Arantxa Soriano (Spain) Alicia Blanco	7–5 / 6–2
B	(Spain) Jimena Velasco (Spain) Sara Pujals	1.971 vs 793	(Spain) Amanda Girdo (Spain) Helena Wyckaert	6–2 / 6–2
C	(Spain) Águeda Pérez (Spain) Sara Ruiz	2.053 vs 1.632	(Spain) Ana Fernandez De Ossó (Spain) Mª Eulalia Rodríguez	6–1 / 6–3
D	(Spain) Martina Fassio (Spain) Marina Pinacho	801 vs 2.197	(Spain) Lorena Alonso (Spain) Sandra Hernández	4–6 / 7–6 / 6–4

=== Round of 32 ===
Men's

Date	Team A	Score	Team B	Refs.
11/4/2023	(Spain) Javier García Mora (Spain) Javier González Barahona	6–4 / 6–2	(Spain) Raúl Marcos (Spain) Sergio Alba	
11/4/2023	(Brazil) Lucas Campagnolo (Argentina) Maxi Sánchez	6–4 / 6–4	(Spain) Ignacio Vilariño (Spain) Jaime Muñoz	
11/4/2023	(Spain) Alex Ruiz (Argentina) Juan Tello	4–6 / 7–5	(Spain) José García Diestro (Spain) Pincho Fernández	
11/4/2023	(Argentina) Franco Stupaczuk (Argentina) Martín Di Nenno	6–2 / 6–2	(Argentina) Agustín Gomez Silingo (Argentina) Juan Martín Díaz	
11/4/2023	(Argentina) Alex Chozas (Chile) Javier Valdés	3–6 / 1–6	(Argentina) Agustín Gutiérrez (Argentina) Lucho Capra	
11/4/2023	(Spain) Alejandro Arroyo (Spain) Pablo Cardona	6–2 / 6–0	(Spain) Boris Castro (Spain) Pol Hernández	
11/4/2023	(Spain) Javi Rico (Argentina) Leo Augsburger	6–7 / 0–6	(Argentina) Federico Chingotto (Spain) Paquito Navarro	
11/4/2023	(Spain) Gonzalo Rubio (Spain) Javier Ruiz	6–7 / 6–2 / 6–4	(Spain) Josete Rico (Spain) Salvador Oria	
12/4/2023	(Spain) Enrique Goenaga (Spain) Jairo Bautista	6–4 / 6–2	(Spain) Coki Nieto (Brazil) Pablo Lima	
12/4/2023	(Spain) Mario del Castillo (Spain) Miguel Benítez	7–5 / 3–6 / 6–4	(Spain) Eduardo Alonso (Spain) Juanlu Esbri	
12/4/2023	(Spain) Marc Quílez (Spain) Toni Bueno	6–3 / 7–6	(Spain) Daniel Santigosa (Spain) David Gala	
12/4/2023	(Spain) Francisco Gil (Argentina) Ramiro Moyano	6–2 / 6–3	(Spain) Antón Sans (Spain) Teodoro Zapata	
12/4/2023	(Argentina) Agustín Tapia (Spain) Arturo Coello	7–6 / 6–4	(Spain) Iván Ramírez (Spain) Josete Rico	
12/4/2023	(Spain) Javier Leal (Argentina) Juan Cruz Belluati	6–4 / 7–6	(Argentina) Miguel Lamperti (Argentina) Valentino Libaak	
12/4/2023	(Brazil) Lucas Bergamini (Spain) Víctor Ruiz	5–7 / 4–6	(Spain) Momo González (Spain) Miguel Yanguas	
—	(Spain) Javier Garrido (Spain) Jon Sanz		(Argentina) Fernando Belasteguín (Argentina) Sanyo Gutiérrez	W.O.

Women's

Date	Team A	Score	Team B	Refs.
12/4/2023	(Spain) Patty Llaguno (Spain) Victoria Iglesias	7–6 / 6–3	(Spain) Alejandra Alonso (France) Alix Collombon	
12/4/2023	(Italy) Carolina Orsi (France) Léa Godallier	5–7 / 7–6 / 6–2	(Spain) Majo Sánchez Alayeto (Spain) Mapi Sánchez Alayeto	
12/4/2023	(Spain) Lorena Rufo (Spain) Marta Talaván	5–7 / 6–4 / 6–1	(Spain) Marta Barrera (Spain) Marta Caparrós	
12/4/2023	(Spain) Marina Guinart (Spain) Nuria Rodríguez	6–3 / 7–6	(Spain) Jimena Velasco (Spain) Sara Pujals	
12/4/2023	(Sweden) Carolina Navarro (Spain) Mª Carmen Villalba	1–6 / 6–1 / 1–6	(Argentina) Claudia Jensen (Spain) Jessica Castelló	
12/4/2023	(Argentina) Aranza Osoro (Spain) Lucía Sainz	6–4 / 6–1	(Spain) Martina Fassio (Spain) Marina Pinacho	
12/4/2023	(Spain) Araceli Martínez (Spain) Noa Cánovas	2–6 / 0–6	(Spain) Marina Martínez (Spain) Teresa Navarro	
12/4/2023	(Spain) Eli Amatriaín (Spain) Sofía Saiz	3–6 / 0–6	(Spain) Beatriz Caldera (Spain) Carmen Goenaga	
12/4/2023	(Spain) Lucía Martínez (Spain) Verónica Virseda	4–6 / 1–6	(Spain) Tamara Icardo (Argentina) Virginia Riera	
12/4/2023	(Spain) Lourdes Pascual (Spain) Raquel Segura	2–6 / 4–6	(Spain) Claudia Fernández (Argentina) Julieta Bidahorria	
12/4/2023	(Spain) Carla Mesa (Spain) Lara Arruabarrera	4–6 / 4–6	(Portugal) Ana Catarina Nogueira (Spain) Melania Merino	
12/4/2023	(Spain) Esther Carnicero (Spain) Marta Borrero	4–6 / 7–6 / 2–6	(Spain) Águeda Pérez (Spain) Sara Ruiz	

=== Round of 16 ===
Men's

Date	Team A	Score	Team B	Refs.
13/4/2023	(Brazil) Lucas Campagnolo (Argentina) Maxi Sánchez	7–6 / 3–6 / 4–6	(Spain) Javier García Mora (Spain) Javier González Barahona	
13/4/2023	(Argentina) Franco Stupaczuk (Argentina) Martín Di Nenno	6–2 / 6–0	(Spain) Mario del Castillo (Spain) Miguel Benítez	
13/4/2023	(Spain) Marc Quílez (Spain) Toni Bueno	3–6 / 7–6 / 2–6	(Spain) Javi Garrido (Spain) Jon Sanz	
13/4/2023	(Argentina) Agustín Gutiérrez (Argentina) Lucho Capra	4–6 / 2–6	(Argentina) Federico Chingotto (Spain) Paquito Navarro	
13/4/2023	(Spain) Francisco Gil (Argentina) Ramiro Moyano	7–6 / 6–2	(Spain) Momo González (Spain) Miguel Yanguas	
13/4/2023	(Spain) Alex Ruiz (Argentina) Juan Tello	6–2 / 6–2	(Spain) Alejandro Arroyo (Spain) Pablo Cardona	
13/4/2023	(Spain) Gonzalo Rubio (Spain) Javier Ruiz	6–1 / 6–2	(Spain) Enrique Goenaga (Spain) Jairo Bautista	
13/4/2023	(Argentina) Agustín Tapia (Spain) Arturo Coello	7–5 / 6–3	(Spain) Javier Leal (Argentina) Juan Cruz Belluati	

Women's

Date	Team A	Score	Team B	Refs.
13/4/2023	(Spain) Lorena Rufo (Spain) Marta Talaván	6–7 / 3–6	(Spain) Bea González (Argentina) Delfina Brea	
13/4/2023	(Spain) Patty Llaguno (Spain) Victoria Iglesias	4–6 / 4–6	(Spain) Marina Guinart (Spain) Nuria Rodríguez	
13/4/2023	(Argentina) Claudia Jensen (Spain) Jessica Castelló	6–7 / 6–4 / 6–3	(Italy) Carolina Orsi (France) Léa Godallier	
13/4/2023	(Spain) Alejandra Salazar (Spain) Gemma Triay	6–1 / 6–1	(Spain) Marina Martínez (Spain) Teresa Navarro	
13/4/2023	(Spain) Marta Ortega (Portugal) Sofia Araújo	7–6 / 6–0	(Spain) Beatriz Caldera (Spain) Carmen Goenaga	
13/4/2023	(Spain) Águeda Pérez (Spain) Sara Ruiz	2–6 / 1–6	(Spain) Tamara Icardo (Argentina) Virginia Riera	
13/4/2023	(Portugal) Ana Catarina Nogueira (Spain) Melania Merino	2–6 / 6–4 / 2–6	(Spain) Ariana Sánchez (Spain) Paula Josemaría	
13/4/2023	(Argentina) Aranza Osoro (Spain) Lucía Sainz	4–6 / 6–1 / 6–3	(Spain) Claudia Fernández (Argentina) Julieta Bidahorria	

=== Quarter-Finals ===
Men's

Date	Team A	Score	Team B	Refs.
14/4/2023	(Spain) Javier García Mora (Spain) Javier González Barahona	4–6 / 2–6	(Spain) Javi Garrido (Spain) Jon Sanz	
14/4/2023	(Argentina) Franco Stupaczuk (Argentina) Martín Di Nenno	7–6 / 6–1	(Spain) Gonzalo Rubio (Spain) Javier Ruiz	
14/4/2023	(Spain) Alex Ruiz (Argentina) Juan Tello	6–1 / 6–3	(Argentina) Federico Chingotto (Spain) Paquito Navarro	
14/4/2023	(Argentina) Agustín Tapia (Spain) Arturo Coello	6–2 / 6–3	(Spain) Francisco Gil (Argentina) Ramiro Moyano	

Women's

Date	Team A	Score	Team B	Refs.
14/4/2023	(Spain) Alejandra Salazar (Spain) Gemma Triay	6–3 / 6–1	(Spain) Tamara Icardo (Argentina) Virginia Riera	
14/4/2023	(Spain) Marina Guinart (Spain) Nuria Rodríguez	5–7 / 2–6	(Argentina) Delfina Brea (Spain) Bea González	
14/4/2023	(Spain) Lucía Sainz (Argentina) Aranza Osoro	6–7 / 2–6	(Spain) Ariana Sánchez (Spain) Paula Josemaría	
14/4/2023	(Spain) Marta Ortega (Portugal) Sofia Araújo	6–1 / 6–7 / 3–6	(Argentina) Claudia Jensen (Spain) Jessica Castelló	

=== Semifinals ===
Men's

Date	Team A	Score	Team B	Refs.
15/4/2023	(Argentina) Franco Stupaczuk (Argentina) Martín Di Nenno	6–4 / 6–2	(Spain) Javi Garrido (Spain) Jon Sanz	
15/4/2023	(Argentina) Agustín Tapia (Spain) Arturo Coello	6–2 / 6–3	(Spain) Alex Ruiz (Argentina) Juan Tello	

Women's

Date	Team A	Score	Team B	Refs.
15/4/2023	(Spain) Alejandra Salazar (Spain) Gemma Triay	3–6 / 6–4 / 6–1	(Spain) Bea González (Argentina) Delfina Brea	
15/4/2023	(Argentina) Claudia Jensen (Spain) Jessica Castelló	3–6 / 4–6	(Spain) Ariana Sánchez (Spain) Paula Josemaría	

=== Finals ===
Men's

Date	Team A	Score	Team B	Refs.
16/4/2023	(Argentina) Franco Stupaczuk (Argentina) Martín Di Nenno	4–6 / 5–7	(Argentina) Agustín Tapia (Spain) Arturo Coello	

Women's

Date	Team A	Score	Team B	Refs.
16/4/2023	(Spain) Alejandra Salazar (Spain) Gemma Triay	2–6 / 6–7	(Spain) Ariana Sánchez (Spain) Paula Josemaría	
