= Joaquín del Pino =

Spanish military engineer and politician

Don Joaquín del Pino
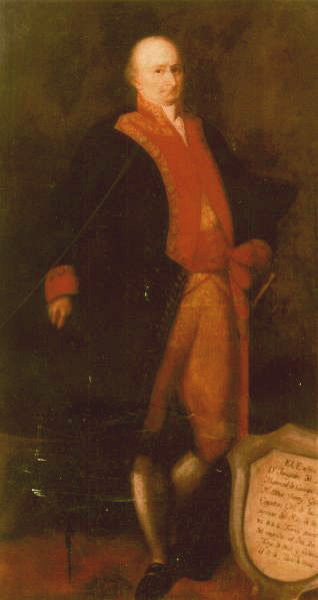

Viceroy of Río de la Plata
- In office May 20, 1801 – April 11, 1804
- Monarch: Charles IV
- Prime Minister: Manuel de Godoy
- Preceded by: The Marquis of Avilés
- Succeeded by: The Marquis of Sobremonte

Royal Governor of Chile
- In office February 1, 1799 – March 31, 1801
- Monarch: Charles IV
- Prime Minister: Count of Floridablanca
- Preceded by: The Marquis of Avilés
- Succeeded by: José de Santiago Concha

Royal Governor of Montevideo
- In office February 1, 1799 – March 31, 1801
- Monarch: Charles IV
- Prime Minister: Count of Floridablanca
- Preceded by: José de Rezabal
- Succeeded by: Joaquín del Pino

Personal details
- Born: January 20, 1729 Baena, Spain
- Died: April 11, 1804 (aged 75) Buenos Aires, Viceroyalty of the Río de la Plata (now Argentina)
- Spouse(s): María Ignacia Ramery Echarry (1763–1780) and Rafaela Francisca de Vera Mujica y López Pintado (1783–1804)
- Profession: Marshal

Joaquín del Pino Sánchez de Rojas Romero y Negrete (January 20, 1729 – April 11, 1804), was a Spanish military engineer and politician, who held various positions in the South American colonial administration.

== Early life ==
At the age of 18, he became a cadet in the regiment fixed Oran. Being already a sub-official, he studied mathematics and in February 1752 he moved to the Corps of Engineers. That same year he collaborated with Ampurdán mapping to perform fortifications and roads. In 1753, he was commissioned to supervision of the fortifications of the castle of Montjuic in Barcelona.

Even when working there in 1760 was promoted to captain in 1762, before the suspension of work was aimed at repairing the shore batteries of Castile in the war with Portugal. The following year he married Maria Ignacia Rameri, from San Sebastian. In 1769, he returned to be used for cartographic work, collaborating with the French in the lifting of military maps of Aldudes, between Navarre and France. Promoted to lieutenant colonel the following year was sent to Montevideo at the request of viceroy Juan José de Vértiz y Salcedo in 1771 to repair the ramparts of the citadel. He remained in South America until his death.

== As governor of Montevideo ==
He was governor of Montevideo from 1773 to 1790, president of the Audiencia of Chile from 1790 and 1795 and the Audiencia of Charcas between 1795 and 1799.

== As governor of Chile ==
He was entrusted with the government of Chile, serving from 1799 to 1801. In the latter year, by a certificate issued on 14 July 1800 in Madrid, was appointed viceroy of Río de la Plata, assuming the post on 20 May.

== As viceroy of Río de la Plata ==
Enlightened ruler, but true to the metropolis, carried out numerous public works, including the port expansion, construction of the Buenos Aires Recova entrusted to Juan Bautista Sigismund, who later became also the author of the Church of the Convent San Lorenzo and efficient administration promoted the construction of brick kilns and the building of shipyards in Corrientes and Assumption, to replace the foreign ships, which prohibited land, temporarily ending the export of raw hides common to that time. Also limited the movement of foreigners, fearing the establishment of republican ideas of the French Revolution, and closed the first newspaper published in Buenos Aires, The Telegraph Commercial (1801).

In 1801 gave the first tasks of responsibility to Santiago de Liniers, appointing him governor of Misiones. He tried to take advantage of the situation to regain the Seven Peoples Missions East overrun by the Portuguese in Brazil since the beginning of the year, taking the Luso-Hispanic war as an excuse; del Pino, however, failed to provide the necessary supplies, and loss of missions and would Guayrá unpardonable. On July 6, 1802 he would be removed from office for it, naming as his replacement for Antonio Amar, but the relay was suspended in view of his age.

Already seventy, he fell ill in April 1804, and died ten days later, leaving Rafael de Sobremonte as his appointed successor. A few years later her daughter, Juana del Pino be married with the future president Bernardino Rivadavia.

== Additional information ==
=== See also ===
- Bernardino Rivadavia
- Santiago de Liniers

=== Sources ===
- Barros Arana, Diego (1886). Historia Jeneral de Chile (in Spanish). Vol. VI. Santiago, Chile: Rafael Jover. ISBN 9780598482334.
- Gay, Claudio (1848). Historia física y política de Chile (1749–1808) (in Spanish). Vol. IV. Paris, France: En casa del autor. p. 506.
- Medina, José Toribio (1906). Diccionario Biográfico Colonial de Chile (PDF) (in Spanish). Santiago, Chile: Imprenta Elzeviriana. pp. 688–689.

Government offices
Preceded by José Joaquín de Viana	Governor of Montevideo; 1773–1790	Succeeded by Antonio Olaguer
Preceded by The Marquis of Avilés	Royal Governor of Chile; 1799–1801	Succeeded by José de Santiago Concha
Preceded by The Marquis of Avilés	Viceroy of Río de la Plata; 1801–1804	Succeeded by The Marquis of Sobremonte
