= Azcuénaga =

Azcuénaga or Azcuenaga is a surname found in Argentina and the United States. Notable people with this surname include:

- Ana de Azcuénaga de Olaguer Feliú (1770 – 1845), a vicereine of Río de la Plata, born in Argentina
- Flora Azcuénaga (1767 – 1850), an Argentinian philanthropist
- Mary Azcuenaga (born 1945), an American attorney
- Miguel de Azcuénaga (1754 – 1833), an Argentine brigadier
- Vicente de Azcuénaga (1706 – 1707), an Argentine businessman and politician
