= José Joaquín de Viana =

Spanish military and political figure

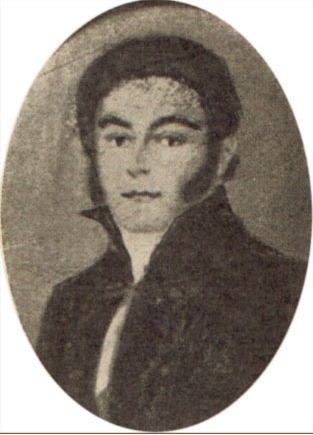
José Joaquín de Viana

José Joaquín de Viana (1718–1773) was a Spanish military and political figure, Governor of Montevideo between 1751 and 1764 and between 1771 and 1773.

== Biography ==
Of Navarrese origin, Viana started his military career in 1735 and fought in Italy during the War of the Austrian Succession (1740–1748), reaching the rank of colonel. On his return from that campaign, he was named first governor of Montevideo by King Ferdinand VI of Spain, in 1750, taking office in that city on March 14, 1751. The following month he faced a revolt of the Charruas Indians, who were defeated at the Battle of Tacuarí on 16 April.

Viana's appointment took place in the course of certain political circumstances in the Río de la Plata by the Treaty of Madrid in 1750, by which the government of Fernando VI ceded to Portugal the Jesuit missions of upper Uruguay, in exchange for the delivery of Colonia del Sacramento. This fact is part of the second pacifist policy of the Spanish Bourbons, who tried to approach Portugal diplomatically to end the border disputes at various points in the Americas, especially in the Río de la Plata.

In compliance with the treaty stipulated above, in January 1752 work began on the new demarcation of the boundary line between the two empires in the area. However, Indians continued to be slaves of the Portuguese farmers who were in need of manpower for agricultural labor in Brazil, leading to a war in 1754 and 1756, called the Guaraní War, in which Spanish and Portuguese together had to deal with indigenous rebels. José Joaquín de Viana personally shot dead Chief Sepé.

Upon returning, Viana founded the city of Salto, Uruguay in November 1756 and San Fernando de Maldonado, in 1757, which was so named in honor of King Ferdinand VI.

During military operations in the Rio de la Plata led by Pedro de Cevallos, in the framework of the Seven Years' War (1762 and 1763), Viana was under the command of the Spanish commander in that victorious campaign for the Spanish arms. In 1764, Viana was replaced by Agustín de la Rosa, who remained in office until 1771 when the governor of Buenos Aires, Juan Jose Vertiz, dismissed him, he sent Viana back to the government of Montevideo.

During his second term, Viana issued a series of administrative measures to curb smuggling. In early 1773, he resigned and died shortly afterwards. He was replaced by Joaquín del Pino.
