= Ambrosio O'Higgins, 1st Marquess of Osorno =

Irish-Spanish colonial administrator

The Most Excellent The Marquess of Osorno KOS
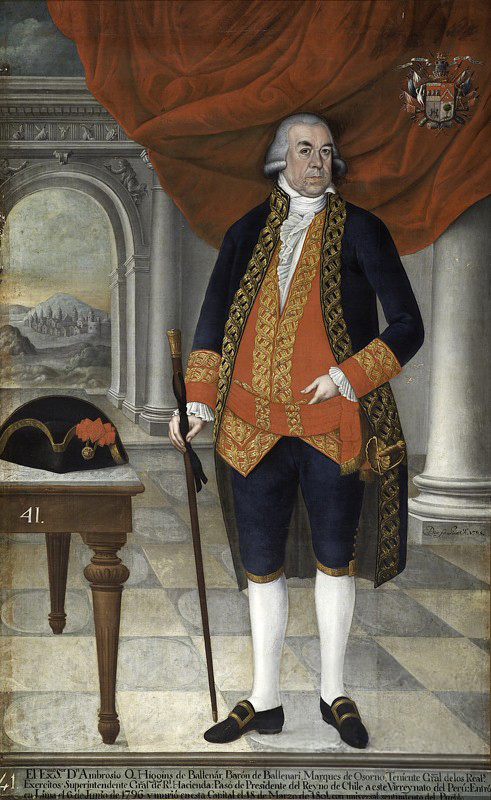

36th Viceroy of Peru
- In office 24 July 1796 – 19 March 1801
- Monarch: Charles IV
- Prime Minister: Manuel de Godoy
- Preceded by: Francisco Gil de Taboada
- Succeeded by: Manuel Arredondo

Royal Governor of Chile
- In office May 1788 – 16 May 1796
- Monarch: Charles IV
- Prime Minister: The Count of Floridablanca
- Preceded by: Ambrosio de Benavides
- Succeeded by: José de Rezabal

Personal details
- Born: c. 1720 Ballynary, County Sligo, Ireland
- Died: 19 March 1801 (aged 80–81) Lima, Peru
- Children: Bernardo O'Higgins

Ambrosio Bernardo O'Higgins y O'Higgins, 1st Marquess of Osorno (c. 1720 – 19 March 1801) born Ambrose Bernard O'Higgins (Irish: Ambrós Bearnárd Ó hUiginn), was an Irish-Spanish colonial administrator and a member of the O'Higgins family.

He served the Spanish Empire as a captain general (i.e., military governor) of Chile (1788–1796) and as the Viceroy of Peru (1796–1801). He was the father of Chilean independence leader Bernardo O'Higgins.

== Early life ==
A member of the O'Higgins family, Ambrose was born at his family's ancestral seat in Ballynary, County Sligo, Ireland. He was the son of Charles O'Higgins and his wife (and kinswoman) Margaret O'Higgins, who were forced off their lands in 1654 by Oliver Cromwell and became tenant farmers at Clondoogan near Summerhill, County Meath c. 1721. Along with other members of his family Ambrose worked in the service of the Rowley-Langford family of Summerhill House.

In 1751, O’Higgins arrived in Cádiz, where he worked as a clerk for the Butler Trading House, an Irish merchant firm. In 1756, he sailed to Buenos Aires to sell goods on behalf of a group of Cádiz merchants, before travelling overland to Santiago in Chile. He subsequently developed a plan for a series of weatherproof shelters along the trans-Andean route, helping to establish reliable year-round communication between Mendoza and Chile.

== In Chile ==
About 1760, O'Higgins enrolled in the Spanish Imperial Service as draughtsman and then engineer. He was directly responsible for the establishment of a reliable postal service between La Plata colony and the General Captaincy of Chile. On his first harrowing journey over the Andes mountains separating Argentina and Chile during the winter of 1763–64, O'Higgins conceived the idea of a chain of weatherproof shelters. By 1766, thanks to O'Higgins' efficient execution of this plan, Chile enjoyed all-year overland postal service with Argentina, which had previously been cut off for several months each winter.

In 1764, John Garland, another Irish engineer at the service of Spain who was military governor of Valdivia, convinced him to move to the neighbouring, and less established, colony of Chile as his assistant. He was initially commissioned as a junior subaltern in the Spanish army.

Following the designs of O'Higgins the mountain huts known as Casuchas del Rey were built in the 1760s to secure communications across the Andes.

In 1770 the Governor of Chile appointed him, now in his late forties, captain of a column of cavalry to resist the attacks of the Araucanian Indians, whom he defeated, and recovered big swathes of territory that had been lost by the Spaniards and founded the fort of San Carlos in the south of the province of Arauco. He proved a generous victor, gaining the good-will of the Indians by his humanity and benevolence.

He rose quickly in the ranks. On 7 September 1777, the viceroy Manuel de Amat promoted him to colonel. He soon rose to be brigadier, and in 1786 the viceroy Teodoro de Croix appointed him Intendant of Concepción. In 1788, in return for his efforts in South America, King Charles III of Spain created O'Higgins 1st Barón de Ballinar (a title in the peerage of Spain, and not to be confused with the family's existing Gaelic title) and promoted him to major-general. Soon afterward he became Captain General and Governor of Chile.

== As Governor of Chile ==
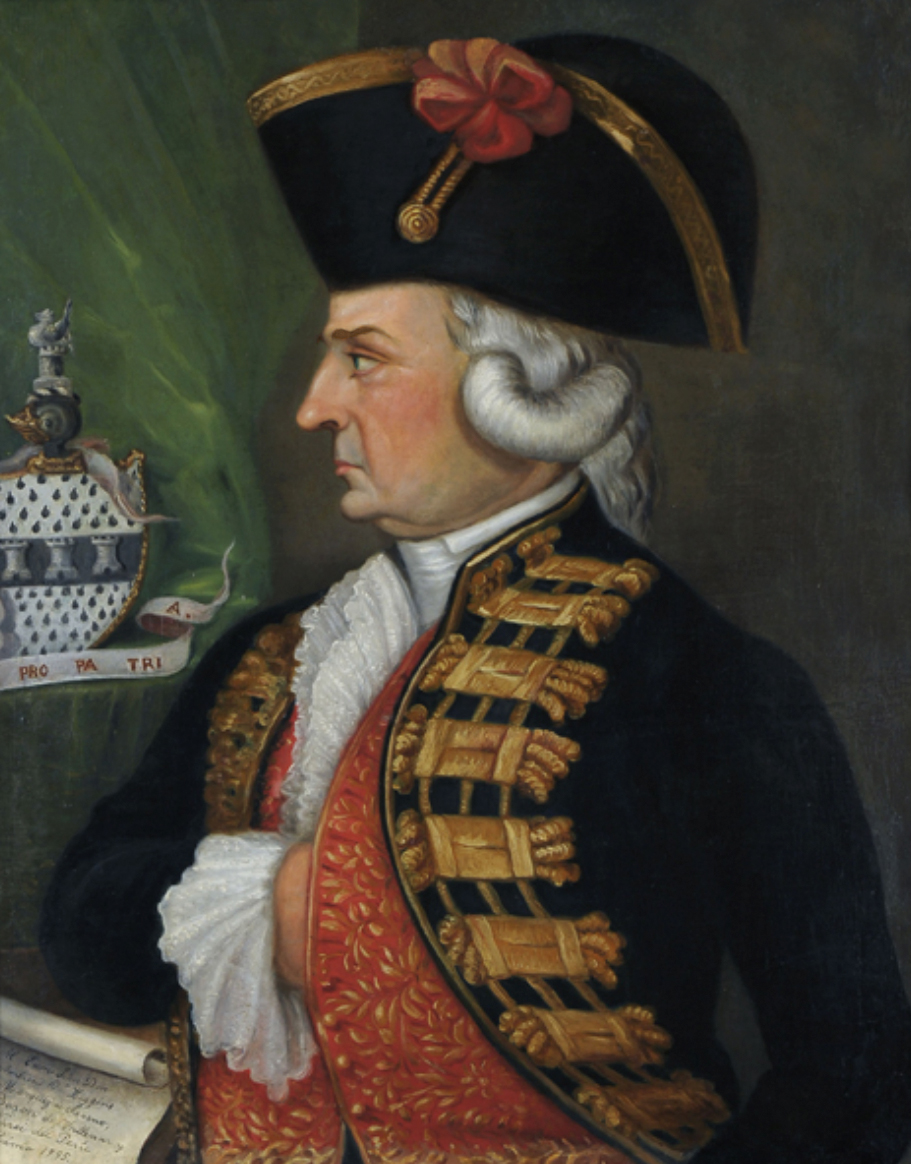
Portrait of O'Higgins

As the Governor of Chile, one of the most troublesome, poor, and remote of Spanish outposts, O'Higgins was extremely active, promoting the construction of a definitive road between the capital Santiago and the port of Valparaíso (part of the layout of which is still in use today), continued the building of the Palacio de la Moneda in Santiago, improved roads, and erected permanent dikes along the banks of the Mapocho river which regularly flooded Santiago. He founded cities including San Ambrosio de Ballenary, now Vallenar (1789); Villa de San Francisco de Borja de Combarbalá, now Combarbalá (1789); Villa San Rafael de Rozas, now Illapel (1789); Santa Rosa de los Andes, now Los Andes (1791); San José de Maipo (1792); Nueva Bilbao, now Constitución (1794); Villa de San Ambrosio de Linares, now Linares (1794), and Villa Reina Luisa del Parral, now Parral (1795).

He focused on developing the resources of the country, with a policy that accomplished much for the Spanish interest but also paved the way for later events in the country's history. He improved communications and trade with other Spanish colonies, based on a growing agricultural base. He abolished the encomienda system whereby natives were forced to work the land for the crown, an act reinforced by royal decree in 1791. He was made lieutenant-general in 1794.

O'Higgins was an early proponent of rice and sugar cane cultivation in Chile during his rule between 1788 and 1796. Rice cultivation in Chile did however only began more than a century after his rule around 1920.

=== Malaspina Expedition ===
In February 1787, the frigate Astrea under the command of Alessandro Malaspina called at Talcahuano, the port of Concepcion, in the course of a commercial circumnavigation of the world on behalf of the Royal Philippines Company. O'Higgins was military governor there at the time, and six months before had recommended that Spain organize an expedition to the Pacific similar to those led by Jean-François de Galaup, comte de Lapérouse and James Cook. O'Higgins had made this recommendation following the visit of the Lapérouse expedition to Concepcion in March 1786, and he presumably discussed it with Malaspina while the Astrea was at Concepcion. Following the Astrea's return to Spain, Malaspina produced, in partnership with José de Bustamante, a proposal for an expedition along the lines set out in O'Higgins' memorandum.

A short time later, on 14 October 1788, Malaspina was informed of the government's acceptance of his plan. José de Espinoza y Tello, one of the officers of the Malaspina expedition, subsequently confirmed the importance of the information sent by O'Higgins in stimulating the Government to initiate an extensive program of exploration in the Pacific. The prompt acceptance of O'Higgins's and Malaspina's proposal was also stimulated by news from St. Petersburg of preparations for a Russian expedition (the Mulovsky expedition) to the North Pacific under the command of Grigori I. Mulovsky that had as one of its objectives the claiming of territory on the northwest coast of America around Nootka Sound that was also claimed at the time by Spain.

=== Huilliche uprising of 1792 ===
In 1784 the Governor of Chiloé, Francisco Hurtado del Pino, and Ambrosio O'Higgins had been ordered to open a route over Huilliche territory between Maullín and Valdivia. This caused alarm among the Huilliche of the plains of Osorno, who decided to ally with the Huilliche Aillarehues of the Bueno River valley and those around Lake Ranco to the north, and to request intervention by the Governor of Valdivia, Mariano Pusterla. The latter had good relations with the Huilliches of Río Bueno and Ranco because of his support for peaceful contact coupled with a religious mission, and refused to establish any new fort in the territory. On the other hand, the Governor of Chiloé, Francisco Hurtado, supported a hard line against the Huilliches and threatened them with military invasion.

In February 1789 the Treaty of Río Bueno was signed between Huilliche chiefs and colonial authorities. This treaty averted invasion from Chiloé, and gave the Huilliches of Osorno support from the Valdivia authorities against raids by the Aillarehue of Quilacahuín. At that point the Huilliches offered to facilitate the new Camino Real and to allow Spaniards to reoccupy Osorno, a city that had been abandoned in 1602. In 1792 O'Higgins rebuilt Osorno, and as a reward was created 1st Marquess of Osorno by King Charles IV in 1796.

The treaty also allowed Spaniards to settle and form haciendas north of the Bueno River. However, abuses in this settlement and a fast advance of new haciendas made several chiefs change their minds. The caciques Tangol from Río Bueno, Queipul and Catrihuala decided to form an alliance. The Huilliche Rebellion of 1792 ensued, beginning with the pillaging of haciendas and missions, and with the ultimate aim of attacking Valdivia, which despite being well defended from the north and west, seemed vulnerable to a land attack from the southeast.

Despite the limited extent of this rebellion, which never became a real threat to Valdivia, the Spanish authorities responded to it with rigour. Governor O'Higgins chose Captain Tomás de Figueroa to lead the reprisal. Figueroa set fire to Indian houses and croplands near his marching route, and arrested a large number of male Huilliches as suspected rebels. After that, the Spaniards considered it appropriate to enter into a new treaty with the Huilliche leaders, and a conference with this object was held in Las Canoas, in Osorno, in 1793. While in the treaty of Río Bueno the Spanish had been allowed to form haciendas only north of the Bueno River, establishing that watercourse as a de facto frontier, the Spaniards now acquired the right to set up haciendas south of it.

=== Parliaments of 1793 ===
The same year, 1793, a new parliament was held in Negrete on the northern frontier with the aim of ratifying and renewing the older Treaty of Lonquilmo from 1783. Copying older treaties, the King of Spain was confirmed as the sovereign of the Araucanía, while the possession of the land was reserved for the Mapuches, which resulted in a de jure sovereignty of the King of Spain but in a de facto independence of the Mapuche-controlled lands. The treaty celebrations were held from 4 March to 7 March, with many banquets of wine and meat being held for the numerous participants. The whole treaty cost 10.897 pesos, which was, according to Diego Barros Arana, an enormous amount of money, considering the size of Chile's treasury.

== As Viceroy of Peru ==
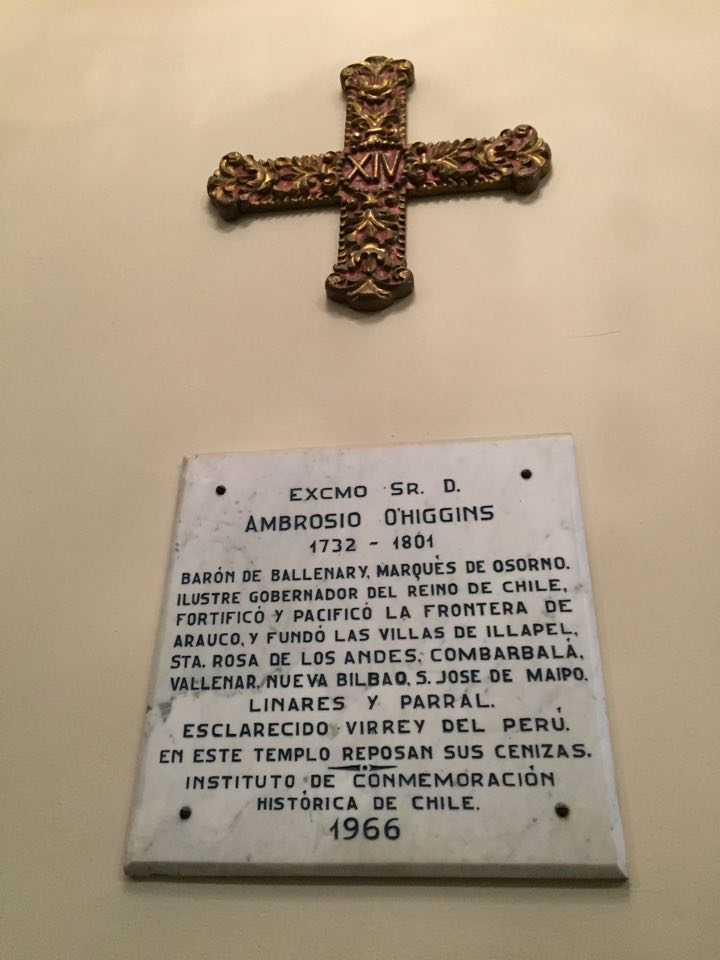
Memorial plaque, Lima

In 1796, O'Higgins was appointed Viceroy of Peru, comprising present-day Peru and Chile. As Peru was the second richest colony after New Spain (Mexico) in the Spanish empire, the Viceroyship was one of the most prominent posts in all of Spanish America.

When war was declared between Britain and Spain in 1797, O'Higgins took active measures for the defense of the coast, strengthening the fortifications of Callao and constructing a fort in Pisco. He projected and constructed a new carriage-road from Lima to Callao, and his principal attention during his short administration was directed to the improvement of means of communication.

He died suddenly after a short illness in 1801, and was interred in the Iglesia de San Pablo, now the Jesuit-run Iglesia de San Pedro, Lima.

== Genealogy ==
Archives in Spain and Ireland show that Ambrose O'Higgins was the son of Charles O'Higgins, of Ballynary, County Sligo (son of Roger O'Higgins, of Ballynary, County Sligo, and wife Margaret Brehan), and wife and cousin Margaret O'Higgins (daughter of William O'Higgins and wife Winnifred O'Fallon). Charles O'Higgins' grandfather, Sean Duff O'Higgins, held the Gaelic territorial title of Tiarna or Lord of Ballinary, and he was married to an O'Conor, daughter of the Royal House of O'Conor of Ballintober Castle, which ruled Ireland until the year 1000.

The O'Higgins family were a sept of the O'Neill dynasty who migrated to Sligo in the 12th century. As Gaelic nobles they had owned great expanses of land particularly in the Irish counties of Sligo and Westmeath, but with the expropriations of Catholics by Oliver Cromwell, and the deportation of tenants to County Sligo after the Cromwellian conquest of Ireland ca. 1654, the O'Higgins' lands became smaller and smaller.

Due to this encroachment into their land, the O'Higgins family migrated to Summerhill in County Meath, where they became lowly tenant farmers and worked in the service of the Rowley-Langford family. Their descendants remain in Summerhill however; Bridget O'Higgins who died in 1947 was the last in Summerhill to carry the family name as others had emigrated to the US and migrated to Dublin. The O'Higgins graves are located in The Moy and Agher cemeteries, both within the boundaries of the Roman Catholic parish of Dangan in Summerhill.

=== Descendants ===
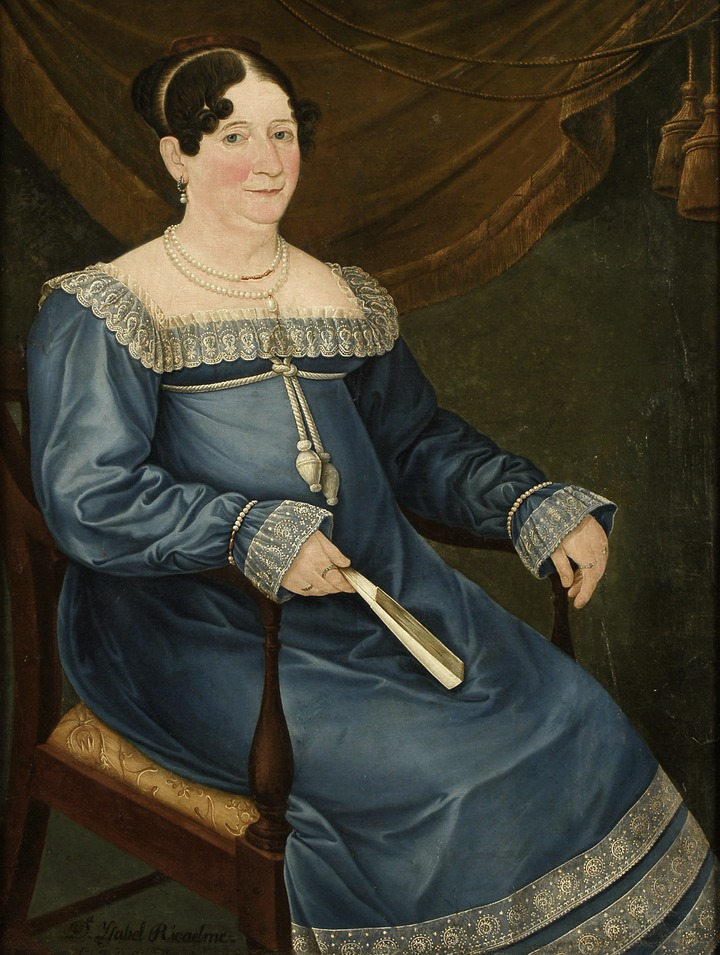
Isabel Riquelme

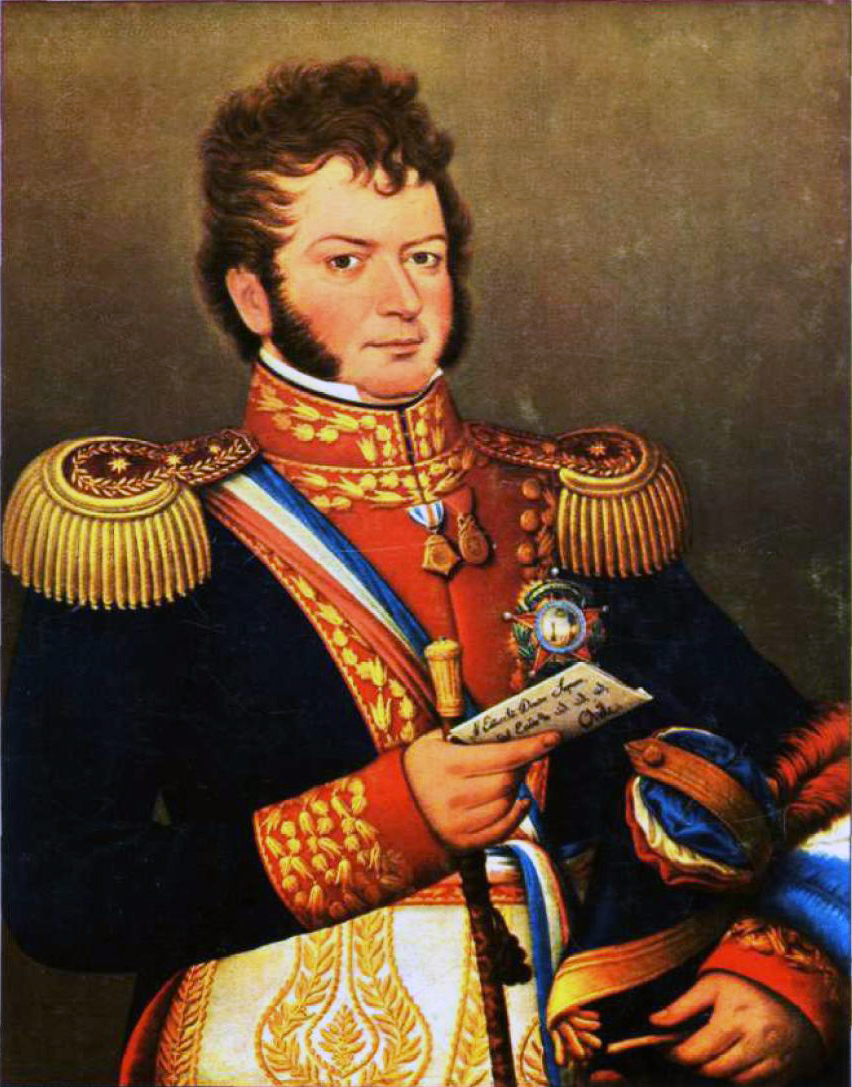
Bernardo O'Higgins

In 1777, Ambrosio O'Higgins became acquainted with the Riquelme family from Chillán, and fell in love with the daughter, Isabel Riquelme, almost forty years his junior (she was 18 or 19 at the time, while he was 57 years old). He promised marriage, but colonial law forbade marriage between public officials and criolla women without authorization of the crown. To disregard this law was to risk career and position. It is not known why he did not seek permission, but no marriage ensued even when Isabel became pregnant.

Isabel gave birth to Ambrosio's only son, Bernardo, in August 1778. Bernardo O'Higgins would later lead Chile to its independence from the Spanish Empire. Two years later, Isabel married Félix Rodríguez with whom she had a daughter, Rosa Rodríguez Riquelme. Though Ambrosio O'Higgins never saw or officially recognised his son as his legal heir, he paid for his education in England and left him a portion of his possessions in Peru and Chile.

Bernardo O'Higgins led Chile as Supreme Director from 1818 to 1823 when he was forced to resign and go into exile with his mother, sister and son Demetrio O'Higgins in Peru. Demetrio, who visited his relatives in Summerhill in 1862, had no sons and consequently all his descendants are in the female line.

== Legacy ==
There are various towns, bays, and other Spanish discoveries in the Americas which were named after his birthplace during his time as Viceroy, such as Vallenar (originally named San Ambrosio de Ballenary, later Hispanicized to Vallenar) in Chile and Vallenar Bay in Alaska.

== See also ==
- Juan Albano Pereira Márquez
- Lebian

== Sources ==
- Clissold, Stephen. "The O'Higgins of Chile" History Today (June 1957) 7#6 pp396–403; father and son.
- Barbier, Jacques A. "Tradition and Reform in Bourbon Chile: Ambrosio O'Higgins and Public Finances." The Americas 34.3 (1978): 381-399.
- Murray, Edmundo. "Ambrose O'Higgins". Dictionary of Irish Latin American Biography.
- Barros Arana, Diego (1886). Historia Jeneral de Chile (in Spanish). Vol. VI. Santiago, Chile: Rafael Jover. ISBN 9780598482334.
- Carvallo y Goyeneche, Vicente (1875). Miguel Luis Amunategui (ed.). Descripción Histórica y Geografía del Reino de Chile Vol. II (1626–1787). Coleccion de historiadores de Chile y documentos relativos a la historia nacional (in Spanish). Vol. IX (Instituto Chileno de Cultura Hispánica, Academia Chilena de la Historia ed.). Santiago, Chile: Imprenta de La Estrella de Chile. p. 483.
- Donoso, Ricardo (1941). El Marqués de Osorno, Don Ambrosio Higgins (in Spanish). Santiago, Chile: Imprenta de la Universidad de Chile.
- Fanning, Tim (2016). Paisanos: The Forgotten Irish Who Changed the Face of Latin America. Dublin: Gill Books. ISBN 978-0717171811.
- Gay, Claudio (1848). Historia física y política de Chile (1749–1808) (in Spanish). Vol. IV. Paris, France: En casa del autor. p. 506.
- Medina, José Toribio (1906). Diccionario Biográfico Colonial de Chile (PDF) (in Spanish). Santiago, Chile: Imprenta Elzeviriana. pp. 165–166 of 1, 006.
- O'Higgins, Thomas. "The O'Higgins Clan Association".

Government offices
Preceded by Ambrosio de Benavides	Royal Governor of Chile; 1788–1796	Succeeded by José de Rezabal
Preceded by Francisco Gil de Taboada	Viceroy of Peru; 1796–1801	Succeeded by Manuel Arredondo
Military offices
Preceded by Ambrosio de Benavides	Captain General of Chile; 1788–1796	Succeeded by José de Rezabal
Spanish nobility
New title	Marquess of Osorno; 1792–1801	Succeeded by Abeyance
