= Antonio de Olaguer y Feliú =

Spanish soldier and politician

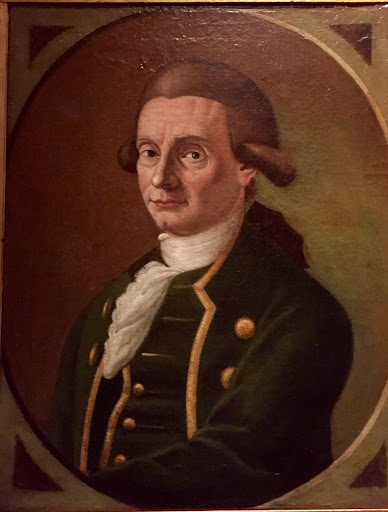

Viceroy of the Río de la Plata
- In office 1797–1799
- Monarch: Charles IV
- Preceded by: Pedro Melo de Portugal
- Succeeded by: Gabriel de Avilés y del Fierro

Personal details
- Born: Antonio de Olaguer Feliú Heredia; 14 October 1742 El Bierzo, Spain
- Died: 19 May 1813 (aged 70) Madrid, Spain
- Spouse: Ana de Azcuénaga
- Occupation: Politician
- Profession: Military man

Military service
- Allegiance: Spain
- Branch/service: Spanish Army
- Rank: General

Antonio Olaguer Feliú y Heredia López y Domec (1742–1813) was a Spanish soldier and politician who spent most of his career in South America.

== Biography ==
Born in Villafranca del Bierzo, León, Olaguer Feliú was sent to Buenos Aires as a military specialist during the governorship of Pedro de Cevallos. He took part in the siege of Colonia del Sacramento in 1777. He was named military inspector in 1783.

He served as Governor of Montevideo between August 2, 1790, and February 11, 1797, and in 1792 was promoted to Field Marshal.

Then don Antonio Olaguer Feliú was named Viceroy of the Río de la Plata, a position he occupied between May 2, 1797, and March 14, 1799.

Coat of arms of Antonio Olaguer Feliú, used as Viceroy of the Río de la Plata.

During his mandate, he had to contend with the presence of British and Portuguese forces in the Río de la Plata region, as well as nascent revolutionary sentiment inspired by the recent French Revolution. He opened the port of Buenos Aires to foreign traffic in a bid to stimulate the commercial activities of the Viceroyalty, which had begun to suffer from the growing tensions between the European powers.

Coat of arms of Antonio Olaguer Feliú, used as Secretary of War of king Charles IV.

On his return to Spain, he was named Secretary of War by Charles IV. He died in Madrid in 1813.

He was married to Ana de Azcuénaga de Olaguer Feliú.

== Coat of arms ==
The shield was party per pale. The first party was quartered. In the first and fourth quarters, there was a mount in natural colors on an argent field. In the second and third quarters, there were an argent oval roundel surrounded by eight argent stars on a gules field. In the second party, there were five argent castles triple towered in saltire on a gules field. External ornaments: the shield had six flags and two banners characteristic of Field Marshals and other ornaments (guns, spears, halberd, sword, drums, etc.) of the profession of arms. The coat of arms had a helmet with seven bars and surmounted by a Field Marshal coronet.

== Notes ==
Government offices
Preceded by Joaquín del Pino	Governor of Montevideo 1790–1797	Succeeded by José de Bustamante
Preceded by Pedro de Melo	Viceroy of Río de la Plata 1797–1799	Succeeded by The Marquis of Avilés
Preceded by Pedro Cevallos	Secretary of War 1807–1808	Succeeded by Gonzalo O'Farrill y Herrera
