= Manuel Arredondo y Pelegrín =

Spanish judge, soldier and colonial administrator

President of the Real Audiencia of Lima
- In office 1801–1801
- Monarch: Charles IV of Spain
- Preceded by: The Marquess of Osorno
- Succeeded by: Gabriel de Avilés y del Fierro

Personal details
- Born: 1738 Bárcena de Cicero, Spain
- Died: 1822 (aged 83–84) Lima, Peru
- Occupation: Politician
- Profession: Jurist

Manuel Antonio Arredondo y Pelegrín, 1st Marquess of San Juan de Nepomuceno (Bárcena de Cicero; c. 1738 — Lima, 1822) was a Spanish judge, soldier and colonial administrator in Peru and Ecuador. Briefly in 1801 he was interim viceroy of Peru.

== Biography ==
Arredondo arrived in Peru in 1779 as an oidor (judge) of the Audiencia of Lima. He witnessed firsthand the insurrection of Túpac Amaru II, which broke out in November of the following year. Túpac Amaru was defeated in January 1781 and executed in May.

In 1786 Arredondo was named regent of the Audiencia, and a short time later captain general (military commander) of the viceroyalty. In 1808 he was granted the title of marqués de San Juan Nepomuceno.

Upon the death of Viceroy Ambrosio O'Higgins in Lima on March 19, 1801, Arredondo took office as interim viceroy (by virtue of his position as head of the Audiencia). He was interim viceroy until November 5, 1801, when Gabriel de Avilés, 2nd Marquis of Avilés arrived and took over the government.

The revolt of Túpac Amaru was not the only one Arredondo faced during the time he was an administrator in Peru.

A Revolution broken out in Quito on August 10, 1809 in response to the installation of Napoleon's brother Joseph as king of Spain the previous year. A governing junta (Quito's second) was installed, but the viceroy of Peru, José Fernando de Abascal y Sousa sent Colonel Arredondo with a body of troops to suppress it. Quito (i.e., Ecuador) was not in the Viceroyalty of Peru at this date, but rather in the Viceroyalty of New Granada. Arredondo did suppress the insurrection, entering the city of Quito on November 24, 1809. The previous government was reestablished. It refused to honor the earlier promise of amnesty to the rebels and began to deal with them repressively.

Arredondo was married twice, first to Juana Micheo Jiménez y Lobatón, then to Juana Erze, widow of Juan Fulgencio Apesteguía, Marquis de Torrehermosa, a wealthy landowner from Ica. The affair with Juana Erze had actually started before their respective spouses were deceased; the Apesteguías already had two daughters who were both physically unattractive and not very intelligent. Because of Apesteguía's sympathy with the independentist cause, Arredondo denounced him to his boss, Viceroy Abascal, who arrested Apesteguía and deported him to Spain, where he died. During Arredondo's marriage to Juana Erze his stepdaughters died, possibly as a result of poisoning, for which some blamed Arredondo, although nothing was ever proven. His second wife soon died as well, depressed due to her daughters' early deaths.

Arredondo thus left no descendants, and his nephew Brigadier Manuel Arredondo y Miaño inherited the title but not the Montalván estate (originally property of the Marquis of Torrehermosa), which was confiscated by the independent government shortly after Antonio's death in 1821.

Government offices
Preceded by Ambrosio O'Higgins	Viceroy of Peru; 1801	Succeeded by Gabriel de Avilés
