= Casuchas del Rey =

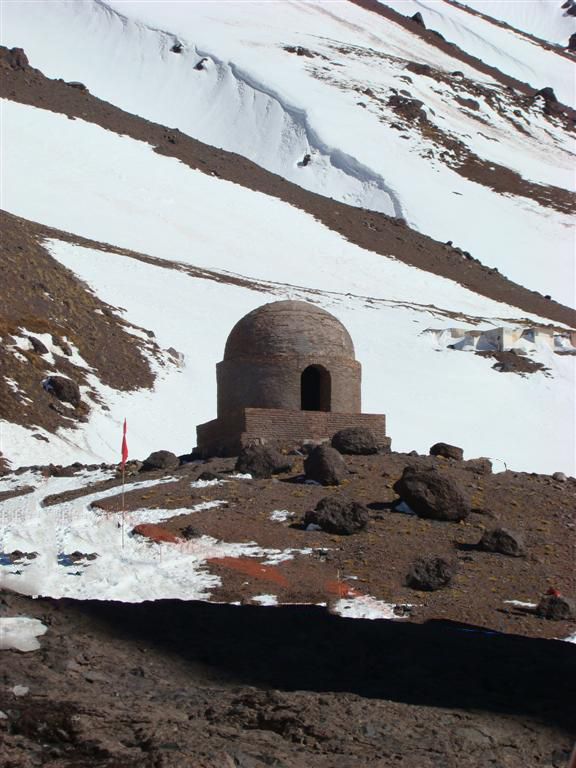
A Casucha de la Cordillera at 3197 m a.s.l. at Las Cuevas, Argentina.

The Casuchas del Rey or Casuchas de la Cordillera are a string of small mountain shelters made of stone masonry along the route of the Uspallata Pass of the Principal Cordillera in the Andes of Chile and Argentina. The shelters were built to improve the intra-colonial postal system of the Spanish Empire.

The shelters were created following the designs of Ambrosio O'Higgins in 1766 at a time when Cuyo was still part of the Captaincy General of Chile. Each shelter had a capacity for about thirty persons and stock of supplies inside. This included yerba mate, as mate was highly valued by those who frequented the cold Andean highlands.

Two events are credited to have triggered the construction of the mountain shelters; O'Higgins' near-death experience while crossing the Andes in 1763, and the Seven Years' War which made improvements to overland communication an imperative as seaborne communications between Buenos Aires and Lima could be intercepted and while the traditional route across Potosí was overly long.

German painter Johann Moritz Rugendas crossed the Andes in 1835 following the Casuchas del Rey. The 60 paintings and sketches he made on his way have served to locate the remains of the shelters.
