= Lebian =

Pehuenche toqui

Lebian (Lebiantu) (died September 1776) was toqui from 1769 to 1774, who led the Pehuenche against the Spanish Empire in Chile following the Mapuche Uprising of 1766 during the Arauco War.

== Life ==
During the war, in 1769 Lebian led a malón against the region of Laja River and Los Ángeles taking cattle and destroying every estancia in their path. Spanish troops sent against him were defeated and forced to retire to Los Ángeles. Encouraged by the victory Lebian attacked fort Santa Bárbara two days later, although repulsed with some losses, they managed to set fire to the town and to take the cattle found in the area.

At the end of the war he was part of the delegation sent to Santiago to make peace in 1774. The same year he was also involved in a feud against the toqui Ayllapagui.

=== Assassination ===
In September 1776, according to Gov. Agustín de Jáuregui's policy of rewarding loyalty, Lebian was named distinguished soldier of the Spanish Army, and travelled to the city of Los Angeles for a meeting with the maestre de campo Ambrosio O'Higgins. As he was returning to his country, a band of Spaniards ambushed and killed him. One of the suspects was a captain Dionisio Contreras, but nothing was proved against him. It was rumored that O'Higgins had arranged the death as part of a policy of eliminating by such means hostile or strong Mapuche leaders in preference to open warfare, but O'Higgins denied responsibility for the ambush, persecuted the assassins and hanged one of them.

== Additional information ==
=== See also ===
- Arauco War
- Agustín de Jáuregui
- Ambrosio O'Higgins

=== Sources ===
- Barros Arana, Diego (1886). Historia Jeneral de Chile (in Spanish). Vol. VI. Santiago, Chile: Rafael Jover. ISBN 9780598482341.
- Carvallo y Goyeneche, Vicente (1875). Miguel Luis Amunategui (ed.). Descripción Histórica y Geografía del Reino de Chile Vol. II (1626 - 1787). Coleccion de historiadores de Chile y documentos relativos a la historia nacional (in Spanish). Vol. IX (Instituto Chileno de Cultura Hispánica, Academia Chilena de la Historia ed.). Santiago, Chile: Imprenta de La Estrella de Chile. p. 483.
- Gay, Claudio (1848). Historia física y política de Chile (1749-1808) (in Spanish). Vol. IV. Paris, France: En casa del autor. p. 506.
