= 2023 Abu Dhabi Master =

Padel championships

- Date: 18 February – 26 February 2023
- Edition: 1st
- Category: Master
- Location: Abu Dhabi, United Arab Emirates
- Venue: Bab Al Nojoum, Hudayriyat Island

Champions
- Men's doubles: (Argentina) Agustín Tapia (Spain) Arturo Coello
- Women's doubles: (Spain) Ariana Sánchez (Spain) Paula Josemaría

Chronology
Previous
Qatar Major (PP)
Next
La Rioja Open

The WPT Abu Dhabi Master 2023 (officially WPT Modon Abu Dhabi Padel Master 2023) was the first tournament of the eleventh edition of the World Padel Tour. It was held between February 18 and 26, 2023, at the Bab Al Nojoum on Hudayriat Island in Abu Dhabi. It was the first WPT tournament to award 2,000 ranking points to each player in the winning pairs, as previously, victories in Master tournaments awarded 1,700 points.

In the women's division, Ariana Sánchez and Paula Josemaría defeated Alejandra Salazar and Gemma Triay in the finals, thus regaining the number 1 ranking they lost in the 2022 Master Final which had prevented them from finishing the year as such.

In the men's division, the new young pair formed by Agustín Tapia and Arturo Coello showed that they could aspire to reach the top, beating the number one ranked team in the finals, Alejandro Galán and Juan Lebrón, who still had a large points advantage in the ranking.

== Registered teams ==
=== Male ===
Rnk.	Team	WPT Ranking Points
1	(Spain) Alejandro Galán (Spain) Juan Lebrón	33.440
2 (Note: Since there was a tie in scores, a draw was held to decide pairs 2 and 3.)	(Argentina) Agustín Tapia (Spain) Arturo Coello	20.485
3	(Argentina) Fernando Belasteguín (Argentina) Sanyo Gutiérrez	20.485
4	(Argentina) Juan Tello (Spain) Paquito Navarro	15.550
5	(Argentina) Franco Stupaczuk (Argentina) Martín Di Nenno	15.525
6	(Spain) Alejandro Ruiz (Spain) Momo González	11.160
7	(Spain) Coki Nieto (Brazil) Pablo Lima	10.736
8	(Argentina) Federico Chingotto (Spain) Javier Garrido	9.895
9	(Brazil) Lucas Campagnolo (Argentina) Maxi Sánchez	8.100
10	(Argentina) Agustín Gutiérrez (Argentina) Lucho Capra	6.581
11	(Spain) Javier Leal (Spain) Jon Sanz	4.746
12	(Spain) Alejandro Arroyo (Spain) Miguel Yanguas	4.686
13	(Spain) Francisco Gil (Argentina) Ramiro Moyano	4.339
14	(Spain) Gonzalo Rubio (Spain) Javier Ruiz	3.996
15	(Argentina) Juan Cruz Belluati (Argentina) Miguel Lamperti	3.947
16	(Spain) José García Diestro (Spain) Pincho Fernández	3.524
17	(Spain) Josete Rico (Spain) Salvador Oria	3.442
18	(Brazil) Lucas Bergamini (Spain) Víctor Ruiz	3.431
19	(Spain) Javier Rico (Spain) Jorge Ruiz	3.277
20	(Spain) Eduardo Alonso (Spain) Juanlu Esbri	2.935
21	(Argentina) Agustín Gomez Silingo (Spain) Juan Martín Díaz	2.741
22	(Spain) Javier García Mora (Spain) Javier González Barahona	2.525
23	(Spain) Marc Quílez (Spain) Toni Bueno	2.326
24	(Spain) Antón Sans (Spain) Teodoro Zapata	2.219
25	(Spain) Ignacio Vilariño (Spain) Jaime Muñoz	2.001
26	(Spain) Mario del Castillo (Spain) Miguel Benítez Lara	1.989
27	(Spain) Joseda Sánchez (Spain) Raúl Marcos	1.919
(W.C.)	(United Arab Emirates) Abdullah Al Abdullah (United Arab Emirates) Fares Al Janahi	0
Qualified from the qualifying rounds
A	(Spain) Javier Martínez Vázquez (Spain) Rafa Méndez Ruiz	1.755
B	(Spain) Martín Sanchéz Piñeiro (Spain) Pablo García Rodrigo	1.550
C	(Spain) Iván Ramírez (Spain) Pablo Cardona	1.645
D	(Spain) Álvaro Cepero (Spain) Arnau Ayats	1.688

=== Female ===
Rnk.	Team	WPT Ranking Points
1	(Spain) Alejandra Salazar (Spain) Gemma Triay	33.060
2	(Spain) Ariana Sánchez (Spain) Paula Josemaría	32.390
3	(Spain) Bea González (Spain) Marta Ortega	16.926
4	(Spain) Patty Llaguno (Spain) Victoria Iglesias Segador	10.448
5	(Argentina) Aranza Osoro (Spain) Lucía Sainz	10.075
6	(Spain) Bárbara Las Heras (Spain) Verónica Virseda	9.770
7	(Spain) Mapi Sánchez Alayeto (Spain) Majo Sánchez Alayeto	9.145
8	(Spain) Tamara Icardo (Argentina) Virginia Riera	8.825
9	(Argentina) Delfina Brea (Portugal) Sofia Araújo	6.641
10	(Argentina) Claudia Jensen (Spain) Jessica Castelló	4.995
11	(France) Alix Collombon (Spain) Carla Mesa	4.907
12	(Spain) Lorena Rufo (Spain) Marta Talaván	4.383
13	(Spain) Esther Carnicero (Spain) Lucía Martínez	3.601
14	(Sweden) Carolina Navarro (Spain) Mª Carmen Villalba	3.481
15	(Spain) Beatriz Caldera (Spain) Carmen Goenaga	3.383
16	(Portugal) Ana Catarina Nogueira (Spain) Eli Amatriaín	3.135
17	(Spain) Marina Guinart (Spain) Nuria Rodríguez	3.084
18	(Spain) Claudia Fernández Sánchez (Argentina) Julieta Bidahorria	3.063
19	(Spain) Marta Barrera (Spain) Marta Caparrós	2.671
20	(Spain) Anna Cortiles (Spain) Sofía Saiz	2.474
21	(Spain) Araceli Martínez (Spain) Noa Cánovas	2.470
22	(Spain) Alejandra Alonso (Spain) Melania Merino	2.391
23	(Spain) Marina Martínez Lobo (Spain) Teresa Navarro	2.340
24	(Spain) Alicia Blanco (Spain) Arantxa Soriano	2.186
25	(Spain) Carolina Orsi (France) Léa Godallier	2.148
26	(Italy) Emily Stellato (Italy) Giulia Sussarello	1.925
27	(Spain) Lorena Alonso (Spain) Sandra Hernández Camacho	1.884
(W.C.)	(United Arab Emirates) Aisha Alawadhi (United Arab Emirates) Alia Taher	0
Qualified from the qualifying rounds
A	(Italy) Carlotta Casali (Spain) Mª Eulalia Rodríguez	1.035
B	(Italy) Giorgia Marchetti (Brazil) Raquel Piltcher	1.169
C	(Spain) Águeda Pérez (Spain) Sara Ruiz	1.304
D	(Spain) Ana Fernandéz de Ossó (Spain) Lara Arruabarrena	905

== Schedule ==
The matches began on 18th February at the "321 Sports" club with the preliminary rounds. The pairings and schedules for the final draw were revealed on February 9.

- 18 February (Saturday): 1st and 2nd round of men's qualifying;
- 19 February (Sunday): 3rd round of men's qualifying and 1st and 2nd round of women's qualifying;
- 20 February (Monday): final round of men's and women's qualifiers;
- 21 February (Tuesday): round of 32;
- 22 February (Wednesday): round of 32;
- 23 February (Tuesday): round of 16;
- 24 February (Friday): quarter-finals;
- 25 February (Saturday): semi-finals;
- 26 February (Sunday): finals.

== Results ==
=== Men's Bracket ===
Round of 32
1	(Spain) Galán / (Spain) Lebrón	6	7	6
(Argentina) Moyano / (Spain) Xisco	7	5	1
(Spain) Arroyo / (Spain) Yanguas	6	6
(Spain) Ayats / (Spain) Cepero (D)	3	0
(Spain) J. Muñoz / (Spain) I. Vilariño	4	6	6
(Spain) R. Marcos / (Spain) Joseda S.	6	3	2
(Spain) P. García / (Spain) Piñeiro (B)	1
7	(Spain) Coki / (Brazil) Lima	6
5	(Argentina) Stupa / (Argentina) Di Nenno	6	6
(Brazil) Bergamini / (Spain) V. Ruiz	1	4
(Spain) Méndez / (Spain) Martínez (A)	6	4	1
(Spain) Del Castillo / (Spain) Benítez	2	6	6
(Argentina) Lamperti / (Argentina) Belluati	6	4
(Argentina) Silingo / (Spain) J.M. Díaz	7	6
(Spain) Josete Rico / (Spain) S. Oria	3	2
3	(Argentina) Belasteguín / (Argentina) Sanyo	6	6
4	(Argentina) Tello / (Spain) Paquito	4	5
(Spain) Javi R. / (Spain) G. Rubio	6	7
(United Arab Emirates) Janahi / (United Arab Emirates) Abdullah (W.C.)	0	0
(Spain) Jorge R. / (Spain) Javi Rico	6	6
(Spain) A. Sans / (Spain) T. Zapata	2	3
(Spain) Ivan R. / (Spain) Cardona (C)	6	6
(Spain) Leal / (Spain) Sanz	0	6
8	(Spain) Garrido / (Argentina) Chingotto	6	7
6	(Spain) Alex Ruiz / (Spain) Momo	6	6	7
(Argentina) Maxi / (Brazil) Campagnolo	1	7	6
(Spain) Pincho / (Spain) J.G. Diestro	7	7
(Spain) J. Esbri / (Spain) E. Alonso	5	6
(Argentina) A. Gutiérrez / (Argentina) Lucho	3	3
(Spain) M. Quílez / (Spain) T. Bueno	6	6
(Spain) Mora / (Spain) Barahona	6	6
2	(Argentina) Tapia / (Spain) Coello	7	7

Round of 16
1	(Spain) Galán / (Spain) Lebrón	3	6	6
(Spain) Yanguas / (Spain) Arroyo	6	3	2
(Spain) J. Muñoz / (Spain) I. Vilariño	3	2
7	(Spain) Coki / (Brazil) Lima	6	6
5	(Argentina) Stupa / (Argentina) Di Nenno	6	7
(Spain) Del Castillo / (Spain) Benítez	3	6
(Argentina) Silingo / (Spain) J.M. Díaz	4	4
3	(Argentina) Belasteguín / (Argentina) Sanyo	6	6
(Spain) Javi R. / (Spain) G. Rubio	6	6	6
(Spain) Jorge R. / (Spain) Javi Rico	7	2	2
(Spain) Ivan R. / (Spain) Cardona (C)	6	6
8	(Spain) Garrido / (Argentina) Chingotto	2	3
6	(Spain) Momo / (Spain) Alex	3	6	4
(Spain) Pincho / (Spain) J.G. Diestro	6	0	6
(Spain) M. Quílez / (Spain) T. Bueno	3	2
2	(Argentina) Tapia / (Spain) Coello	6	6

Quarter-Finals
1	(Spain) Galán / (Spain) Lebrón	6	6
7	(Spain) Coki / (Brazil) Lima	4	1
5	(Argentina) Stupa / (Argentina) Di Nenno	6	6
3	(Argentina) Belasteguín / (Argentina) Sanyo	3	3
(Spain) Javi R. / (Spain) G. Rubio	6	2	6
(Spain) Ivan R. / (Spain) Cardona (C)	4	6	2
(Spain) Pincho / (Spain) J.G. Diestro	2	4
2	(Argentina) Tapia / (Spain) Coello	6	6

Semi-Finals
1	(Spain) Galán / (Spain) Lebrón	5	6	6
5	(Argentina) Stupa / (Argentina) Di Nenno	7	4	3
(Spain) Javi R. / (Spain) G. Rubio	2	3
2	(Argentina) Tapia / (Spain) Coello	6	6

Final
1	(Spain) Galán / (Spain) Lebrón	6	3
2	(Argentina) Tapia / (Spain) Coello	7	6

=== Women's bracket ===
Round of 32
1	(Spain) G. Triay / (Spain) Salazar	6	6
(Spain) S. Saiz / (Spain) A. Cortiles	2	0
(Italy) Casali / (Spain) Rodríguez (A)	2	6	0
(Spain) Talaván / (Spain) L. Rufo	6	4	6
(Spain) T. Navarro / (Spain) Marina M.	2	4
(Sweden) C. Navarro / (Spain) Villalba	6	6
(Portugal) Nogueira / (Spain) Amatriaín	3	3
5	(Spain) L. Sainz / (Argentina) Aranza	6	6
7	(Spain) Majo / (Spain) Mapi	6	4	6
(Argentina) Delfi / (Portugal) S. Araújo	3	6	2
(Italy) Sussarello / (Italy) Stellato	5	2
(Spain) Caldera / (Spain) Goenaga	7	6
(Spain) Arantxa / (Spain) A. Blanco	1	3
(Spain) Castelló / (Argentina) Jensen	6	6
(Spain) Lara A. / (Spain) Ana Fdez. (D)	1	1
3	(Spain) Bea / (Spain) Martita	6	6
4	(Spain) Victoria / (Spain) Patty	6	6
(Spain) Lorena A. / (Spain) Sandra H.	1	1
(Spain) Guinart / (Spain) Nuria R.	2	5
(Italy) C. Orsi / (France) Godallier	6	7
(Spain) A. Alonso / (Spain) M. Merino	7	3	3
(Spain) Mesa / (France) Collombon	6	6	6
(Spain) Bidahorria / (Spain) Claudia F.	4	1
8	(Spain) Tamara / (Argentina) Virgínia	6	6
6	(Spain) Virseda / (Spain) Bárbara	6	6
(Spain) Barrera / (Spain) Caparrós	1	0
(Spain) Águeda / (Spain) Sara R. (C)	7	6
(Brazil) Piltcher / (Italy) Marchetti (B)	6	3
(Spain) Esther C. / (Spain) Lucía M.	2	6
(Spain) Araceli / (Spain) Cánovas	6	7
(United Arab Emirates) Alawadhi / (United Arab Emirates) Taher (W.C.)	0	0
2	(Spain) Ariana / (Spain) Paula	6	6

Round of 16
1	(Spain) G. Triay / (Spain) Salazar	6	6
(Spain) Talaván / (Spain) L. Rufo	4	4
(Sweden) C. Navarro / (Spain) Villalba	6	2	2
5	(Spain) L. Sainz / (Argentina) Aranza	4	6	6
7	(Spain) Majo / (Spain) Mapi	7	6
(Spain) Caldera / (Spain) Goenaga	6	1
(Spain) Castelló / (Argentina) Jensen	4	6	6
3	(Spain) Bea / (Spain) Martita	6	4	3
4	(Spain) Victoria / (Spain) Patty	6	6
(Italy) C. Orsi / (France) Godallier	1	2
(Spain) Mesa / (France) Collombon	3	0
8	(Spain) Tamara / (Argentina) Virgínia	6	6
6	(Spain) Virseda / (Spain) Bárbara	6	6
(Spain) Águeda / (Spain) Sara R. (C)	0	2
(Spain) Araceli / (Spain) Cánovas	0	1
2	(Spain) Ariana / (Spain) Paula	6	6

Quarter-Finals
1	(Spain) G. Triay / (Spain) Salazar	6	6
5	(Spain) L. Sainz / (Argentina) Aranza	4	2
7	(Spain) Majo / (Spain) Mapi	4	6
(Spain) Castelló / (Argentina) Jensen	6	7
4	(Spain) Victoria / (Spain) Patty	4	3
8	(Spain) Tamara / (Argentina) Virgínia	6	6
6	(Spain) Virseda / (Spain) Bárbara	2	0
2	(Spain) Ariana / (Spain) Paula	6	6

Semi-Finals
1	(Spain) G. Triay / (Spain) Salazar	6	6
(Spain) Castelló / (Argentina) Jensen	4	2
8	(Spain) Tamara / (Argentina) Virgínia	2	1
2	(Spain) Ariana / (Spain) Paula	6	6

Final
1	(Spain) G. Triay / (Spain) Salazar	3	3
2	(Spain) Ariana / (Spain) Paula	6	6

=== Final qualifiers round ===
Men's

Data	Qualified	WPT Ranking Point	Opponents	Result
A	(Spain) Javier Martínez Vázquez (Spain) Rafa Méndez Ruiz	1.755 vs 1.514	(Spain) Jesús Moya (Spain) Francisco Guerrero	6–4 / 4–6 / 6–4
B	(Spain) Pablo García Rodrigo (Spain) Martín Sanchéz Piñeiro	1.550 vs 314	(Argentina) Leo Augsburger (Argentina) Valentino Libaak	7–5 / 6–7 / 6–3
C	(Spain) Iván Ramírez (Spain) Pablo Cardona	1.645 vs 1.057	(Spain) Borja Yribarren (Spain) Cándido Alfaro	6–4 / 7–6
D	(Spain) Arnau Ayats (Spain) Álvaro Cepero	1.688 vs 829	(Spain) Álvaro Meléndez Amaya (Spain) Pedro Meléndez	6–1 / 6–4

Women's

Data	Qualified	WPT Ranking Point	Opponents	Result
A	(Italy) Carlotta Casali (Spain) Mª Eulalia Rodríguez	1.035 vs 1.880	(Russia) Ksenia Sharifova (Spain) Patricia Martínez Fortún	6–4 / 5–7 / 6–3
B	(Italy) Giorgia Marchetti (Brazil) Raquel Piltcher	1.169 vs 1.505	(Spain) Ariadna Cañellas (Spain) Sandra Bellver	6–3 / 6–2
C	(Spain) Agueda Pérez (Spain) Sara Ruiz	1.304 vs 925	(Spain) Letizia Manquillo (Spain) Nuria Vivancos	3–1 / injury
D	(Spain) Ana Fernandéz de Ossó (Spain) Lara Arruabarrena	905 vs 1.736	(Spain) Jimena Velasco (Spain) Sara Pujals	2–6 / 6–4 / 6–3

=== Round of 32 ===
Men's

Date	Winners	Score	Opponent	Refs.
21/2/2023	(Spain) Javier García Mora (Spain) Javier González Barahona	6–7 / 6–7	(Argentina) Agustín Tapia (Spain) Arturo Coello	
21/2/2023	(Spain) José García Diestro (Spain) Pincho Fernández	7–5 / 7–6	(Spain) Eduardo Alonso (Spain) Juanlu Esbri	
21/2/2023	(Spain) Ignacio Vilariño (Spain) Jaime Muñoz	4–6 / 6–2 / 6–3	(Spain) Joseda Sánchez (Spain) Raúl Marcos	
21/2/2023	(Argentina) Juan Tello (Spain) Paquito Navarro	4–6 / 5–7	(Spain) Gonzalo Rubio (Spain) Javier Ruiz González	
21/2/2023	(Spain) Javier Leal (Spain) Jon Sanz	0–6 / 6–7	(Argentina) Federico Chingotto (Spain) Javi Garrido	
21/2/2023	(Spain) Antón Sans (Spain) Teodoro Zapata	2–6 / 3–6	(Spain) Iván Ramírez (Spain) Pablo Cardona	
21/2/2023	(Spain) Aléx Ruiz (Spain) Momo González	6–1 / 6–7 / 7–6	(Brazil) Lucas Campagnolo (Argentina) Maxi Sánchez	
21/2/2023	(Argentina) Agustín Gutiérrez (Argentina) Lucho Capra	3–6 / 3–6	(Spain) Marc Quílez (Spain) Toni Bueno	
22/2/2023	(Spain) Josete Rico (Spain) Salvador Oria	3–6 / 2–6	(Argentina) Fernando Belasteguín (Argentina) Sanyo Gutiérrez	
22/2/2023	(Argentina) Franco Stupaczuk (Argentina) Martín Di Nenno	6–1 / 6–4	(Brazil) Lucas Bergamini (Spain) Víctor Ruiz	
22/2/2023	(Spain) Javier Martínez Vázquez (Spain) Rafa Méndez Ruiz	6–2 / 4–6 / 1–6	(Spain) Mario del Castillo (Spain) Miguel Benítez	
22/2/2023	(Spain) Alejandro Galán (Spain) Juan Lebrón	6–7 / 7–5 / 6–1	(Spain) Francisco Gil (Argentina) Ramiro Moyano	
22/2/2023	(Spain) Martín Sanchéz Piñeiro (Spain) Pablo García Rodrigo	1–6 / 0–0 (injury)	(Spain) Coki Nieto (Brazil) Pablo Lima	
22/2/2023	(Argentina) Miguel Lamperti (Argentina) Juan Cruz Belluati	6–7 / 4–6	(Argentina) Agustín Gomez Silingo (Spain) Juan Martín Díaz	
22/2/2023	(United Arab Emirates) Fares Al Janahi (W.C.) (United Arab Emirates) A. Al Abdullah (W.C.)	0–6 / 0–6	(Spain) Javier Rico (Spain) Jorge Ruiz Gutiérrez	
22/2/2023	(Spain) Alejandro Arroyo (Spain) Miguel Yanguas	6–3 / 6–0	(Spain) Arnau Ayats (Spain) Álvaro Cepero	

Women's

Date	Winners	Score	Opponent	Refs.
21/2/2023	(Spain) Alejandra Salazar (Spain) Gemma Triay	6–2 / 6–0	(Spain) Sofía Saiz (Spain) Anna Cortiles	
21/2/2023	(Italy) Carlotta Casali (Spain) Mª Eulalia Rodríguez	2–6 / 6–4 / 0–6	(Spain) Lorena Rufo (Spain) Marta Talaván	
21/2/2023	(Italy) Emily Stellato (Italy) Giulia Sussarello	5–7 / 2–6	(Spain) Beatriz Caldera (Spain) Carmen Goenaga	
21/2/2023	(Spain) Majo Sánchez Alayeto (Spain) Mapi Sánchez Alayeto	6–3 / 4–6 / 6–2	(Argentina) Delfina Brea (Portugal) Sofia Araújo	
21/2/2023	(Portugal) Ana Catarina Nogueira (Spain) Eli Amatriaín	3–6 / 3–6	(Argentina) Aranza Osoro (Spain) Lucía Sainz	
21/2/2023	(Spain) Marina Martínez Lobo (Spain) Teresa Navarro	2–6 / 4–6	(Sweden) Carolina Navarro (Spain) Mª Carmen Villalba	
21/2/2023	(Spain) Ana Fernandéz de Ossó (Spain) Lara Arruabarrena	1–6 / 1–6	(Spain) Bea González (Spain) Marta Ortega	
21/2/2023	(Spain) Alicia Blanco (Spain) Arantxa Soriano	1–6 / 3–6	(Argentina) Claudia Jensen (Spain) Jessica Castelló	
22/2/2023	(Spain) Victoria Iglesias Segador (Spain) Patty Llaguno	6–1 / 6–1	(Spain) Lorena Alonso (Spain) Sandra Hernández Camacho	
22/2/2023	(Spain) Esther Carnicero (Spain) Lucía Martínez	2–6 / 6–7	(Spain) Araceli Martínez (Spain) Noa Cánovas	
22/2/2023	(Spain) Marina Guinart (Spain) Nuria Rodríguez	2–6 / 5–7	(Spain) Carolina Orsi (France) Léa Godallier	
22/2/2023	(Spain) Claudia Fernández (Argentina) Julieta Bidahorria	4–6 / 1–6	(Spain) Tamara Icardo (Argentina) Virginia Riera	
22/02/2023	(Spain) Alejandra Alonso (Spain) Melania Merino	7–6 / 3–6 / 3–6	(France) Alix Collombon (Spain) Carla Mesa	
22/02/2023	(Spain) Agueda Pérez (Spain) Sara Ruiz	7–5 / 6–3	(Italy) Giorgia Marchetti (Brazil) Raquel Piltcher	
22/02/2023	(United Arab Emirates) Aisha Alawadhi (United Arab Emirates) Alia Taher	0–6 / 0–6	(Spain) Ariana Sánchez (Spain) Paula Josemaría	
22/2/2023	(Spain) Bárbara Las Heras (Spain) Verónica Virseda	6–1 / 6–0	(Spain) Marta Barrera (Spain) Marta Caparrós	

=== Round of 16 ===
Men's

Date	Winners	Score	Opponent	Refs.
23/2/2023	(Spain) Alejandro Ruiz (Spain) Momo González	3–6 / 6–0 / 4–6	(Spain) José García Diestro (Spain) Pincho Fernández	
23/2/2023	(Spain) Iván Ramírez (Spain) Pablo Cardona	6–2 / 6–3	(Argentina) Federico Chingotto (Spain) Javi Garrido	
23/2/2023	(Spain) Marc Quílez (Spain) Toni Bueno	3–6 / 2–6	(Argentina) Agustín Tapia (Spain) Arturo Coello	
23/2/2023	(Spain) Gonzalo Rubio (Spain) Javier Ruiz	6–7 / 6–2 / 6–2	(Spain) Javier Rico (Spain) Jorge Ruiz	
23/2/2023	(Argentina) Agustín Gomez Silingo (Spain) Juan Martín Díaz	4–6 / 4–6	(Argentina) Fernando Belasteguín (Argentina) Sanyo Gutiérrez	
23/2/2023	(Argentina) Franco Stupaczuk (Argentina) Martín Di Nenno	6–3 / 7–6	(Spain) Mario del Castillo (Spain) Miguel Benítez	
23/2/2023	(Spain) Alejandro Galán (Spain) Juan Lebrón	3–6 / 6–3 / 6–2	(Spain) Alejandro Arroyo (Spain) Miguel Yanguas	
23/2/2023	(Spain) Ignacio Vilariño (Spain) Jaime Muñoz	3–6 / 2–6	(Spain) Coki Nieto (Brazil) Pablo Lima	

Women's

Date	Winners	Score	Opponent	Refs.
23/2/2023	(Spain) Alejandra Salazar (Spain) Gemma Triay	6–4 / 6–4	(Spain) Lorena Rufo (Spain) Marta Talaván	
23/2/2023	(Spain) Patty Llaguno (Spain) Victoria Iglesias	6–1 / 6–2	(Spain) Carolina Orsi (France) Léa Godallier	
23/2/2023	(Sweden) Carolina Navarro (Spain) Mª Carmen Villalba	6–4 / 2–6 / 2–6	(Argentina) Aranza Osoro (Spain) Lucía Sainz	
23/2/2023	(Argentina) Claudia Jensen (Spain) Jessica Castelló	4–6 / 6–4 / 6–3	(Spain) Bea González (Spain) Marta Ortega	
23/2/2023	(France) Alix Collombon (Spain) Carla Mesa	3–6 / 0–6	(Spain) Tamara Icardo (Argentina) Virginia Riera	
23/2/2023	(Spain) Majo Sánchez Alayeto (Spain) Mapi Sánchez Alayeto	7–6 / 6–1	(Spain) Beatriz Caldera (Spain) Carmen Goenaga	
23/2/2023	(Spain) Araceli Martínez (Spain) Noa Cánovas	0–6 / 1–6	(Spain) Ariana Sánchez (Spain) Paula Josemaría	
23/2/2023	(Spain) Bárbara Las Heras (Spain) Verónica Virseda	6–0 / 6–2	(Spain) Águeda Pérez (Spain) Sara Ruiz	

=== Quarter-finals ===
Men's

Date	Winners	Score	Opponent	Refs.
24/2/2023	(Spain) Gonzalo Rubio (Spain) Javier Ruiz González	6–4 / 2–6 / 6–2	(Spain) Iván Ramírez (Spain) Pablo Cardona	
24/2/2023	(Spain) José García Diestro (Spain) Pincho Fernández	2–6 / 4–6	(Argentina) Agustín Tapia (Spain) Arturo Coello	
24/2/2023	(Argentina) Franco Stupaczuk (Argentina) Martín Di Nenno	6–3 / 6–3	(Argentina) Fernando Belasteguín (Argentina) Sanyo Gutiérrez	
24/2/2023	(Spain) Alejandro Galán (Spain) Juan Lebrón	6–4 / 6–1	(Spain) Coki Nieto (Brazil) Pablo Lima	

Women's

Date	Winners	Score	Opponent	Refs.
24/2/2023	(Spain) Alejandra Salazar (Spain) Gemma Triay	6–4 / 6–2	(Argentina) Aranza Osoro (Spain) Lucía Sainz	
24/2/2023	(Spain) Majo Sánchez Alayeto (Spain) Mapi Sánchez Alayeto	4–6 / 6–7	(Argentina) Claudia Jensen (Spain) Jessica Castelló	
24/2/2023	(Spain) Bárbara Las Heras (Spain) Verónica Virseda	4–6 / 3–6	(Spain) Ariana Sánchez (Spain) Paula Josemaría	
24/2/2023	(Spain) Patty Llaguno (Spain) Victoria Iglesias	2–6 / 0–6	(Spain) Tamara Icardo (Argentina) Virginia Riera	

=== Semi-Finals ===
Men's

Date	Winners	Score	Opponent	Refs.
25/2/2023	(Spain) Gonzalo Rubio (Spain) Javier Ruiz	2–6 / 3–6	(Argentina) Agustín Tapia (Spain) Arturo Coello	
25/2/2023	(Argentina) Franco Stupaczuk (Argentina) Martín Di Nenno	7–5 / 4–6 / 3–6	(Spain) Alejandro Galán (Spain) Juan Lebrón	

Women's

Date	Winners	Score	Opponent	Refs.
25/2/2023	(Spain) Alejandra Salazar (Spain) Gemma Triay	6–4 / 6–2	(Argentina) Claudia Jensen (Spain) Jessica Castelló	
25/2/2023	(Spain) Ariana Sánchez (Spain) Paula Josemaría	6–2 / 6–1	(Spain) Tamara Icardo (Argentina) Virginia Riera	

=== Finals ===
Date / Winners / Score / Opponent / Refs.; 26/2/2023 / (Argentina) Agustín Tapia (Spain) Arturo Coello / 7–6 / 6–3 / (Spain) Alejandro Galán (Spain) Juan Lebrón	Date / Winners / Score / Opponent / Refs.; 26/2/2023 / (Spain) Ariana Sánchez (Spain) Paula Josemaría / 6–3 / 6–3 / (Spain) Alejandra Salazar (Spain) Gemma Triay
