= José de Santiago Concha Jiménez Lobatón =

Royal Governor of Chile (1765–1830)

José de Santiago Concha Jiménez Lobatón (1765–1830) was interim Governor of Chile from April 1801 to December 1801. Before and after his governorship, he served as Oidor of the Real Audiencia of Santiago between 1795 and 1811 and from 1815 to 1818.

Government offices
Preceded by Joaquín del Pino	Royal Governor of Chile; 1801	Succeeded by Francisco Tadeo Díez de Medina Vidanges
