= Governor of Montevideo =

The office of Governor of Montevideo was created shortly after the Treaty of Madrid in 1750 by Ferdinand VI of Spain, with the objective of establishing more effective control of the Banda Oriental (left bank) area of the Río de la Plata, present day Uruguay.

The Banda Oriental had been awarded to Spain as a term of the Treaty of Madrid. It was within the Viceroyalty of Peru (1750−1776), the Viceroyalty of the Río de la Plata (colonial Argentina region, 1776−1814) and the United Provinces of the Río de la Plata (independent Argentina region, 1814−1815).

== History ==
The constant threat of the Portuguese Empire expanding from Colonial Brazil westward into the region was virtually impossible to deter, due to the lack of permanent Spanish settlement along the frontier. This, coupled with the possibility of attacks by the indigenous peoples defending their homelands and perhaps motivated by the Portuguese, convinced the Spanish Crown to establish this new jurisdiction in the recently founded city of Montevideo.

Despite the fact that Montevideo was in those days a small village of minor significance, military considerations took precedence. The city's importance was soon elevated by its regional strategic value.

At its creation, the jurisdiction's direct control did not extend beyond 70 kilometres (43 mi) (two days on a horse). This zone was, in fact, the only area brought under effective royal control in the Banda Oriental.

=== Viceroyalty of the Río de la Plata governors ===
The governors of Montevideo between 1751 and 1814 were:

- José Joaquín de Viana (1751–1764)
- Agustín de la Rosa (1764–1771)
- José Joaquín de Viana (1771–1773)
- Joaquín del Pino y Rozas (1773–1790)
- Antonio de Olaguer y Feliú (1790–1797)
- José de Bustamante y Guerra (1797–1804)
- Pascual Ruiz Huidobro (1804–1807)

On February 3, 1807, British forces occupied Montevideo, deposing and taking prisoner Governor Ruiz Huidobro. The British held the city until September 9, 1807, when it was recaptured by Spain. The office of Governor was subsequently reestablished:

- Francisco Javier de Elío (1807–1810)
- Joaquín de Soria (April to October 1810)
- Gaspar de Vigodet (spelled "Bigodé" in contemporary documents) (1810–1814)

=== United Provinces of the Río de la Plata governors ===
On June 23, 1814, Argentine and Uruguayan troops under the command of Carlos María de Alvear entered Montevideo, ending Spanish colonial control of the city. The Supreme Directorate of the United Provinces of the Río de la Plata, the revolutionary government of the Río de la Plata, maintained the office of governor of Montevideo, designating its successors:

- Nicolás Rodríguez Peña (July to August, 1814)
- Miguel Estanislao Soler (August, 1814 to February, 1815)

On February 25, 1815, Argentine troops abandoned Montevideo to the forces of José Gervasio Artigas, who designated two delegate governors during his rule of Uruguay. These were the last two officials to hold the title:

- Fernando Otorgués (February to July, 1815)
- Miguel Barreiro (July, 1815 to January, 1817)

The office came to an end with the second Portuguese invasion of Uruguay in July 1816.
