= Ana de Azcuénaga de Olaguer Feliú =

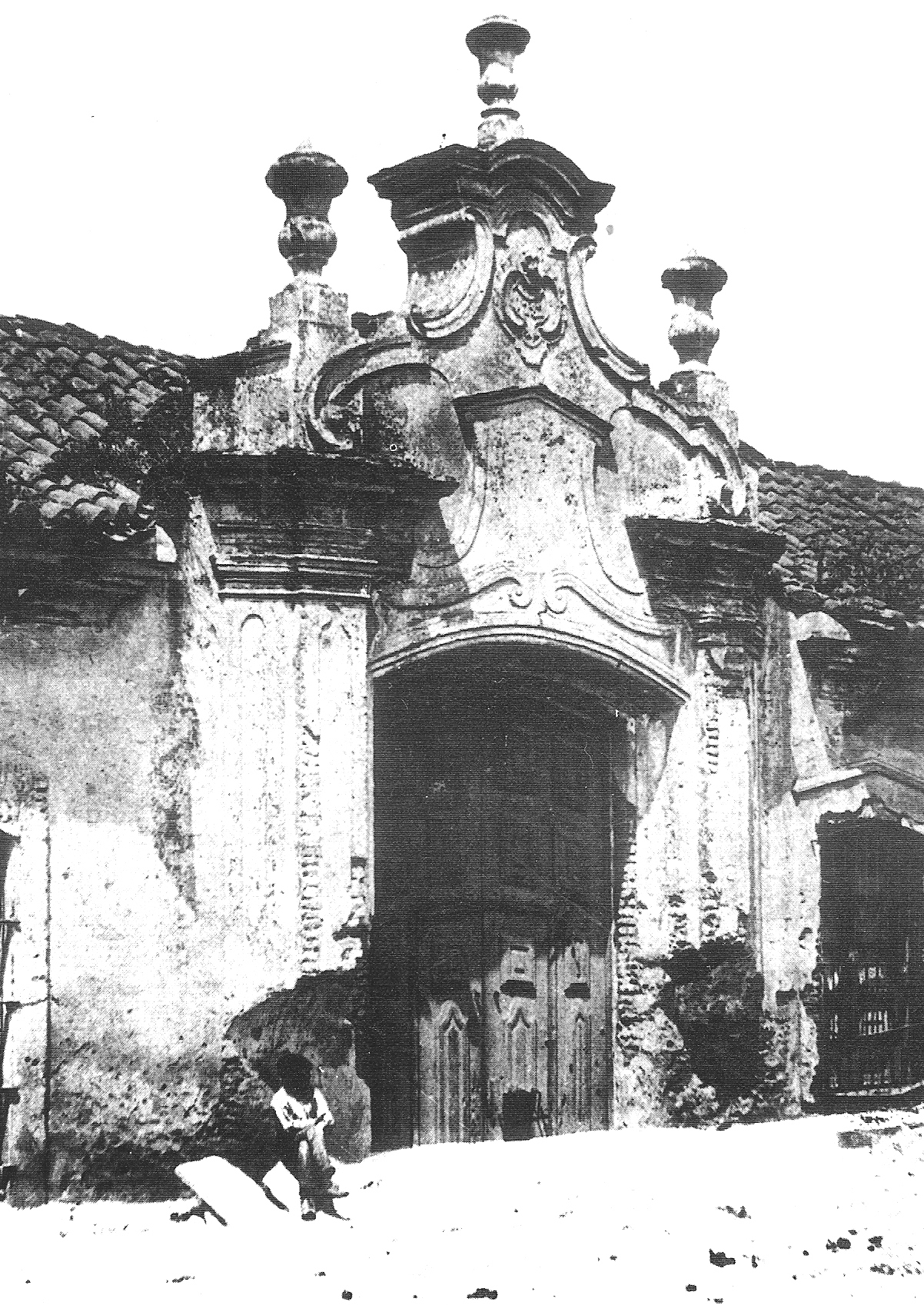

Ana de Azcuénaga de Olaguer Feliú (1770–1845), was Vicereine of Río de la Plata in 1797–1799 by marriage to viceroy Antonio Olaguer Feliú. She became the first in that position ever to have been born in Argentina rather than a Spanish woman.

== Life ==
She was the daughter of Rosa Basavilbaso and Vicente de Azcuénaga and belonged to the most powerful families in Argentina. As vicereine, it was her task to play the ceremonial role of first lady at the vice-regal court, which was modeled after the vice-regal court at Lima. In 1802, she settled with her spouse in Spain, where she often appeared at the royal court.
