= Francisco Gil de Taboada =

Spanish naval officer and colonial administrator

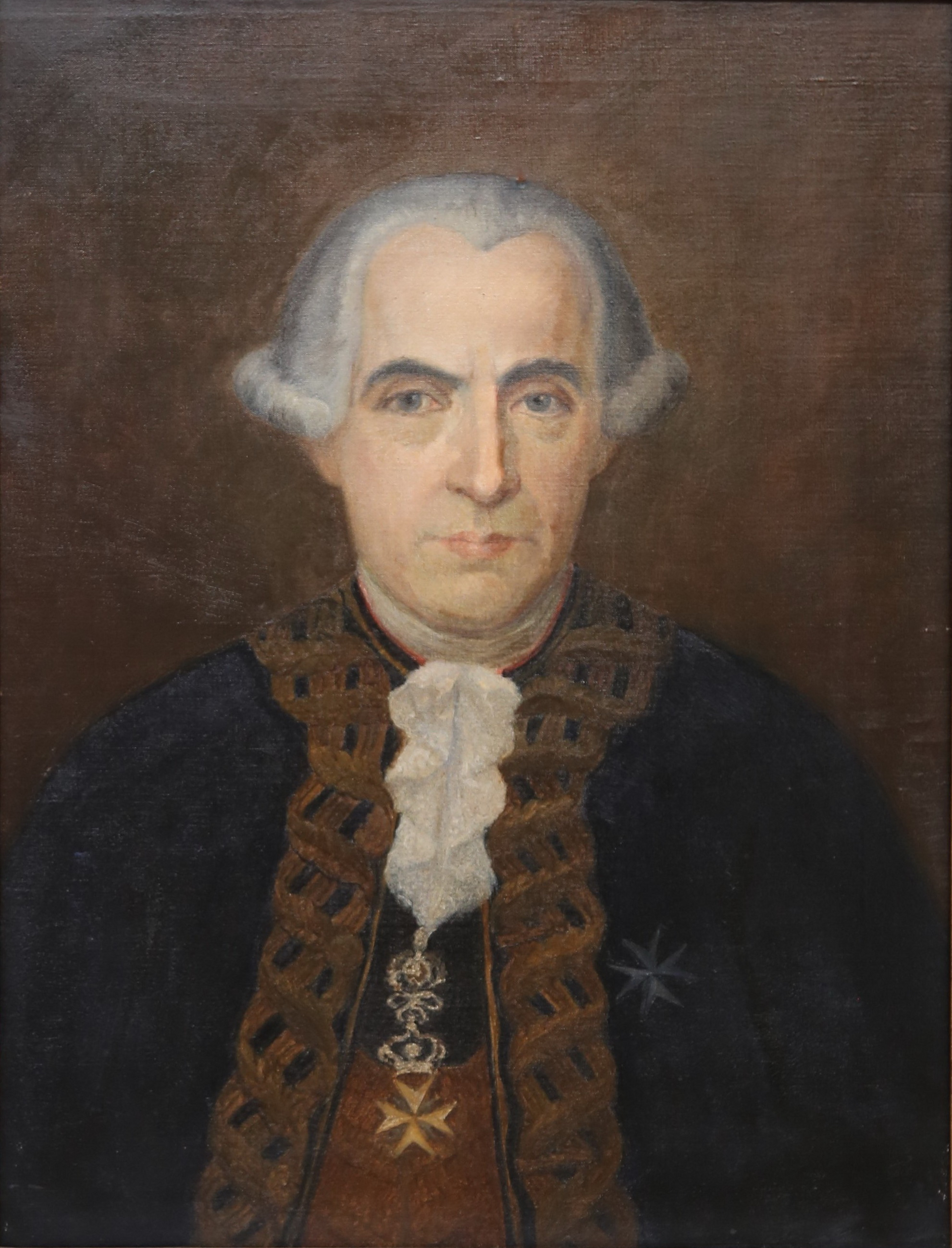
Francisco Gil de Taboada, Viceroy of New Granada and Viceroy of Peru

Francisco Gil de Taboada y Lemos (in full Francisco Gil de Taboada y de Lemos y Vila Marín) (September 24, 1733 in Santa María de Souto Longo, Galicia, Spain – 1809 in Madrid) was a Galician Spanish naval officer and colonial administrator in South America. He was briefly viceroy of New Granada in 1789, and from March 25, 1790 to June 6, 1796 he was viceroy of Peru. After his viceregal service he returned to Spain, where he became a member of the governing junta after King Ferdinand VII was forced to abdicate by Napoleon. He was director general of the Spanish Royal Navy.

== Background ==
Francisco Gil de Taboada y Lemos was born in 1733 (some sources say 1736 or 1737) in Galicia, Spain.

He became a knight of the Order of St. John of Jerusalem at age 16. He entered the navy as a cadet at Cádiz on October 27, 1752. He was promoted to lieutenant de navio September 3, 1767. During this period he sailed the Mediterranean, the Atlantic and the Pacific.

He was promoted to commander in 1770 and to captain in 1776. From January 5, 1774 to February 1, 1777 he was Spanish governor of the Malvinas Islands (Falklands). On February 17, 1779 he was named captain of the recently created Company of Naval Cadets of the Department of Ferrol. He remained in this position until he was appointed viceroy and captain general of New Granada and president of the Audiencia of Santa Fe de Bogotá by Antonio Valdez, minister of the Indies (1788). By this time he was commander of a squadron.

== As viceroy of New Granada ==
He took up his new position in January 1789, and served there only until July, when he was named viceroy of Peru and president of the Audiencia of Lima. On March 4, 1789 he was promoted to lieutenant general.

== As viceroy of Peru ==
In Peru he introduced administrative reforms, encouraged literature and the arts, and sent out exploring expeditions.

In addition to being a career naval officer who had fought in Algeria, Normandy, Gibraltar and Sicily, Gil de Taboada was also a man of letters. In Peru, he was distinguished by his support for the arts, as well as science and exploration. He supported the foundation of the newspaper El Mercurio Peruano in 1791 and founded the Academy of Fine Arts. He founded an anatomy center and a hospital, supported the navigation school and ordered the first census of the population. In 1796, he also reincorporated the region of Puno into the Viceroyalty of Peru.

At the end of his term as viceroy in 1796 he returned to Spain. There he was subject to a juicio de residencia (grievance tribunal) to investigate the state of the colonial finances during his administration. (This was very common at the end of viceregal administrations in the Spanish overseas colonies.) The verdict was in his favor.

== Back in Spain ==
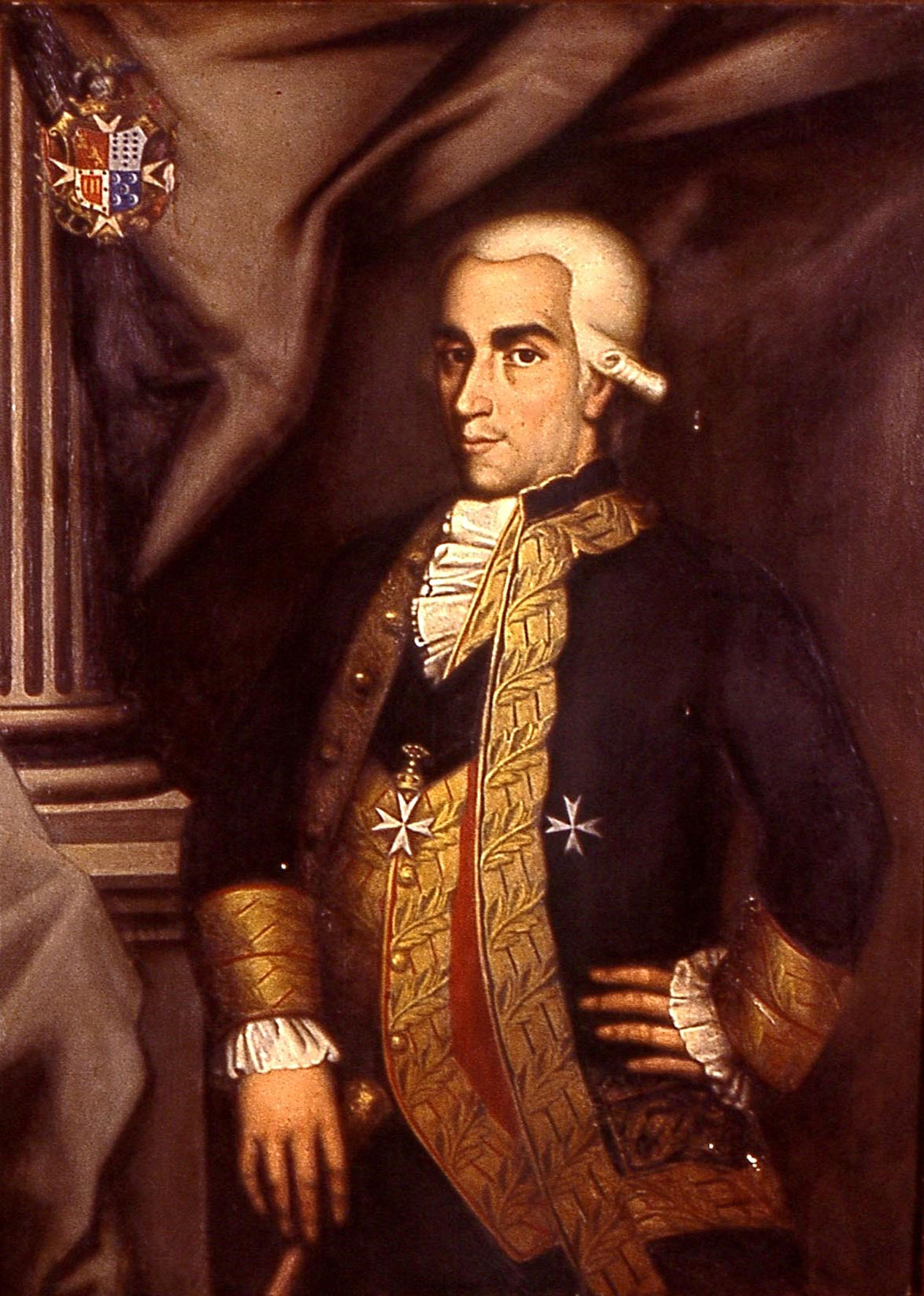
Francisco Gil de Taboada

In 1799 he was named director general of the navy, a position he occupied simultaneously with other high positions until 1807.

On February 6, 1805, upon the appointment of General Domingo Grandallana as commander of the squadron at el Ferrol, Gil de Taboada was named interim secretary of state and of the navy. In November of that year he was promoted to captain general in the navy. On April 22, 1806 he was named minister of the navy (no longer on an interim basis).

These high positions were held under the authority of King Charles IV. On March 17, 1808 the Mutiny of Aranjuez forced Charles to abdicate and turn over the government to his son, Ferdinand VII. The rioters at Aranjuez also attacked the hated Prime Minister Manuel de Godoy. This and the events that followed directly on it changed everything in Spanish politics, and had enormous repercussions in the Spanish colonies in the Americas.

== As a member of the governing junta ==
The governing ministers, including Gil de Taboada, were confirmed in their positions by Ferdinand.

On the invitation of Napoleon, both Charles and Ferdinand left Spain for France, crossing the border on April 21, 1808. They arrived in Bayonne, where Napoleon forced them to abdicate and claimed the Spanish crown, which he gave to his brother Joseph I of Naples. It was the beginning of a seven-year exile for the Spanish kings.

Before leaving for Bayonne, Ferdinand VII had formed a ruling junta (Junta Suprema de Gobierno) composed of his ministers and presided by Infante Antonio, uncle of Fernando VII. Gil de Taboada was still minister of the navy. When Joachim Murat demanded that Godoy (held in the Castle of Villaviciosa since his deposition) be turned over to the French, Gil strongly opposed the suggestion.

Fearing the French encroachment, Gil proposed moving the junta of ministers away from Madrid. Infante Antonio, the day after the popular explosion of the Second of May, was forced to join Charles and Ferdinand in Bayonne. Antonio wrote to Gil that the junta should continue as it had been, but Murat demanded to preside over it. Most of the members accepted this on May 4, but Gil did not. He turned in his resignation a few days later.

After the Battle of Bailén (July 18–22, 1808), in which the French were defeated and forced to withdraw from Madrid, Gil de Taboada was again sworn in as a member of a governing junta, this time the Junta Suprema Central. This occurred on September 29, 1808 in Aranjuez. When the French reoccupied the capital, they required an oath of allegiance to Joseph Bonaparte, as King Joseph I of Spain. Gil, now an octogenarian, refused. There were calls that he be prosecuted for his refusal, but Joseph rejected that, saying that such a valiant old man should not be molested.

When Gil de Taboada died the following year, the French garrison of Madrid accorded him the funeral honors of a man of high dignity.

Government offices
Preceded by Antonio Caballero y Góngora	Viceroy of New Granada; 1789	Succeeded by José Manuel de Ezpeleta
Preceded by Teodoro de Croix	Viceroy of Peru; 1790–1796	Succeeded by Ambrosio O'Higgins
