= Francisco Gil =

Francisco Gil may refer to:

- Francisco Gil de Taboada (born 1736), Spanish naval officer
- Francisco Gil Craviotto (1933–2024), Spanish writer, journalist and translator
- Francisco Gil Hellín (1940–2025), Spanish Roman Catholic prelate, archbishop of Burgos in 2002–2015
- Francisco Gil Díaz (born 1943), Mexican economist
- Francisco Gil Villegas (born 1953), Mexican academic
- Francisco Gil (footballer) (born 2000), Argentine forward for Club Atlético Brown
