= José de Rezabal y Ugarte =

José de Rezabal y Ugarte (1747–1800) was a Spanish lawyer and judge and jurist. He was born in Vitoria on July 19, 1800 and died in Santiago, Chile. He served as President of the Real Audiencia of Santiago (1792-1800) and as Spanish governor of Chile, on an interim basis, from 24 May to 18 September 1796.
As judge and mayor over crime in Lima in 1781, he led the case against Túpac Amaru II, writing the judgment which condemned to death by hanging him and several of his followers, as well as penalties in prisons in Africa, Callao and Valdivia for many others.

== Education and career ==
He studied law at the University of Granada and the University of Valladolid. He was rector of the Colegio Mayor del Arzobispo of Salamanca in 1766, 1768 and 1770. He taught Instituta at the University of Salamanca.

=== Chile ===
Already a doctor of law, between 1778 and 1780 he served as judge of the Real Audiencia of Chile. He was very active in this colony. He worked as an inspector of the works of the Santiago de Chile Cathedral, as Senior Judge over deceased property, as the protector of Convictorio Carolino and the Provincial Women's Hospital. He was known to own a small print shop for his private use, apparently the first or second operated in this country.

=== Peru ===
In 1781 de Rezabal y Ugarte was transferred to Lima to work as Mayor of crime. In this new destination he led the case against Túpac Amaru II, for the uprising that he had spearheaded. The decision in this case was published in 1783 by colonial order. de Rezabal y Ugarte also led other causes connected with this case, including another trial against Manuel Antonio Figueroa, called El Incognito.

While in Peru, de Rezabal y Ugarte occupied all kinds of positions, such as Director Royal of Studies at the University of San Marcos, Proprietary Judge and Dean Judge of the new Real Audiencia of Cuzco in 1786. This last position was not occupied at first as it was intended for the complicated trial prompted by the collapse which occurred at the mine in Huancavelica that year, killing 200 people. In that case the proceedings focused on embezzlement charges against the director of the institution, Francisco Marroquín.

He married in 1787 to Jane Catherine Micheo y Jiménez de Lobaton.

After taking on such notorious causes he aspired to fill a vacancy for judge of the Real Audiencia of Lima without much success, so he decided to hold the office of judge that was awaiting him in Cuzco in 1791.

== Work as governor ==
During his brief four-month governing he continued the work of Tajamares del Mapocho, originally initiated by the outgoing governor Ambrosio O'Higgins. According to Diego Barros Arana it was de Rezabal y Ugarte who planted the poplar grove that ran along these river defenses, which was the only public promenade in the city of Santiago for over 30 years.

== Works ==
- Tratado del derecho real de medias-anatas seculares y del servicio de lanzas a que estan obligados los titulos de Castilla, Madrid, 1792.
- Adiciones y suplementos de la Biblioteca Hispanica histórico-genealógica-heráldica de Ernesto de Franckenau.
- Instruccion para los Alcaldes de quarteles y de barrio, en la que se recopilan los bandos de policía y buen gobierno, que se habían publicado en este siglo.
- De los recursos de fuerza de los Regulares de Indias
- Disertación sobre el interés legal.
- Compendio alfabético de más de dos mil Reales ordenes y cedulas expedidas para el gobierno de America, posteriores a la recopilación de leyes de Indias.
- Resumen genealogico instrumental de las casas Ximenez de Lobaton, Salazar Muñatones, Azaña y otras, que estan unida.
- Disertacion sobre las monedas de que hablan las leyes de Indias.
- Tratado politico-legal sobre el origen de la introduccion de los negros en las Americas españolas, sus utilidades y desventajas, su gobierno, policia y costumbres.
- Politica de los Regentes de las Reales audiencias de ambas Americas, é islas Filipinas.
- Biblioteca de los escritores que han sido individuos de los Seis Colegios mayores, Madrid, 1805.
- Nueva Política Indiana a similitud de la del señor Solórzano, adaptada a las presentes circunstancias, con que en mucha parte ha variado la Legislación Municipal con la Institución de Intendencias, de Regencias, ordenanzas respectivas, nueva planta de los Consulados, y ramo de minería, supresión de repartos, subdelegaciones, Lost and unpublished.
