= Presidency of Simón Bolívar in the Third Republic of Venezuela =

Flag of the Third Republic of Venezuela

The presidency of Simón Bolívar in the Third Republic of Venezuela (1816–1819) was constituted during the War of Independence against the Spanish Empire following the successful Guayana campaign.

The provisional capital of the country was Angostura. Defense policy included the reception of the British Legions for the war. At the legislative level, the Second Congress of Venezuela (Congress of Angostura) was held in 1819. Economic policy included the confiscation of property of royalists and their collaborators. The government's communication policy was featured in the newspaper Correo del Orinoco.

After the unification of Venezuela and New Granada, Bolívar continued his mandate, now as president of Gran Colombia.

== Background ==
The Guyana Campaign of 1816–1817 was the second campaign carried out by the Venezuelan patriots in the Venezuelan War of Independence in the Guayana region after the 1811–1812 campaign that had ended in disaster. The campaign was a great success for the republicans, who managed, after several battles, to expel all royalists from the region, thereby taking control of an area rich in natural resources and communication facilities that served as a base for launching campaigns to other regions of the country.

== Domestic policy ==
On May 6, 1816, Bolívar was proclaimed Supreme Chief of the Republic and its armies in Margarita by the assembly held there with Santiago Mariño, Juan Bautista Arismendi, Manuel Piar, Gregor McGregor, and Carlos Soublette.

=== Legislative policy ===
==== Congress of Angostura ====
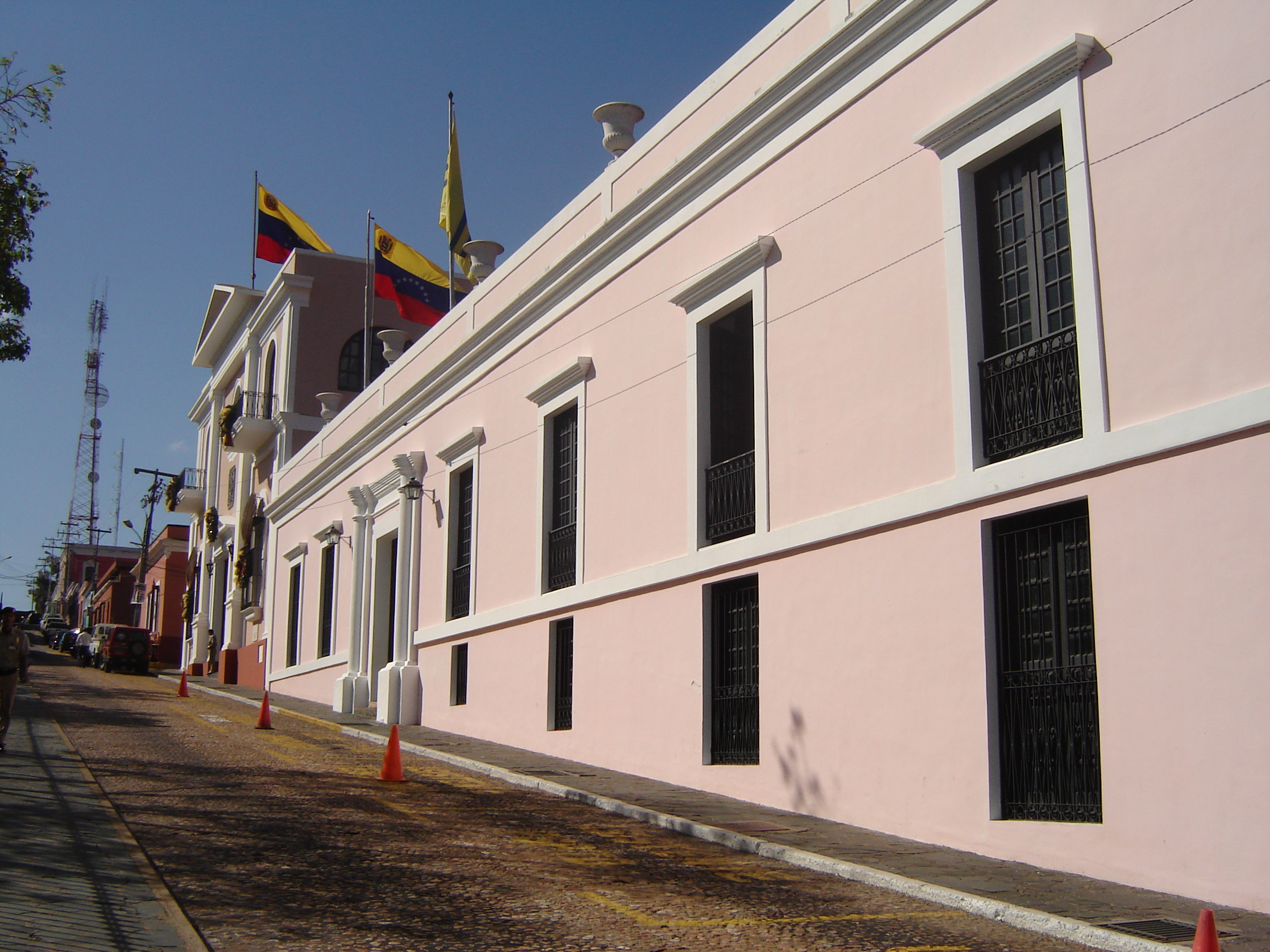
House of the Congress of Angostura

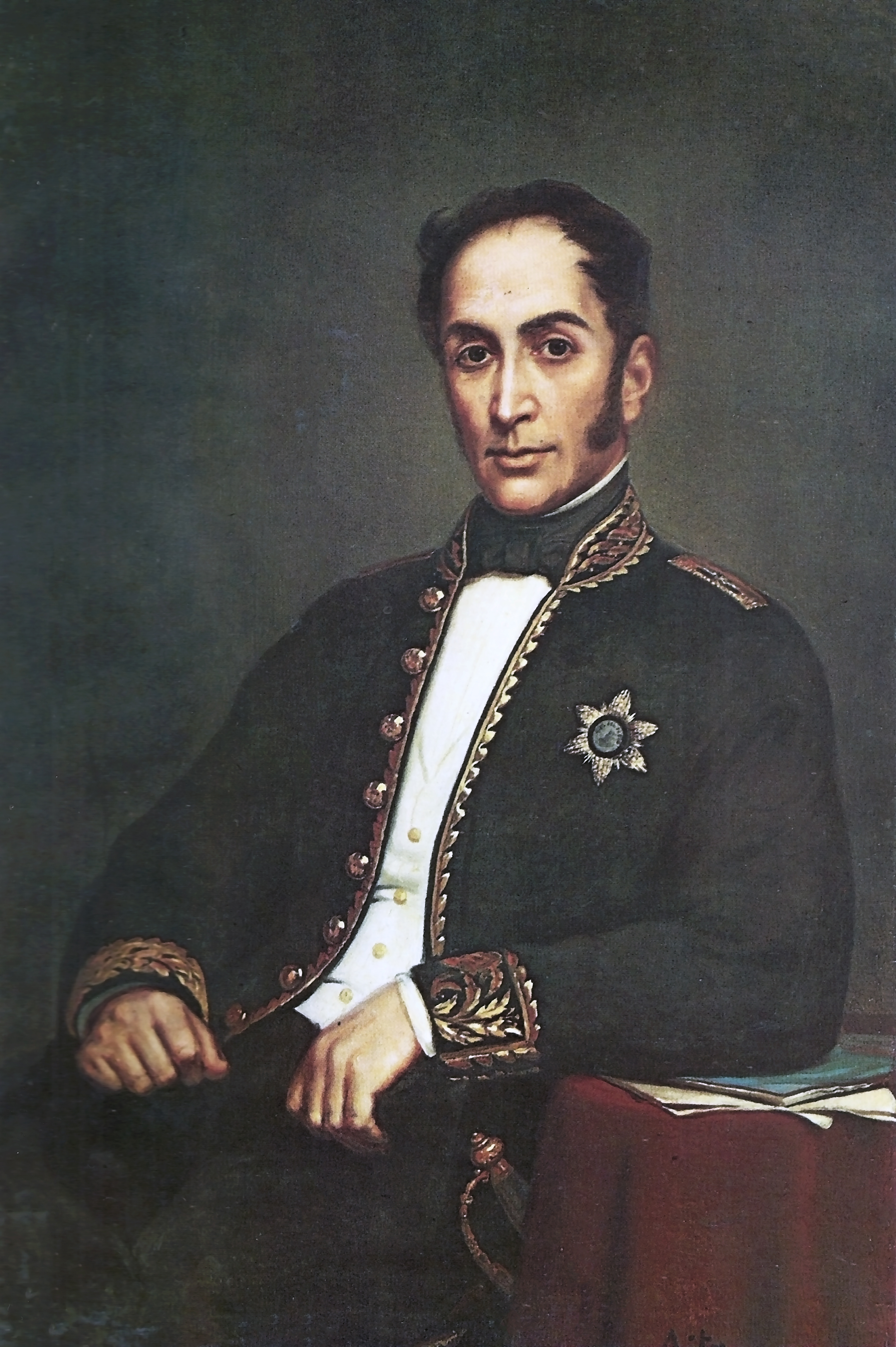
Simón Bolívar

The Congress of Angostura was convened by Simón Bolívar and took place in Angostura (today Ciudad Bolívar) during the wars of independence of Colombia and Venezuela, culminating in the proclamation of the Republic of Colombia (historiographically called Gran Colombia). It met from February 15, 1819, established the new independent-from-Spain nation on December 17, was interrupted by further independentist activity, and reconvened on July 31, 1821, when the Congress of Cúcuta began its sessions. The Angostura assembly consisted of twenty-six delegates representing Venezuela and New Granada (today Colombia).

=== Appointments ===
The republic's leadership contained a Council of State. Bolívar appointed Francisco Antonio Zea councillor of state and finance, Luis Brión councillor of the navy and military, and Juan Martínez Alemán councillor of interior and justice.

=== Defense ===
Simón Bolívar created by decree on September 24, 1817, the Divisional and Army General Staffs. On October 10 of that year, Bolívar decreed in Angostura the award of lands to military chiefs and soldiers of the war of independence. On October 13, it was guaranteed to the indigenous people that they would not be asked to perform compulsory service in exchange for being submissive and obedient.

=== Social policy ===
Bolívar decreed the freedom of slaves on June 2, 1816.

=== Economics ===
Simón Bolívar decreed on September 3, 1817, the confiscation of property of royalists and their collaborators; the estates and properties of the Capuchins and other missionaries, and the property seized from patriots by the Spanish government until the former owners appeared and it was determined whether their conduct had been patriotic. The Capuchins, fundamentally the Catalans, who were in Guayana, were accused of being royalists. In 1817, Bolívar decreed free trade in cattle and mules.

=== Media policy ===
On June 27, 1818, the officialist weekly Correo del Orinoco was created.

=== Immigration ===
On February 7, 1818, Simón Bolívar exempted foreigners from being enlisted in the national militia without their consent.

== Foreign policy ==
=== British Empire ===
The British Legion (Spanish: Legión británica) or British Legions (Legiones británicas) were foreign volunteer units which fought under Simón Bolívar against Spain for the independence of Colombia, Venezuela, and Ecuador, and under José de San Martín for the independence of Peru, in the Spanish American wars of independence. Venezuelans generally called them the Albion Legion. They were composed of over seven thousand volunteers, mainly Napoleonic War veterans from Great Britain and Ireland, as well as some German veterans and some locals recruited after arriving in South America. Volunteers in the British Legion were motivated by a combination of both genuine political conviction and mercenary motives.

Their greatest achievements were at the Boyacá (1819), Carabobo (1821), Pichincha (1822) and Battle of Ayacucho (1824) which secured independence for Colombia, Venezuela, Ecuador and Peru from Spanish rule respectively.

=== Spanish Empire ===
==== Campaign of the Center ====
The Campaign of the Center was a military campaign undertaken by Simón Bolívar with the aim of conquering the city of Caracas.

==== Apure Campaign ====
The Apure Campaign was a military campaign of the Venezuelan War of Independence fought in 1819.

==== New Granada Campaign ====
Bolívar's campaign to liberate New Granada, also known as the Liberation Campaign of 1819, was part of the Colombian and Venezuelan wars of independence and was one of the many military campaigns fought by Simón Bolívar. In 1819 Bolívar led a combined New Granadan and Venezuelan Army in a campaign to liberate New Granada which had been under Spanish control since 1816.

Bolívar marched his army through the flooded plains from Venezuela and entered the Casanare Province with his army in June 1819, combining his forces with those of Francisco de Paula Santander at Tame, Arauca, on 11 June. The combined Patriot force reached the Eastern Range of the Andes on 22 June and began a grueling crossing. On 6 July, the Patriots descended from the Andes arriving at Socha and into the valleys of central New Granada. After a brief convalescence, the Patriots fought a series of battles against the III Division of the Royalist army of Spanish colonel José María Barreiro Manjón, with the campaign culminating at the decisive Battle of Boyacá, where Bolivar's forces routed and dismantled the Royalist Army entering Santa Fe de Bogotá triumphantly 3 days later.

Bolivar's victory in New Granada (today: Colombia, Venezuela, Ecuador and Panama) secured the eventual independence of northern South America. It provided Bolívar with the economic and human resources to complete his victory over the Spanish in Venezuela and Colombia.

Bolívar's New Granada campaign is considered one of the most daring in military history, compared by contemporaries and some historians to Hannibal's or Napoleon's crossing of the Alps in 1800 and José San Martín's Crossing of the Andes in 1817.

== See also ==
- Third Republic of Venezuela
