= Fernando Peñalver =

Venezuelan revolutionary (1765–1837)

Governor of Carabobo Province

Member of the Congress of Cúcuta

Personal details
- Born: 1765 Píritu, Viceroyalty of New Granada, Spanish Empire
- Died: May 7, 1837 (aged 71–72) Valencia, Venezuela
- Resting place: National Pantheon of Venezuela

Fernando Peñalver (1765 – May 7, 1837) was a neogranadan politician, jurist and leader in the Venezuelan War of Independence. He joined the revolutionary movement in 1810. In 1811, he represented Valencia city council at the Constitutuent Congress and signed the Declaration of Independence, as well as the Federal Constitution. In 1812, he was elected president of the Congress, which passed laws to abolish the Inquisition. Taken prisoner by Domingo de Monteverde, he was released in 1813. Emigrating to the Antilles, he continued correspondence with Simón Bolívar and sent arms and ammunition for the liberation campaign in Guayana. In 1817, he moved to Angostura where he became involved in politics and was a contributor to the Correo del Orinoco newspaper. He became a representative for the province of Guayana in the Congress of Angostura.

He was the first governor of the Province of Carabobo (1824–1827). He is buried in the National Pantheon of Venezuela.

== See also ==
- History of Venezuela
- Venezuelan War of Independence
- Military career of Simón Bolívar
- Spanish American wars of independence
