= American Confederation of Venezuela =

Former Venezuelan-unrecognized state

American Confederation of Venezuela Confederación Americana de Venezuela
- 1811–1819
- Flag Coat of arms

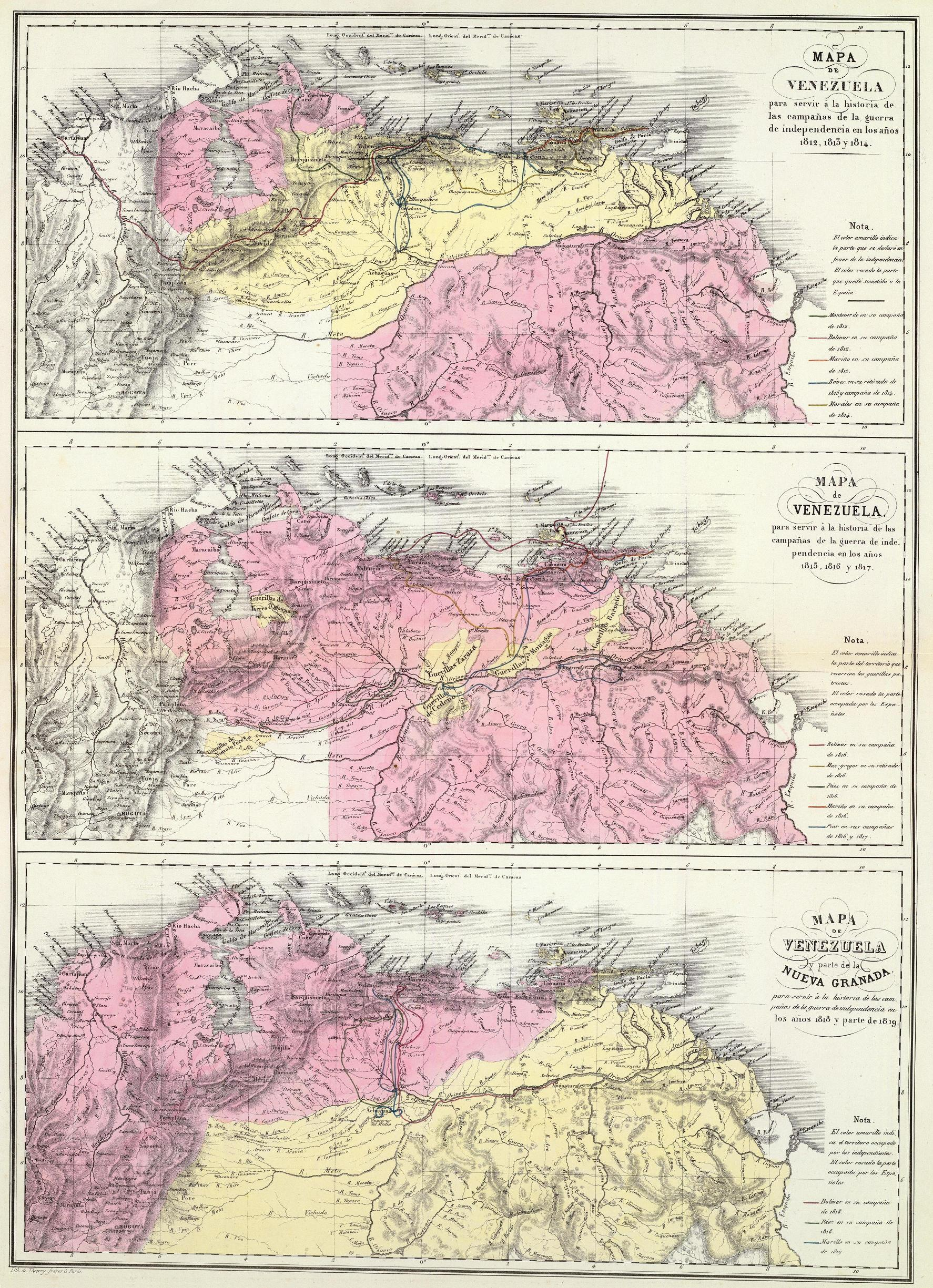
- Top to bottom: First, Second and Third Republic of Venezuela; Spanish territory Revolutionary territory
- Status: Unrecognized state
- Capital: Valencia (1811–1812); Caracas (1813–1814); Angostura (1817–1819)
- Common languages: Spanish
- Government: Confederation
  - Triumvirate: Cristóbal Mendoza, Juan Escalona, Baltazar Padrón (1811–12); Francisco Espejo, Fernando Rodriguez, Francisco J. Ustariz (1812)
  - President: Francisco de Miranda (1812)
- Historical era: Spanish American wars of independence
  - Venezuelan Declaration of Independence: 5 July 1811
  - Congress of Angostura: 17 December 1819
Preceded by	Succeeded by
Captaincy General of Venezuela; Supreme Junta	Gran Colombia

The American Confederation of Venezuela was an unrecognized state located in the Captaincy General of Venezuela of the Spanish Empire, which was organized by Venezuelan patriots following the Venezuelan Declaration of Independence.

== History ==
Due to its rebellious instability originating from the Venezuelan War of Independence, the confederation existed in three different stages depending on territory held by revolutionary or royalist forces. These are commonly known as the First Republic of Venezuela, Second Republic of Venezuela and the Third Republic of Venezuela.

=== First Republic of Venezuela ===
On 19 April 1810, the municipal council of Caracas deposed the Spanish Governor and Captain General, Vicente Emparán. The Supreme Junta was then established in Caracas, with civil war soon sparking throughout much of the Venezuelan territory. As the congress of the Junta gathered, a movement for independence gained popular support. Revolutionaries such as Francisco de Miranda, a Venezuelan expatriate, and Simón Bolívar, a Criollo aristocrat, led the independence movement. The Junta's congress declared Venezuela's independence on 5 July 1811, with seven of ten regions of the Captaincy General of Venezuela seceding and establishing the Confederación Americana de Venezuela (American Confederation of Venezuela).

The first actions by the revolutionary government involved the creation of free trade within Venezuela, which consolidated power among the upper-class aristocrats which led the confederation. Shortly after the establishment of the confederation, royalist sympathizers within the revolutionary territory began to plot the reinstallation of Spanish power in the region. Royalists began promising freedom and rights to black slaves, who held contempt toward the Criollo aristocrats who held power during the confederation. However, attempts to reestablish Spanish rule initially failed.

=== Second Republic of Venezuela ===
Flag

Coat of arms

Beginning in early 1813, revolutionaries again attempted to establish a republic within Venezuela independent from Spain. Leading the Admirable Campaign, Simón Bolívar organized troops from the United Provinces of New Granada to capture territory within Venezuela. Bolívar published the Decree of War to the Death on 15 June 1813, which resulted in the executions and killings of thousands of opponents to the revolution, including hospitalized individuals. Following the Battle of Taguanes, patriots enter Caracas on 3 August 1813.

Beginning in February 1814, royalist commander José Tomás Boves began a campaign to retake Venezuelan territory captured by revolutionaries, beginning the decline of the Second Republic of Venezuela. Following the Second Battle of La Puerta on 15 June 1814 which resulted in a royalist victory for Boves, Bolívar, his revolutionaries and more than twenty-thousand civilians fled Caracas during the Emigration to the East beginning on 7 July 1814. Following the Royalist victory in the Fifth Battle of Maturín on 11 December 1814, the Republic came to an end and Bolívar left to Jamaica.

=== Third Republic of Venezuela ===
Flag

Coat of arms

In 1816, Bolívar returned to liberate New Grenada and Venezuela. The Expedition of the Keys, led by Bolívar in the west, began the revolutionary push eastward. The Guayana Campaign, headed by Manuel Piar and others to the east, led to the establishment of institutions in Angostura in 1817, with the period of the Third Republic of Venezuela beginning at this time.

The period of the Third Republic came to an end in February 1819 during the Congress of Angostura, which eventually resulted with the establishment of Gran Colombia.
