= Juan Paz del Castillo =

Venezuelan general

- Born: September 19, c. 1776/1778; Caracas, New Granada, Spain
- Died: August 28, 1828 near Guayaquil, Colombia
- Military career
- Allegiance: Venezuela; Army of the Andes; Colombia; Peru
- Conflicts: Spanish American wars of independence

Juan Paz del Castillo y Díaz Padrón (Caracas; September 19, c. 1776/1778 — near Guayaquil; August 28, 1828) was a Venezuelan soldier who participated in the Venezuelan War of Independence, reaching the rank of Divisional general during the conflict.

== Biography ==
He was born on September 19—circa 1776 or 1778—in Caracas to Blas Francisco Paz del Castillo y Juana Isabel Díaz Padrón y Hernández Caraballo de Acosta, who were important people in Venezuela, then part of New Granada. In 1823, he married Micaela Llona, with whom he had three children.

He entered Caracas as Militia Captain on April 19, 1810. In December 1911 he was elected as deputy for San Sebastián before the Supreme Junta. In May 1812, already a Colonel, he fought against Royalist Eusebio Antoñanzas in the city of Calabozo. He later fought alongside Antonio Nicolás Briceño in Camatagua. He was Military Governor of Caracas, returning to the Army at his own request.

In 1812, after the First Republic of Venezuela was disestablished with the signing of the capitulation treaty in San Mateo, Paz del Castillo was imprisoned in La Guaira by Manuel María de las Casas and deported to Cádiz under the orders of Juan Domingo de Monteverde, where he arrived on November 19. He was sent to Ceuta on May 5, 1813, and briefly managed to escape to Gibraltar on February 17, 1814, with the assistance of Canon José Cortés de Madariaga, Doctor Juan Germán Roscio and Colonel Juan Pablo Ayala, but was deported back to Ceuta by the Duke of Kent, then governor of Gibraltar.

He was released after 20 months by Prince William Frederick, along with this companions, possibly thanking the government in London personally in November 1815. In 1816 he arrived to Jamaica and left for the Les Cayes, from where Simón Bolívar had launched an expedition to take Venezuela from the Spanish. Paz del Castillo had arrived by the time Bolívar had left, now leaving for New Spain with Roscio, where he arrived to Philadelphia. Once there, he heard of José de San Martín's success at Chacabuco, and left for Buenos Aires.

In January 1818 he joined the Army of the Andes, and as Jefe de Estado Mayor he fought in the Battle of Maipú and later substituted Brigadier Antonio Valcárcel as head of a division until May 1819. In 1820, he left for Peru with San Martín and his Liberating Expedition as Assistant Major General. Once in Lima, he left to find Bolívar, carrying an important mission from San Martín and the Venezuelans from the Numancia Battalion.

In July 1821, he was in Popayán, being named as Jefe de Estado Mayor by Venezuelan General Pedro León Torres shortly after. On December he was authorised by Bolívar to, alongside Lieutenant Colonel Pedro Murgueitio, carry out a prisoner exchange after a treaty was signed in Babahoyo. The following year, he was commissioned for the armistice that was signed with Melchor Aymerich. On April of the same year, he fought with Bolívar at the Battle of Bomboná, later continuing with General José de Jesús Barreto as his second-in-command. He returned from Popayán as the Chief of the division located there.

He was promoted to Brigadier General by Antonio José de Sucre for his actions in Quito, Guayaquil and Pichincha. After the Guayaquil Conference, he left for Peru with the Auxiliary Division. He successfully recruited foreign volunteers in Lima before leaving for Colombia, being lauded by Bolívar.

From January 1823 to 1824 he was put in charge of the Intendancy of Guayaquil, where he organised troops that were later of vital importance to the battles of Junín and Ayacucho, being awarded the rank of Divisional general by the Peruvian government.

Due to his explicit support of Bolivarianism during the controversy surrounding Bolívar's "Lifelong Constitution" and situation surrounding José Antonio Páez in Valencia, he became opposed by a large number of Republicans. He had continued fighting up until 1827, and in August 1828, when he was to leave for Venezuela, he was assassinated in his hacienda near Guayaquil.
