= Juan Germán Roscio =

Venezuelan lawyer and politician

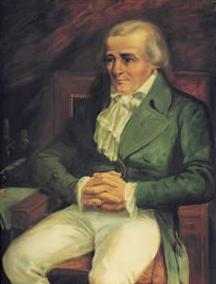

1st Minister of Foreign Affairs of Venezuela
- In office 25 April 1810 – 2 March 1811
- President: Cristóbal Mendoza
- Succeeded by: Pedro Gual

Vice President of Gran Colombia
- In office 21 March 1820 – 10 March 1821
- President: Simón Bolívar

Member of the Congress of Angostura

Personal details
- Born: 27 May 1763 San José de Tiznados, Province of Venezuela, Viceroyalty of New Granada, Spanish Empire
- Died: 10 March 1821 (aged 57) Cúcuta, Gran Colombia
- Profession: Lawyer, politician
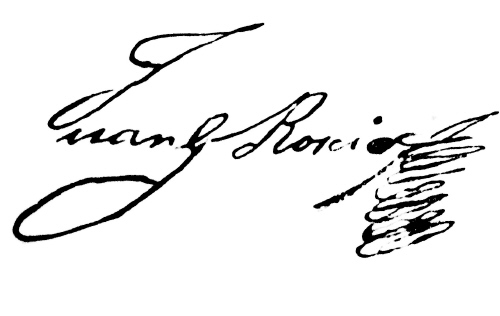
- Signature

Juan Germán Roscio (27 May 1763 – 10 March 1821) was a Venezuelan lawyer and politician of Italian background. He served as the secretary of foreign affairs for the Junta of Caracas, as Venezuela's first foreign minister, and as chief of the Executive during the First Republic of Venezuela. He was also editor for Gazeta de Caracas and ran the Correo del Orinoco. He was the main editor of the Venezuelan Declaration of Independence, the chief architect of the Venezuelan Constitution of 1811 and the electoral rules for the election of the first Congress. He was also president of the Angostura Congress in 1819 and vice president of Gran Colombia.

== Early years ==
Roscio was born to Italian migrants from Milan, Giovanni Roscio, and Paula María Nieves, a Venezuelan native from La Victoria. Living in San Francisco de Tiznados, he studied Italian and Latin. He moved to Caracas in 1774 in order to further his studies, undertaken under tutelage from the Count of San Javier's daughter. He studied theology and civil law, attaining degrees in Canon law and civil law in 1794 and 1800 respectively.

Filing for licensing at the Real Audiencia de Caracas in 1796, the College of Law alleged his unsuitability in light of irregularities in his maternal heritage claims, specifically his failure to state his "Indian" heredity. He appealed this determination in a nine-year-long process termed "trial of Inés María Paéz", after which he was admitted into the college. It is for this reason Roscio is considered an early defender of civil rights and anti-discrimination activist.

Roscio is known to have contracted marriage with Guyanese native María Dolores Cuevas, with whom he had a daughter, Carmen Roscio Cuevas, born 10 March 1821.

== Public life ==
Roscio was one of the Venezuelan Declaration of Independence's most important ideologues, taking a leading role in the 19 April 1810 revolution, as "representative of the people". He held the foreign ministry during the Supreme Junta, during which time he lobbied for emancipation, particularly during the Constitutional Congress of 1811. Attending the Congress as a representative for Calabozo, he took part in redacting the declaration of independence signed on 5 July 1811. He also helped redact the 1811 Federal Constitution, approved on 21 December 1811.

During August 1810 he founded the Sociedad Patriótica, later attended by Francisco de Miranda, and where Simón Bolívar was to give his notable "Acaso 300 años de calma no bastan" speech.

He was elected substitute member of the 1812 triumvirate that March. As part of his role, he supported ascribing Miranda the title of Generalisimo and Dictator of Venezuela. Following Domingo de Monteverde's triumph and the defeat of the First Republic, Roscio was sent to jail in the Arsenal de la Carraca in Spain. He was then transferred to Ceuta, along with seven co-prisoners, including José Cortés de Madariaga, Juan Pablo Ayala, Juan Paz del Castillo, Francisco Isnardi, Joseph Mires and Juan Baraona. He escaped to Gibraltar in 1814 with three of them, but was extradited to Spain by the British governor George Don. From Ceuta Roscio sent, through close friend Thomas Richard, a letter to King George IV, which played a part in Fernando VII's decision to release the four prisoners.

Roscio then travelled to Jamaica and then the United States, where he published Triunfo de la libertad sobre el despotismo (Philadelphia, 1817). He supported Simón Bolívar in 1818 at Angostura, throughout the creation of the Third Republic of Venezuela and the formulation of Gran Colombia. During this time he acted as finance minister and president of the Angostura Congress, as well as vice president of the Department of Venezuela and Gran Colombia. Roscio died on the eve of acting as president of the Cúcuta Congress, on 10 March 1821.

Roscio created paper money in Venezuela, proposing the name "Bolívar", which remains to this day. He was also a founding member of the Correo del Orinoco newspaper, its second director; and lobbied for the creation of a national library..

In 2011, his remains were decreed to be interred in the National Pantheon of Venezuela, a process which has been delayed due to difficulties in properly identifying his actual remains.
