= Constitution of Venezuela (1819) =

Former constitution of Venezuela

Political Constitution of the State of Venezuela
- Ratified: August 15, 1819
- Repealed: July 12, 1821
- Location: Ciudad Bolívar
- Author: Simón Bolívar
- Purpose: Political Constitution of the region of Venezuela in Gran Colombia

The Constitution of Venezuela (1819), also known as the Constitution of Angostura (and official name: Political Constitution of the State of Venezuela; Spanish: Constitución Política del Estado de Venezuela) was written by El Libertador of Venezuela, Simón Bolívar, and is the first constitution destined to the region of Venezuela within the Gran Colombia. It contains 12 Titles, a decree and an appendix related to moral power. It specified to the Venezuelans their rights, their duties, the sovereignty of the people, and the distribution of powers in the region as well as the division of society into Active Citizen (with the right to vote) and Passive Citizen (without the right to vote); however, both classes enjoyed the same rights.

== Rights and Duties of Venezuelans ==
=== Rights ===
- The right to expression and free thought, as well as the freedom to make them public using any means (taking responsibility for their words and applying penalties if it violates the "public tranquility, good customs, life, honor, esteem and individual property").
- It makes no direct reference to slavery, nor to its abolition, but expresses that "in no case can man be alienable property".
- Freedom to engage in industry.
- To freely dispose of and enjoy his property, the fruits of his labor, and no one may deprive him of them.
- The right to work for everyone who is "able to contract".
- Every house is inviolable asylum of every citizen (unless there is a case of flood, fire or other tragedy that arises, and needs the help of the inhabitant; likewise, when some legal procedure needs investigation, this, under the laws and all responsibility will fall on the authorities that so decree).
- Visits and constructions inside the property/home can only be made during daylight hours.
- No citizen should be deprived of liberty for claiming their rights, as long as it is individually, it is considered an attempt against public safety, if acts of protest are carried out with a single purpose, of a citizen inciting such protest; if it is a common purpose of several citizens, a written letter must be presented.
- Every citizen is innocent until proven guilty, cannot be tried, sentenced, or punished for crimes they have not committed, and without first being heard or legally summoned. Any lawful act, done by an authority towards any individual, outside the cases and forms of the law, is a crime, and the same must be punished, according to what is established by law.
- All harvest shall belong to the citizen who harvests it.

=== Duties ===
It stipulates that every citizen must comply with the laws and enforce them on other citizens.

== Citizens ==
Type	Privilege	Requirements
Active	All those stipulated in the constitution in its Title 1 and Title 4, in addition to the Right of Suffrage.	To be born in the territory of the Republic, and to have domicile or neighborhood in any district; Be married or older than twenty-one years of age; To know how to read and write; but this condition will not take place until the year 1830.; To possess a real estate property with a value of five hundred pesos in any part of Venezuela. The lack of this property will be made up for by having some degree, or public approval in a science, or liberal or mechanical art; or some employment with an income of three hundred pesos per year.
Passive	All those stipulated in the constitution in its Title 1, except the Right to Suffrage.	The opposite of the Active Citizen
Foreigner	All those stipulated in the constitution in its Title 1 and Title 4, in addition to the Right of Suffrage.	(not necessarily) Carta de naturaleza in reward of some important service done to the Republic (in reward of some important service done to the Republic, they will also be active citizens, if they are of the age of the natural born, and if they know how to read and write).; That being twenty-one years of age, they know how to read and write; That they have resided in the territory of the Republic for one continuous year, and are domiciled in some district; That they have manifested their intention to settle in the Republic, marrying a Venezuelan, or bringing their family to Venezuela; And that they possess a real estate property with a value of five hundred pesos, or that they exercise some science, liberal art, or mechanics.
Military (Venezuelan or foreigner)	All those stipulated in the constitution in its Title 1 and Title 4, in addition to the Right of Suffrage.	To have fought in the war of independence

=== Loses active citizenship rights ===
- Anyone who is absent from the territory of the Republic for four continuous years, not being on commission, or in the service of the Republic, or with a license from the Government;
- Whoever has suffered an afflictive or infamous penalty, until rehabilitation;
- Whoever has been convicted and condemned in a trial for having sold his suffrage, or bought that of another for himself or for a third party, whether in the primary assemblies, in the electoral assemblies, or in others.

=== The exercise of active citizenship is suspended ===
- In the insane, furious, or demented;
- In failed debtors and vagrants, declared as such;
- In those who have an open criminal case until they are declared acquitted, or sentenced to a penalty that is neither afflictive nor infamous;
- The debtors to public funds with a term served;
- And those who, being married, do not live with their wives without legal reason.

== Legislative Power ==
Preceded by the General Congress of Venezuela, composed of an equal number of Senators and Representatives:

The President of the Republic and the President of the House of Representatives, shall take the oath in the presence of the Senate in the hands of its president, and the latter shall in turn take the oath in the presence of the same Senate in the hands of the President of the Republic. The Senators and Representatives shall do so before their respective Presidents.

=== Senators ===
They are chosen during the first constituent process; Bishops may also be senators, in which case, honorary.

==== Requirements ====
- Active citizen
- Thirty years of age;
- Ten years of residence in the territory of the Republic, immediately prior to the election, unless his absence has been on commission, or in the service of it. Until the year 1825, it will suffice to have undertaken the campaign of 1816, and to have continued his services until the day of the election;
- A property of eight thousand pesos in real estate, or the income corresponding to this capital;

==== Functions ====
- To hear infractions of the Constitution as a result of an accusation proposed by the chamber;
- To qualify the qualities required in Articles 6 and 7 of this same section for senators;
- To exercise the natural power of a Court of Justice to admit accusations, hear, judge, and sentence: First. To the President of the Republic, to the members of Congress, and to the members of the Court of Justice in the cases expressed in the Constitution; Second. To any of the employees whenever they are accused by reason of their duties.
- To receive the elections of the electoral assemblies for President and Vice President of the Republic, and to summon the House of Representatives to verify the scrutiny of the votes, in accordance with Title 7.

=== The representatives ===
They are elected every four years, through an electoral period, every November, which begins with the Parish Assemblies every November 1, where the parish electors are elected (1 elector for every 500 inhabitants of the parish), then the Electoral Assemblies, every November 15, where the parish electors, previously elected, will vote and elect the parish representatives and their alternates (1 representative for every 20,000 inhabitants of the parish). Every 10 years, their elections are held by all the people, without the need for parish electors.

They have the power, every 10 years, to request a revision of a certain article or title of the constitution, to discuss and adjust said article.

==== Requirements ====
- Active citizen
- The age of twenty-five years old;
- Five years of residence in the territory of the Republic, immediately prior to the election. The condition of residence required here for Representatives does not exclude those who have been absent in the service of the State nor those who have remained outside of it with the permission of the Government on their own business, provided that their absence has not exceeded three years;
- And a property of five thousand pesos in real estate, or income of five hundred pesos annually, or the profession of a liberal science or art.

==== Functions and Duties ====
- The Chamber is responsible for overseeing public education and its progress.
- It has the right of inspection over all the employees of the Republic, and can accuse both the principal and the inferiors before the Senate, Any law on contributions, or taxes has its initiative exclusively in the House of Representatives.
- They cannot receive orders, nor particular instructions.
- It elects from among its members a President and a vice-president for the duration of its sessions, and appoints from among its members a Secretary and such officers as it deems necessary for the performance of its work, and assigns to these employees such salaries or gratuities as it deems necessary.

== Elections ==
=== Parish Assemblies ===
They are convened every 4 years, on November 1, by a Departmental Agent or by the citizens of the parish, it is composed of all the active citizen of the parish, the voting lasts 4 days and then the Assembly is dissolved. In this Assembly the following positions are elected:

Charge	Function	Term of office	Election	Requirements
Electors	Electing the senate representative	Until November 14, that is, on the day of the elections of Representatives	1 elector for every 500 citizens	To be an active citizen, to be older than twenty-one years of age, and to be a resident of one of the Parishes of the department where the elections are to be held; and to possess real property of the value of one thousand pesos, or to enjoy a job with an annual income of five hundred pesos, or to be the usufructuary of property that produces an annual income of five hundred pesos, or to profess a science, or to have a scientific degree.
Department Judge	Receive the facts transmitted by the Justice of the Peace, and take the corresponding measures in accordance with the Law.	4 years, November 1, that is, the day the new Parish Assembly is convened.	1	Active citizen and to be a lawyer of the republic.

=== Electoral Assemblies ===
These are convened every four years, on November 14, by the prefect in the capital of the department, where the following functions are carried out:

- To elect the President of the Republic
- Appoint the representative or representatives corresponding to the department, and an equal number of alternates to replace them in case of death, resignation, dismissal, serious illness, and necessary absence.
- To examine the record of the parish elections for municipal members: to scrutinize all the suffrages of the parishes; and to declare legitimate the appointment of the constitutional number of neighbors who have an absolute majority of votes. If none has reached it, the assembly will take a number triple the constitutional number among those who have more suffrages, and will choose from these the municipal members; but if only some are lacking, it will take only the triple number of those who are lacking, and their election will be reduced to these.
- To declare as Justice of the Peace of each Parish the citizen who has gathered the absolute majority of votes of his respective Parish, or to elect him among the three who have obtained the highest number of votes.
- To make the same declaration, or the same election, regarding the Departmental Judge.
- To draw up the list of jurors for each parish, and to enter therein the names of the twenty-four neighbors who have obtained a majority of the votes in their respective parishes.

The following officers are elected

Charge	Function	Term of office	Election	Requirements
President of the Republic	Head of the Executive Power	4 years	1 president, out of two candidates	Citizen of Venezuela by birth; To have resided in the territory of the Republic the last ten years, immediately preceding his election, unless the absence has been in commission, or service of the Republic. Until the year 1825 it will be enough to have undertaken the campaign of 1816, and to have continued his services absent or present, until the day of the election; And to possess a property of fifteen thousand pesos in real estate, to be an active citizen.
Parish and Jerados Justice of the Peace	Receive all civil and criminal lawsuits in which it is not possible to proceed ex officio. He must hear the plaintiffs and try to re-establish the order; if unsuccessful, the facts will be retransmitted to the Judge of the department.	4 years, November 1, that is, the day the new Parish Assembly is convened.	1	To be an active citizen; To obtain the highest number of votes in his parish.
Municipal Members	form the Municipality of the department and elect departmental agents.	4 years, November 1, that is, the day the new Parish Assembly is convened.	30,000 citizens=8 members; 60,000 citizens=12 members	To be an active citizen
Representatives	to be part of the General Congress of Venezuela and to make part of the House of Representatives.	4 years, November 1, that is, the day the new Parish Assembly is convened.	20,000=1; until the number of representatives reaches 60, after which no more representatives may be elected.	To be an active citizen, the minimum age of twenty-five years; Five years of residence in the territory of the Republic, immediately prior to the election. The condition of neighborliness required here for Representatives does not exclude those who have been absent in the service of the State nor those who have remained outside of it with permission of the Government on their own business, provided that their absence has not exceeded three years; And a property of five thousand pesos in real estate, or income of five hundred pesos annually, or the profession of a liberal science or art.

== Judicial Power ==
It is in the hands of the Supreme Court of Justice, composed of 5 ministers.

=== Election ===
The President submits his 15 nominations for the Court of Justice to the House of Representatives, which selects 10 ministers and submits them to the Senate, which selects the Supreme Court.

=== Requirements to become a judge ===
- Enjoy the rights of an Active Citizen.
- To be a lawyer not in suspense.
- Be at least thirty years of age.

=== Functions ===
- In all so-called court cases;
- In those concerning ambassadors, ministers, consuls, or diplomatic agents with the notice of the President of the Republic;
- In competencies that have arisen, or that may arise between superior courts;
- In controversies resulting from treaties and negotiations made by the Executive Power;
- In the differences or lawsuits that may arise between one or many provinces, or between an individual and one or more provinces.
- Examination, and approval of the lawyers of the Republic, to issue them their degrees, and to present them to the Executive Power so that it allows them to exercise their functions.

== Executive Power ==
In the hands of the president, elected every 4 years, together with a ministerial train, six ministries, namely: Foreign Affairs, Interior, Justice, Finance, Navy, and War. Their functions are:

- He is the commander in chief of the armed forces.
- He may not be absent from the territory of the Republic, neither during nor one year after his functions, without the permission of the Senate.
- He may only be removed from office by the Senate.
- In case of death, the president and vice-president of the Senate take power until a new election is held.
- Requires compliance with the constitution.
- According to the law, if disturbances occur, the constitutional guarantees can be suspended in that province.

== Regional power ==
Each Province will be divided into Departments and Parishes, whose limits and demarcations will also be fixed by the Congress; observing in the meantime those known at the time of the Federal Constitution. A more natural division of the territory into Departments, Districts, and Parishes will be made within ten years, when the Constitution is revised.

=== Parish ===
- Justice of the Peace: Instance that performs the following functions:
  - before whom all civil lawsuits will be proposed, and criminal lawsuits in which it is not possible to proceed ex officio.
  - If it is impossible to resolve a case peacefully, it will be forwarded to the Superior Court of the Province.

Representative	Institution	Location	Level within National Hierarchy
Justice of the Peace	Parish Tribunal	Parish	Low

=== Provinces ===
- Governor: his term of office is 3 years, elected by the House of Representatives with a single reelection. The Governor is the Prefect of the Department of the Capital of the Province and is the immediate subordinate of the President of the Republic. His functions are:
  - To exercise the high police in all of it and to preside over the Municipalities;
  - To oversee compliance with the laws;
  - To propose to the President the Departmental Prefects;
  - To be the intendant of the revenues of the Province.
- Superior Court: composed of 3 members, their functions are as follows:
  - To hear cases appealed from the lower courts of the Province, and the competences promoted among them.

Representative	Institution	Location	Level within National Hierarchy
Governor of the Province	Prefecture of the Department of the Capital of the Province	Capital of the Province	Superior
3 Attorneys	Superior Court	Capital of the Province	Medium

=== Departments ===
In each departmental capital there is a Prefect, and a Municipality; their functions are:

- The Prefect: with the possibility of only one reelection, then he/she must wait 1 year to be reelected.
  - Is Lieutenant to the Governor of the Province, in all his attributions, that is to say, he has inferior attributions to the Governor of the Province.
  - Confirms the Departmental Agents, their term of office is one year.
- The Municipality:
  - Appoints the Departmental Agents;
  - Is especially in charge of the fulfillment of the Constitution in its department;
  - Proposes to the Governor of the Province through the Prefect or by Diputaciones the reforms and improvements that can be made in the administration of his department so that he can pass them on to the President of the Republic;
  - Forms and keeps a record of the census of the population of the department by parishes with the state, domicile, age, wealth, and profession of each resident;
  - Forms and keeps a registry of all the children born in the department according to the records that have been registered in each Parish by the agent with expression of the day of their birth, the name of their parents and godparents, and their condition, that is to say, if they are legitimate or natural;
  - Forms and keeps another registry of those who die in the department with expression of their age, state and neighborhood.
  - At each new Congress, he forwards copies of all these records to the Senate so that the number of Representatives can be increased, or reformed, and the elections can be qualified.
  - The Municipality elects from among its members the Departmental Agent who is to preside over the Parish Assembly.
- Departmental Agent: Proposed by the Municipality and approved by the Prefect of the department, his functions are:
  - Is the lieutenant of the prefect in all his attributions, that is to say, he has inferior attributions to the Governor of the Province.
  - Sends to the Municipality of the Capital of the department the records of the elections to file them, and informs the electors of their appointments, indicating to them the day on which they must be in the same capital.
  - Presides over the Parish Assembly
- Judge of the Department Lawyer of the Republic, elected by the Electoral Assembly every 4 years, is responsible for the following functions:
  - to travel through the department four times a year
  - To pronounce sentences in civil cases that the Justices of the Peace of the Parishes of their Departments substantiate, and in those that in criminal cases are promoted ex officio before their Commissioners.
  - Its first attention is to watch over the correct Administration of Justice.

Representative	Institution	Location	Level within National Hierarchy
Prefect	Department Prefecture	Department Capital	Medium
Municipal Members	Municipality	Department Capital	Medium
Departmental Agent	Departmental Prefecture; Parish Assembly	Department Capital; Parish	Low
Department Judge	Department Prefecture	Department Capital	Medium

== See also ==
- Colombian Constitution of 1821
- Third Republic of Venezuela

Preceded by Federal Constitution of the States of Venezuela of 1811	Political Constitution of the State of Venezuela; 1819–1821	Succeeded by Colombian Constitution of 1821
