= José Cortés =

José Cortés may refer to:

- José Cortés de Madariaga (1766–1826), Chilean patriot
- Juan Donoso Cortés (1809–1853), Spanish counter-revolutionary, author, and theologian
- José Cortés (footballer) (born 1994), Colombian footballer
