= Colombian Constitution of 1821 =

Former constitution of Gran Colombia

Constitution of the Republic of Colombia
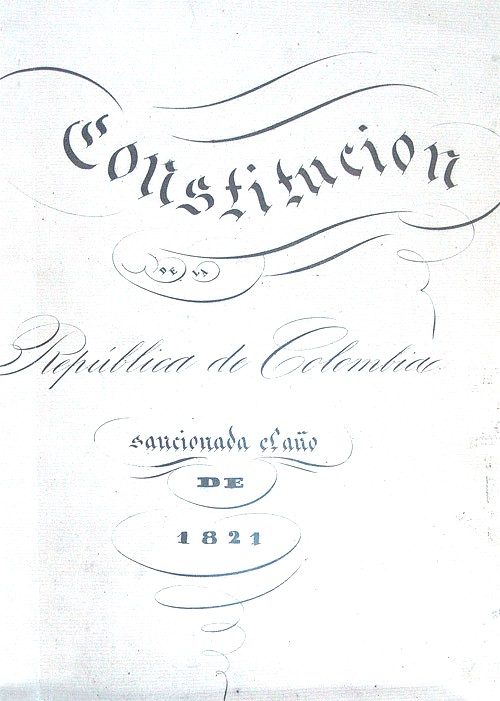

Overview
- Jurisdiction: Republic of Colombia
- Presented: July 2, 1821
- Ratified: August 30, 1821
- Date effective: October 6, 1821
- System: Centralized presidential representative republic

Government structure
- Branches: Three (legislative, executive, judicial)
- Head of state: President of the Republic
- Chambers: Senate and Chamber of Representatives
- Executive: President of the Republic
- Judiciary: High Court of Justice
- Federalism: Unitary (centralized)
- Electoral college: Provincial electoral assemblies
- Entrenchments: 6 articles (Articles 1–3 and 9–11)
- First legislature: 1823
- First executive: October 3, 1821
- First court: October 1821
- Repealed: August 27, 1828
- Authors: Vicente Azuero, José Manuel Restrepo, Diego Fernando Gómez, José Cornelio Valencia and Luis Ignacio Mendoza, for the Constitution and Legislation Commission
- Signatories: 61 deputies of the Congress of Cúcuta, 95 total. (37 representing New Granada; 24 representing Venezuela)
- Media type: Constitution
- Supersedes: Fundamental Law of the Union of the Peoples of Colombia (1821)
- Superseded by: Organic Decree of August 27, 1828
- Cúcuta Constitution at Spanish Wikisource

Leadership
- President: Simón Bolívar
- Vice President: Francisco de Paula Santander
- President of Congress: Miguel Peña
- Vice President of Congress: Rafael Lasso de la Vega

The Colombian Constitution of 1821, also known as Constitution of Cúcuta, or Constitution of Gran Colombia, was the founding document and constitution of the Republic of Colombia. It was adpoted by the Congress of Cúcuta, whose deputies represented the peoples of New Granada and Venezuela, following the ratification of their political union under the Fundamental Law of the Union of the Peoples of Colombia in July 1821. The constitution established Colombia as a centralized representative republic, which governmental power divided in legislative, executive and judicial power. It was adopted and signed at the Villa del Rosario de Cúcuta on 30 of August of 1821, it was sanctioned by president Simón Bolívar on October 1821.

== History ==
The antecedents are the Congress of Angostura in 1819 and the assembly of notables in Bogotá made by Santander in 1820. After the delays in assembling the required deputies, the general congress was formally installed by Antonio Nariño at the villa del Rosario on 6 of may 1821, with 57 deputies representing 19 provinces of New Granada and Venezuela, later 71 congress participants; 44 representing new granadan provinces and 27 representing venezuelan provinces. The congress of Cúcuta was therefore already in session before the Battle of Carabobo of 24 june 1821.

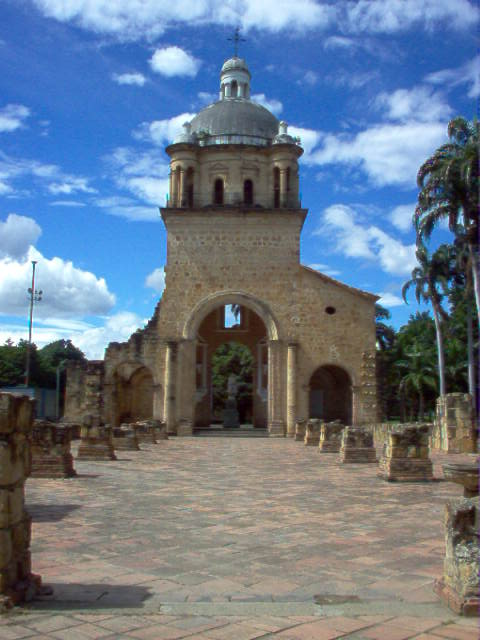
Historic church of Cúcuta, where the deputies of New Granada (Colombia) and Venezuela signed the Constitution

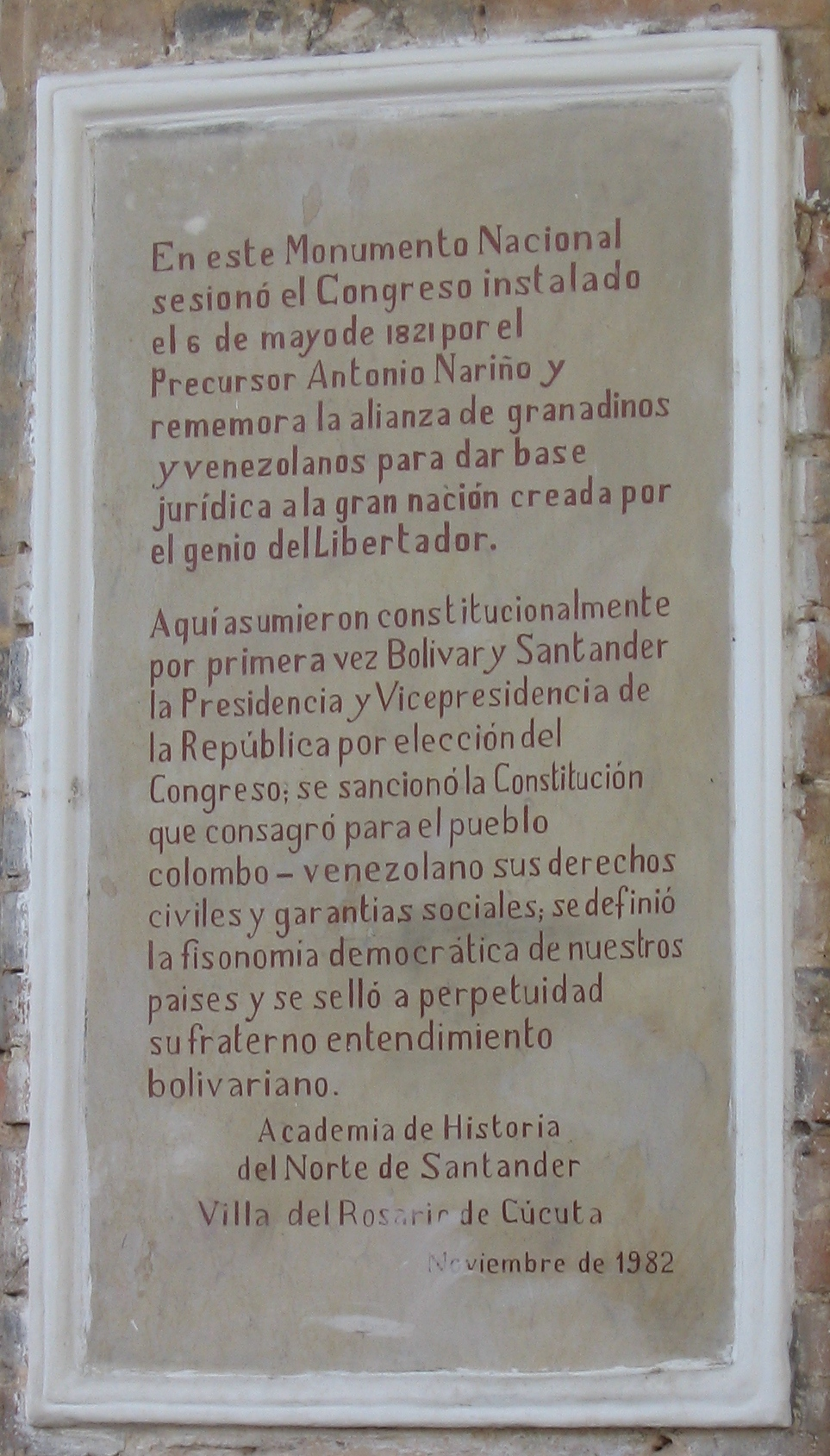
Commemoration of the Constitution of Cúcuta

On 12 of July 1821, the representatives of the peoples of New Granada and Venezuela, assembled in General Congress and adopted the Fundamental Law of the Union of the Peoples of Colombia. The law stated that the New Granadan assembly and new Colombian congress had examined the fundamental law adopted by the Congress of Venezuela at Angostura in 1819 and declared the provinces of New Granada and Venezuela united in single nation under the title of the Republic of Colombia (Gran Colombia).

The new elected congress subsequently completed the new constitution, which was approved at Cúcuta on 30 of August 1821. The Constitution established the political institutions of the republic under a centralized, representative system of government and consisted of 10 titles and 191 articles. It was sanctioned by President Simón Bolívar on 6 of October of 1821.

== See also ==
- Gran Colombia

== Bibliography ==
- Bushnell, David (1970). The Santander Regime in Gran Colombia. Westport: Greenwood Press. ISBN 0-8371-2981-8
- Gibson, William Marion (1948). The Constitutions of Colombia. Durham: Duke University Press.

Preceded by Constitution of Antioquia Constitution of Cartagena Constitution of Cundinamarca Constitution of Neiva Constitution of Mariquita	Constitutional history of Colombia, Constitution of Gran Colombia; 1821–1830	Succeeded by Constitution of the Republic of Colombia of 1830; Constitution of New Granada of 1832
Preceded by Quiteña Constitution of 1812	Constitutional history of Ecuador, Constitution of Gran Colombia; 1821–1830	Succeeded by Constitution of Ecuador of 1830
Preceded by Constitution of Venezuela of 1819	Constitutional history of Venezuela, Constitution of Gran Colombia; 1821–1830	Succeeded by Constitution of Venezuela of 1830
