= José Cortés de Madariaga =

South American patriot

- Born: 8 July 1766 near Santiago, Captaincy General of Chile, Spanish Empire
- Died: March 1826 (aged 59); Riohacha, Gran Colombia

José Cortés de Madariaga (8 July 1766 – March 1826) was a South American patriot.

== Biography ==
Cortés de Madariaga studied theology in Santiago de Chile and was ordained in 1788. He continued his studies at the Universidad de San Felipe and graduated as doctor of divinity. He got into a contest with someone else over a professorship of decretals at the university, and the two sailed to Spain to get a judgment in Madrid. Both were rejected. On his return to Chile in 1802, a contrary wind landed him in La Guaira, from where he travelled to Caracas, where he obtained a canonry in the cathedral in 1803.

He took part in the patriotic movement, and when on 19 April 1810, in the meeting of the municipality, the captain general, Vicente Emparan, was about to be victorious, Cortés de Madariaga was sent for and took a seat in the assembly as deputy of the clergy. By his speeches, he influenced the assembly, and the populace outside, to demand the deposition of Emparan, thus declaring independence.

He was sent in 1811 as a commissioner to the patriots of New Granada, but in 1812 was included in the capitulation of Miranda, and sent by Monteverde as a prisoner to Spain, where he was confined in the penitentiary of Ceuta. He fled to Gibraltar in February 1814, and was delivered up by the acting governor, Sir George Don, to the Spanish authorities, but released in the following year on the reclamation of the British cabinet, which disavowed the conduct of the governor.

In 1816, he set out for Jamaica, where he heard of Bolívar's expedition from Haiti to Venezuela, and early in 1817 sailed for Isla Margarita. There, he published a manifesto protesting against the country being controlled by military chiefs, and recommending the formation of a representative government. In April he went to Carúpano, and in Cariaco met Montilla, Zea, and others, who were carried away by Cortés de Madariaga's eloquence, and on 8 May assembled the so-called Congress of Cariaco, which decreed the deposition of Bolivar from the executive and appointed a governing junta of three members. But the other chiefs of the eastern provinces did not recognize the authority of this congress or the governing junta, and before the approach of the enemy, Cortés de Madariaga fled to Jamaica.

In 1820, Cortés de Madariaga joined the expedition of General Montilla against Riohacha and Santa Marta, and fixed his residence there, while Caracas, which had become his second home, was occupied by the Spaniards. When they evacuated Caracas in June 1821, Cortés de Madariaga, offended at not being summoned, remained in Riohacha until his death.
