= Constitution of Venezuela (1811) =

First constitution of Venezuela

Federal Constitution of the States of Venezuela
- Ratified: December 21, 1811
- Repealed: July 21, 1812
- Location: Caracas Federal Palace
- Author: Deputies of the First National Congress of Venezuela
- Signatories: 38 Deputies
- Purpose: To confederate the then provinces of Venezuela, establishing a State independent from Spain, under a popular, republican and federal government, consecrating the First Republic of Venezuela.

The Constitution of Venezuela of 1811 (Official name: Federal Constitution of the States of Venezuela; Spanish: Constitución Federal de los Estados de Venezuela) was the first Constitution of Venezuela and Ibero-America, promulgated and written by Cristóbal Mendoza and Juan Germán Roscio, being sanctioned by the Constituent Congress of 1811 in the city of Caracas on December 21, 1811. It was overthrown on July 21, 1812 by the capitulation of Francisco de Miranda in San Mateo. The constitution was in force for exactly seven months.

This Federalist Constitution was approved by the representatives of the Provinces of Margarita, Mérida, Cumaná, Barinas, Barcelona, Trujillo, and Caracas, who declared their independence from the Spanish Empire during the constituent Congress and agreed to implement the name "States of Venezuela" as the official name. It recognized the faith of the Catholic Church as the official religion of the Venezuelan State. The election was indirect or second-degree: Only men who owned property could elect one representative for every 20,000 inhabitants who in turn would elect the representatives of the Chamber of Deputies and Senators in addition to the three persons in charge of the Executive Power (triumvirate).

Once signed, 228 of its articles were approved, being noteworthy the reservations generated by article 180 for the then Vice President Francisco de Miranda and the rest of the executive train. The article stated:

"There will be no personal jurisdiction: only the nature of the matters will determine the Magistrates to whom their knowledge belongs; and the employees of any branch, in the cases that occur on matters that were not proper to their profession and career, will be subject to the judgment of the Magistrates and ordinary Courts, like other citizens."

== Provincial Constitutions ==
According to the Federalist system established in the Constitution, each region had the power to administer and govern itself autonomously as long as it did not contradict the principles of the nation. Once the election of provincial deputies to the Congress of the Provinces of Venezuela had taken place, the Provincial Legislatures were urged to dictate their own Constitutions. However, not all provinces had the opportunity to draft one before the fall of the First Republic.

=== Constitution of the Province of Caracas ===
- Enacted in 1812.
- Originally it was to be promulgated prior to the Federal Constitution so that it could serve as inspiration for the elaboration of the Magna Carta.
- It is the most extensive Provincial Constitution of them all.
- It established a territorial division for the Province.
- The territory of the Province of Caracas was divided into Departments, these into Cantons and these into Districts.
- The 5 Departments of the Province were: Caracas, San Sebastián, Los Valles de Aragua, Barquisimeto and San Carlos.
- Cantons: Canton del Tuy, Canton de los Altos and the Canton of Caracas.
- Each Department consisted of one or more Cantons according to the proportion of localities.
- Each Canton comprised three Districts, and sometimes one more depending on the circumstances.
- Each District was composed of a portion of territory with ten thousand inhabitants.

=== Constitution of the Province of Mérida ===
On July 31, 1811, a constitutional text of 148 articles was promulgated.

=== Constitution of the Province of Trujillo ===
On September 5, 1811, a constitutional text of 63 articles was promulgated.

== Federalism in the Constitution of 1811 ==
In the Constitution of 1811, in addition to the influences of the political liberalism of the French Revolution, it received the direct influence of the American Constitution in the configuration of the state as a federal state, fostered such reception by the situation of local autonomy that the cabildos and town councils of the provinces that later formed Venezuela had. Indeed, when the American countries declared their independence from Spain at the beginning of the 19th century, it can be said that the administrative system of the nascent republics of the new world was completely decentralized. The provinces that formed the Captaincy General of Venezuela had local power, and the clearest example of this was the declaration of independence on April 19, 1810, by the Cabildo de Caracas and the invitation to the other cabildos or town councils of Spanish America for the formation of that great American confederation dreamed of by the local notables. On the other hand, there were seven provinces of the Captaincy General of Venezuela that constituted the federal republic of 1811, and it was the local-federal power that this text consecrated, which marked the beginning of a decentralized system of government in Venezuela, in which, despite the proposals of El Libertador, the power remained in the provinces-cities, the central government being an entelechy. To this weakness of the main power, El Libertador himself attributed the fall of the first republic in 1812.

== See also ==
- Venezuelan independence

Preceded by Laws of the Indies; Captaincy General of Venezuela	Federal Constitution of the States of Venezuela; 1811–1812	Succeeded by Political Constitution of the State of Venezuela of 1819
