= Third Republic of Venezuela =

Period of Venezuelan statehood from 1817 to 1819

Coordinates: 10.0833°N 67.5333°W

Republic of Venezuela República de Venezuela (Spanish)
- 1817–1819
- Flag Coat of arms
- Motto: Nuestra virtud
- Republic of Venezuela Red - royalist territory
- Status: Unrecognized state
- Capital: Caracas (occupied); Angostura (de facto)
- Common languages: Spanish
- Government: Republic
  - Supreme Commander: Simón Bolívar
- Historical era: Spanish American wars of independence
  - Guyana Campaign: 19 July 1817
  - Congress of Angostura: 1819
- ISO 3166 code: VE
Preceded by	Succeeded by
Captaincy General of Venezuela; Second Republic of Venezuela	Gran Colombia

The Third Republic of Venezuela (Spanish: Tercera República de Venezuela) was the reestablished Republic of Venezuela declared by Simón Bolívar in the year 1817, during the Venezuelan War of Independence.

== History ==
The beginning of the Third Republic of Venezuela is attributed to the period after the Guayana campaign, during which the Republicans restored democratic institutions in Angostura. Appointments to the Council of State were done by its Supreme Commander, Simón Bolívar, who made Francisco Antonio Zea councillor of state and finance, Luis Brión councillor of the navy and military, and Juan Martínez Alemán councillor of interior and justice. The Republic ended after the Congress of Angostura of 1819 decreed the union of Venezuela with New Granada, to form the Republic of Gran Colombia.

Venezuela would become once again an independent Republic after its separation from Gran Colombia in 1830, with José Antonio Páez as President.

== Administrative divisions ==
1. Mérida Province
2. Trujillo Province
3. Caracas Province
4. Barinas Province
5. Barcelona Province
6. Cumaná Province
7. Margarita Province
8. Guayana Province

== See also ==
- Captaincy General of Venezuela
- Venezuelan War of Independence
- First Republic of Venezuela
- Second Republic of Venezuela
- Gran Colombia
