= Francisco Antonio Zea =

Colombian journalist, botanist, diplomat, and politician (1766–1822)

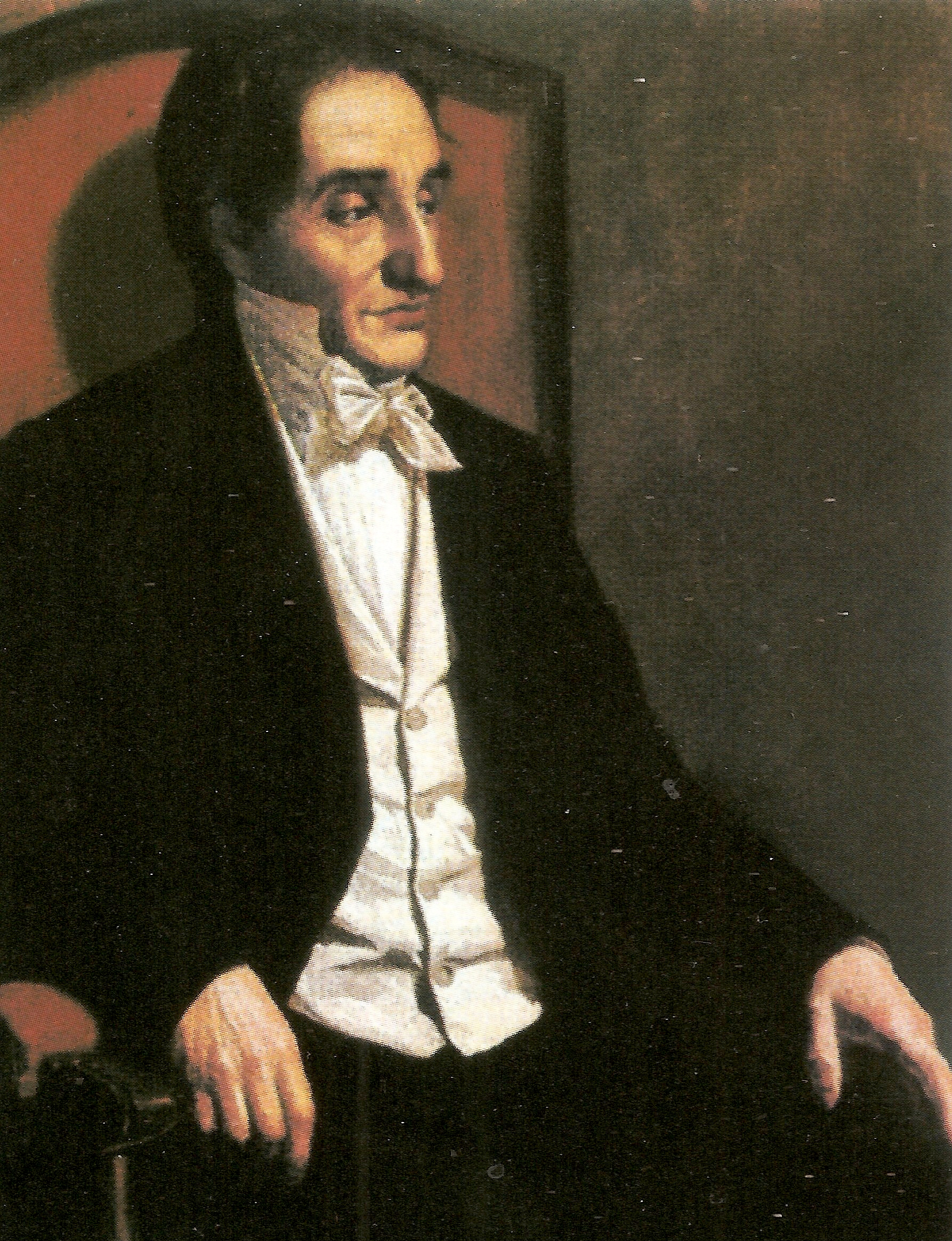
- Portrait by Pedro Lovera, c. 1874

Colombian Ambassador to the United Kingdom
- In office 16 June 1820 – 28 November 1822
- President: Simón Bolívar
- Preceded by: Office created
- Succeeded by: José Fernández Madrid

Vice President of Colombia
- In office 17 December 1819 – 21 March 1820
- President: Simón Bolívar Palacios
- Preceded by: Office created
- Succeeded by: Francisco de Paula Santander y Omaña

President of the Congress of Angostura
- In office 15 February 1819 – 7 September 1819
- Deputy: Diego de Vallenilla

Vice President of Venezuela
- In office 15 February 1819 – 17 December 1819

Personal details
- Born: Juan Francisco Antonio Hilarión Zea Díaz; 23 November 1766 Medellín, Antioquia, Viceroyalty of New Granada, Spanish Empire
- Died: 28 November 1822 (aged 56) Bath, Somerset, England, United Kingdom
- Resting place: Bath Abbey; 51°22′51″N 2°21′33″W
- Spouse: Felipa Meilhon Montemayor
- Children: Felipa Zea Meilhon, Viscountess of Rigny
- Occupation: Diplomat, botanist

Juan Francisco Antonio Hilarión Zea Díaz (23 November 1766 – 28 November 1822) was a Neogranadine journalist, botanist, diplomat, politician, and statesman who served as Vice President of Gran Colombia under then President Simón Bolívar. He was also Ambassador of Gran Colombia to the United Kingdom where he tried in vain to gain recognition for the nascent nation of Gran Colombia.

== Family ==
Francisco Antonio Zea was born in Medellín on 2 November 1766, the son of Don Pedro Rodríguez de Zea Casafus, and María Rosalia Ignacia Díaz Peláez, both of whose paternal family hailed from Spain while their respective maternal sides were from well established Criollo Paisa families. He was baptised on 23 November 1766, in the Basílica de Nuestra Señora de la Candelaria, with the name Juan Francisco Antonio Hilarión Zea Díaz.

Zea married in Madrid in 1805 to Felipa Meilhon y Montemayor, a gaditana born in 1788, daughter of Juan Antonio Meilhon, a native of Béarn, France, and Antonia Montemayor, native of Ronda, Málaga. Out of this marriage only one daughter was born, Felipa Antonia Zea Meilhon, who would later become Viscountess of Rigny after marrying Alexander Gaulthier, Viscount of Rigny, son of Henri, Count of Rigny. Zea's widow died in Madrid in 1833, and his daughter then-widow of Rigny, died on 4 September 1887 at the Château de Fougères.

== Early career ==
Zea began his education in Medellín. Afterwards he travelled to the Real Colegio y Seminario de Popayán, where his distant relative José Félix de Restrepo was a professor. In the Seminary he became acquainted with other young Neogranadines who would go on to become precursors and martyrs of the independence such as Francisco José de Caldas, Camilo Torres Tenorio, Francisco Antonio Ulloa, and José María Cabal.

He finished his studies in 1785, and although his father wanted him to continue his ecclesiastical studies, Zea moved the next year to Bogotá in hopes of studying jurisprudence, goal which he attained by applying and receiving a scholarship from the Colegio Mayor de San Bartolomé.

He had to endure poverty and sickness, to the point that he was expelled for not being able to pay his pension. He was able to continue his studies with the help of Gabriel Muñoz, and in 1788 he became an adjunct professor of grammar and in 1789 adjunct professor of philosophy, positions which allowed him to improve his living situation. Maybe it was his love of teaching, or his need and desire for a stable income, but he decided to postpone his degree to teach full-time, degree which he never did achieve. He became renowned as a tutor to the extent that Viceroy José Manuel de Ezpeleta hired him as a private tutor for his children.

=== Botanist ===
While in the Real Colegio y Seminario de Popayán, he wrote his treatise "Hebephilo," for the Papel Periodico inviting young men to the study of nature. Following his move to Santafé (modern-day Bogotá) to study jurisprudence, Zea made a name for himself among the intellectual circles of the city. This led to the recommendation of José Celestino Mutis for his appointment as an aggregate to the Royal Botanical Expedition to New Granada, following Mutis' retirement in 1789. Zea decided to abandon his career as a lawyer and devote to research and science following this appointment.

Following his exile from New Granada, and the subsequent time he spent in a scientific mission in France, he was appointed director of the Royal Botanical Garden of Madrid upon his return to Spain in 1803.

=== Spanish exile ===
Zea was a common discussant on political matters along with other heroes of Colombian independence, many of whom like him had attended school in the Seminary in Popayán and later moved on to Santafé, like Camilo Torres, and Francisco José de Caldas. During this time he became a close friend of Antonio Nariño. While Zea spent his time in Fusagasugá devoted to his botanical studies in 1794, he was arrested along with Antonio Nariño, and many others, as he was implicated in the circulation of the"Droits de l'homme, and was sent with them to Spain, where he spent two years as a prisoner, first in the Castle of San Sebastián of Cádiz, and then in the city itself, and later on to Seville.

Zea and his fellow prisoners were absolved in 1799, but he had to remain in Spain as he found himself impoverished. Zea appealed the conditions and reasons of his arrest, and managed to obtain royal authorization for his reinstatement to the Botanical Expedition and the payment of his missed salaries while in prison. While waiting for the reimbursement, Zea also managed to befriend the Minister of Finance in Spain, from whom he managed to obtain a commission to move to Paris on a scientific mission to update his knowledge and acquiring scientific equipment. Arguably, the government also desired to keep him away from New Granada. He spent about two years in Paris, devoted mostly to the study of chemistry. He also occasionally attended political meetings organized by Francisco de Miranda.

On his return to Spain, in 1803, he was elected member of several Spanish scientific societies, and was appointed editor of the Mercurio de España and Semanario de Agricultura. He was also appointed director of the Royal Botanical Garden of Madrid, a very prestigious scientific position for an American, particularly for one who had been in jail a few years earlier. He accepted the position with the goal of writing the results of Mutis' Botanical Expedition, which he believed would improve the conditions and development of his native New Granada as well as improve the use of crops and animals from the Americas, which he believed would increase trade. While he was director of the Botanical Garden he made continuous requests to be allowed to be relieved from his appointment and return to his homeland, but all of these requests went unanswered without explanation.

== Exile in France and Independence Campaign ==
In 1808 during the Peninsular War, Napoleonic France took over Spain. Zea took the invasion as an opportunity to leave his position as director of the Botanical Garden, and declared himself an afrancesado right away. Zea's insubordination to Spain, his allegiance to France and his love of French culture and French language which he spoke fluently made him one of the few Neogranadine afrancesados of his time. Murat offered Zea and Ignacio Tejada to become representatives of the Americans. As such, Zea was one of the 85 deputies from Spain convened by order of Napoleon I of France at Bayonne, to select a new king of Spain. The new king selected was Joseph Bonaparte, Napoleon's elder brother, under whose authority Zea entered Spain and who shortly afterwards named him prefect at Málaga. Zea's time as prefect did not last long however, as with the defeat of the French in 1814, Zea had to escape from Spain, moving first to London and then returning to seek refuge in France.

During this period, Zea became very active in communicating with the American colonies and tried to support their independence efforts. He went to Santo Domingo in 1815 to meet Bolívar, and the two became close friends. Zea then would move to Haiti to support the independence campaign as Bolívar had found sanctuary there by the government of Alexandre Pétion. In February, 1816, Bolívar appointed him Manager of Finance of the Confederate States of New Granada and Venezuela. Pétion offered Zea to become the Minister of Agriculture of Haiti, but Zea preferred to travel to Venezuela to help with Bolívar's independence campaign. Zea became one of Bolívar's closest advisors, and accompanied him to the conquest of Angostura in July, 1817. Once installed in Angostura, Zea created what would become the official newspaper of the new government called Correo del Orinoco (Orinoco's Mail).

Zea had little role in the military efforts, but his vast knowledge, political skill, oratory skills and even his masonic link to Bolívar allowed him to become Bolívar's close advisor, and to be appointed to a number of positions in the political course of the new government. He was appointed Manager (February, 1816), Member of the Provisional Junta of government (May, 1817), President of the Court for the seizure of the goods of the supporters of the king (September, 1817), President of State and Finance (November, 1817), Deputy to the Congress (February, 1819), President of Congress (February, 1819), and following the liberation of New Granada, as Vice-President of the Republic (December, 1819), and finally, Plenipotentiary Minister in the Exterior (December, 1819).

== Founding of Colombia ==
=== President of Congress ===
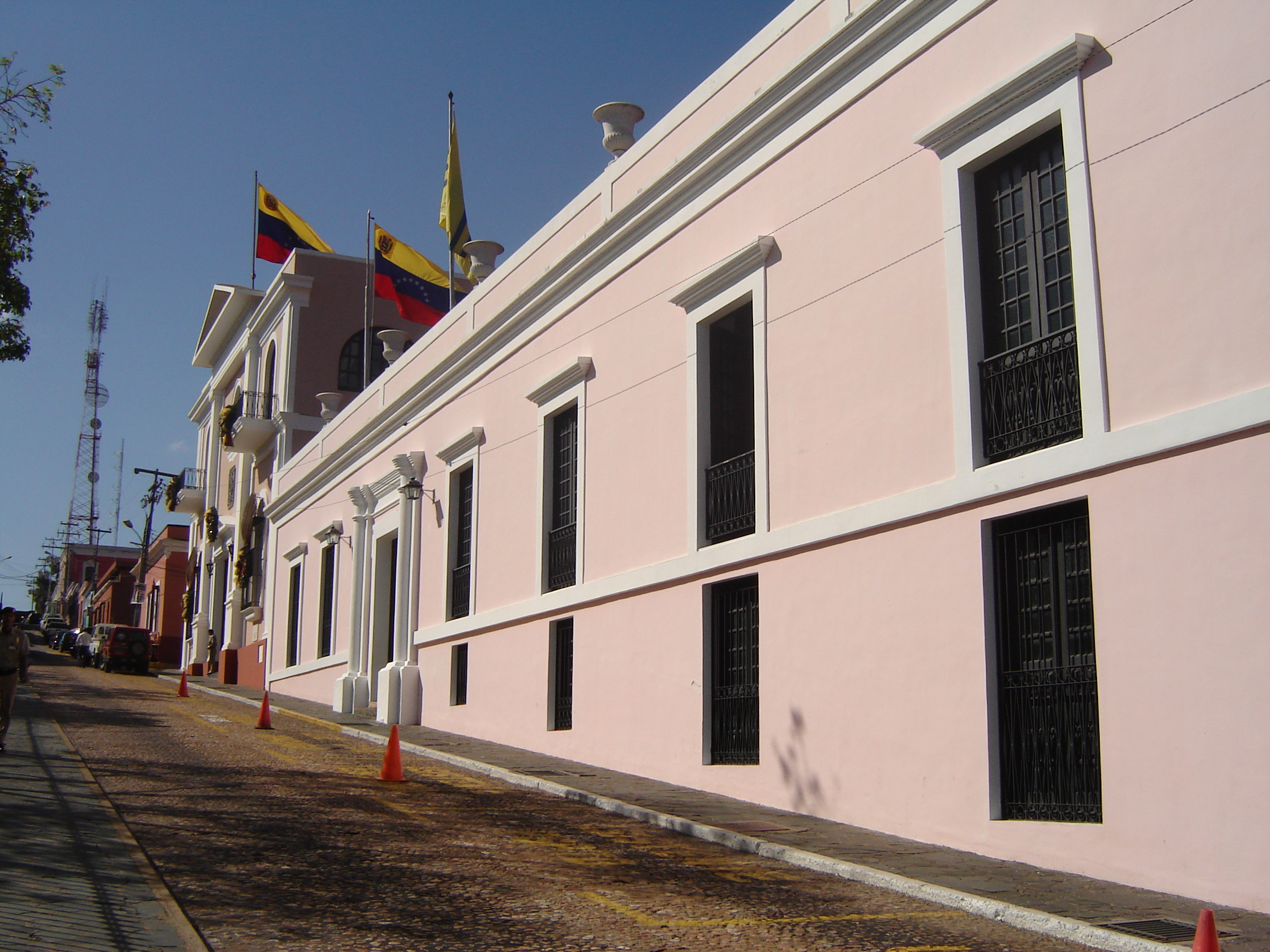
House of the Congress of Angostura

In 1819 Zea took part in what would be known as the Congress of Angostura, a legislative body gathered by Simon Bolivar in the city of Angostura in Venezuela, where delegates from Venezuela provinces and the Casanare province of New Granada planned to charter the course for the new liberated nation of the Gran Colombia. When the congress first convened on 15 February 1819, Zea, as delegate for Caracas was elected President of the Congress of Venezuela and Diego de Vallenilla Arana its Deputy Secretary. This meant that while congress deliberated on the future political composition of the nation and elected its leaders, Zea was both the chief executive officer and the chief legislative officer.

The signs of internal division began showing soon after as Venezuelans did not want to be ruled by a Neogranadine for they thought of themselves as independent of the new nation, in the end it proved too much as Zea was confronted with a lot of opposition from the Venezuelan armed forces who did not want to be commanded by a civilian, let alone a Neogranadine forcing Zea to step down on 7 September 1819, however he remained a member of congress.

=== Vice president of Venezuela and Colombia ===
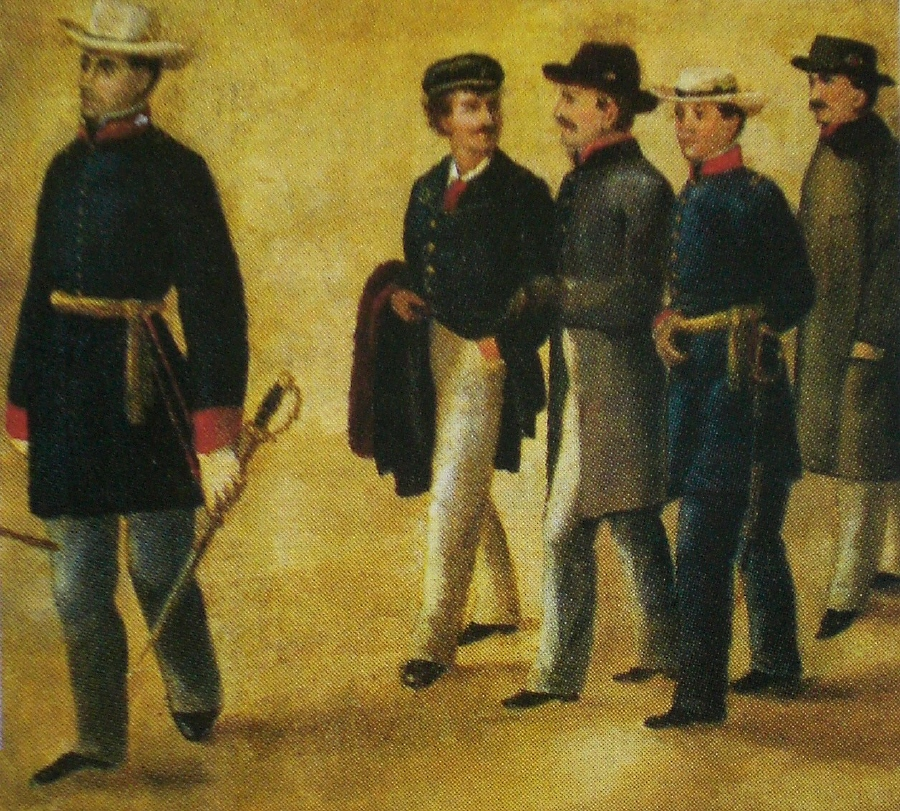
Carlos Soublette, Pedro Briceño Méndez, Francisco Antonio Zea, Gregor MacGregor and Luis Brión in Ocumare. 19th century illustration by Carmelo Fernández.

On February 15 1819 Zea was elected president of the congress of Angostura, additionally, he was appointed vice president of Venezuela following Bolívar's election as interim president of Venezuela.On 17 December 1819, the Congress of Angostura passed the Constitution of 1819 which officially created the First Republic of Colombia, a country made of 3 departments: Venezuela, Cundinamarca, and Quito. Congress also elected Simón Bolívar the First President of Colombia, and Zea as the First Vice President of Colombia, it also elected individual Vice presidents for the departments, Juan Germán Roscio as Vice President of Venezuela, and Francisco de Paula Santander as Vice President of Cundinamarca, the office of Vice President of Quito was left vacant as the Royal Audience of Quito was still under Spanish rule.

=== Potential Hispanic Confederacy ===
At the beginning of the Spanish Trienio Liberal (1820-1823), Zea met with the Spanish ambassador in London, Bernardino Fernández de Velasco, about a proposed Plan de reconciliación y proyecto de Confederación Hispánica ("Plan of reconciliation and project of a Hispanic Confederacy"), which would unite Spain and all the new nations born of Spanish overseas territories in a global empire composed by republics with Madrid as its capital. The confedaracy would entail a mutual defense agreement, a single market protected against foreign states and a federal diet. He urged Spain to accept while the breakup was still mendable and offered himself as a hostage to secure its process. On October 9, the project was sent to both King Ferdinand VII and secretary of the government Evaristo Pérez de Castro, but both rejected it. Ferdinand was opposed to anything but a restauration of the old absolute throne, while the liberal government believed their new policies would result into a global Hispanic conciliation in any case. Both were ultimately unsuccessful.

=== Diplomat ===
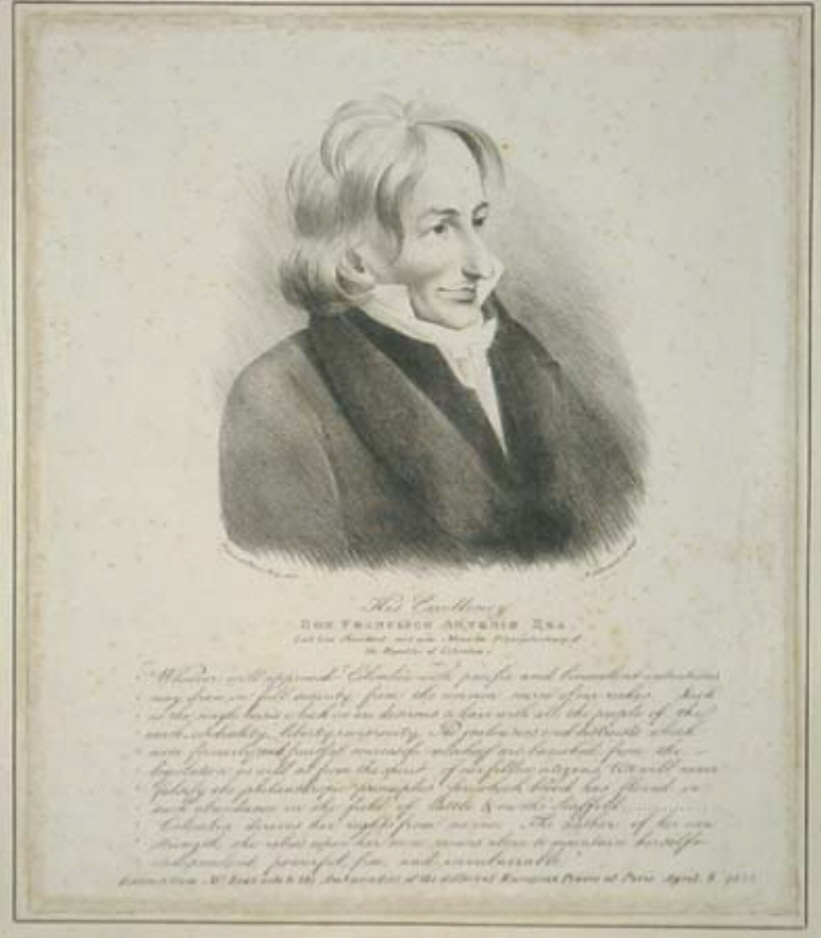
Lithograph by Rudolph Ackermann of His Excellency Ambassador Zea with the following extract of his letter inscribed.

"Whoever will approach Colombia with pacific benevolent intentions, may draw in full security from the common source of our riches. Such is the single basis which we are desirous to have with all the people of the earth cordiality, liberty, reciprocity. The jealousies and distrusts which were formally such fruitful sources of mischief are banished from the legislation as well as from the spirit of our fellow citizens. We will never falsify the philanthropic principles for which blood has flowed in such abundance on the field of battle & on the scaffold... Colombia derives her rights for no one. The author of her own strength, she relies upon her own means alone to maintain herself independent, powerful, free and invulnerable." – Extract from Mr. Zea's note to the Ambassadors of the different European Powers at Paris. 8 April 1822.

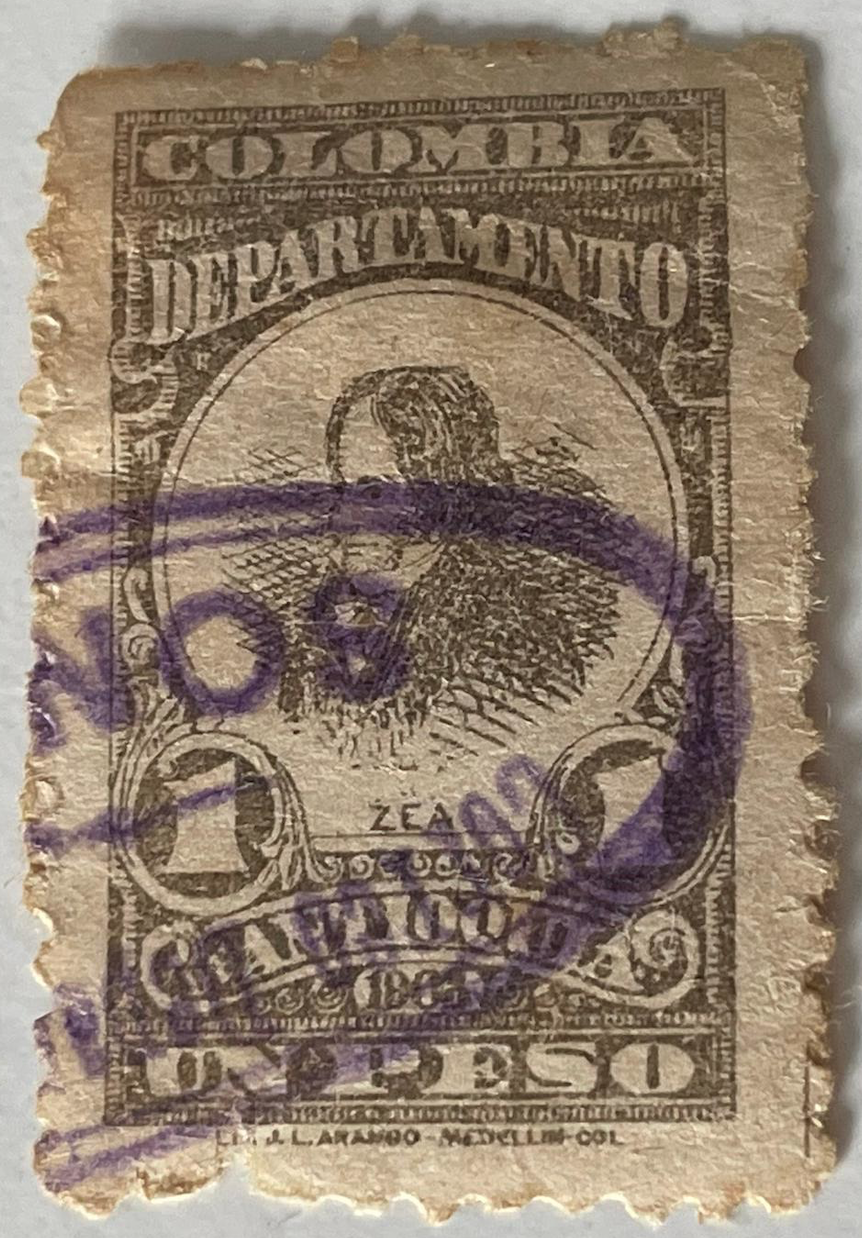
Stamp - Colombia - Francisco Antonio Zea - 1903

As Plenipotentiary Minister in the Exterior, Zea was tasked with obtaining financial help from the British, as well as restoring the image of the American colonies following the independence war. He returned to England in June 1822 with the objective of acquiring a loan of five million pounds sterling. In London he negotiated loans of financial creditors Herring & Richardson and gained recognition of his new country only from the United States. Zea was able to get support for the independentist cause from many of sympathetic Brits who called themselves Friends of South American Independence, among them some notable figures like the general Gregor MacGregor; Edward Adolphus St Maur, 11th Duke of Somerset; Sir James Mackintosh; Henry Petty-Fitzmaurice, 3rd Marquess of Lansdowne; William Wilberforce; Sir Benjamin Hobhouse; John Diston Powles, and various other members of the British Parliament, who on 10 July 1822 at the City of London Tavern had given him a dinner party in his honour and that of Colombia's as a way to show support and raise that much needed credit for Colombia. Zea however never saw the conclusion of his mission for he died shortly after.

== Death ==
Francisco Antonio Zea died after a dropsy crisis at the age of 56 on 28 November 1822, at the Royal York House Hotel, in Bath, Somerset, England, where he had gone to take refuge in the famous hot springs. His remains were later interred at Bath Abbey on 4 December 1822. On 26 June 1880, Venezuela paid a sum to the Comtesse de Rigny, and in 1890 the Senate of the Republic of Colombia paid the same sum of 20,000 pesos to her descendants.

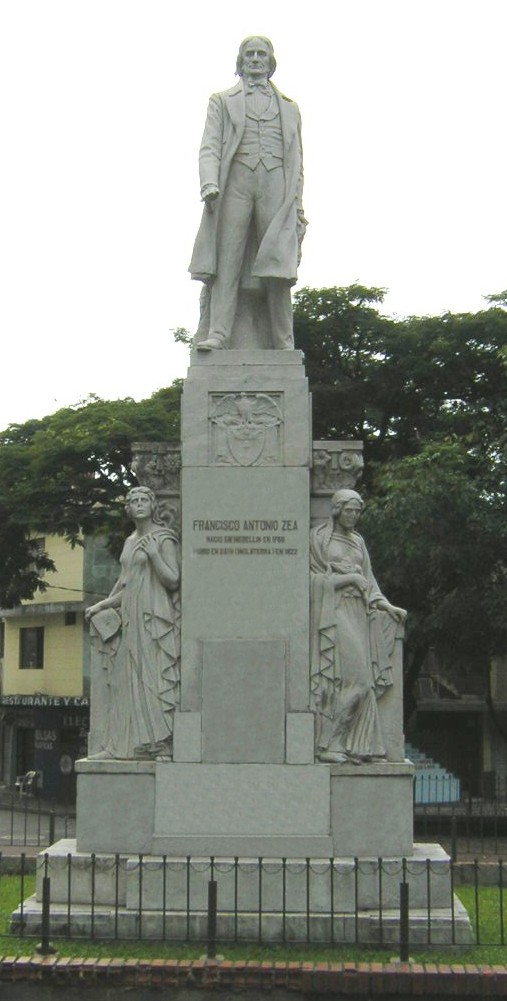
Statue of Francisco Antonio Zea, located at the Zea Plaza in Medellin, Antioquia.
