= Congress of Angostura =

South American revolutionary congress

Congress of Angostura Congreso de Angostura
- Second National Congress of Venezuela

Type
- Type: Unicameral constituent congress of Liberated provinces of Venezuela and Casanare Province, New Granada

History
- Founded: February 15, 1819
- Disbanded: July 31, 1821
- Preceded by: First National Congress of Venezuela
- Succeeded by: Bogotá Assembly of Notables (Recognition of the Republic of Colombia, 1820); Congress of Cúcuta (Ratification of the union and adoption of the Constitution, 1821)
- New session started: 10 July 1820 (extraordinary reconvening)

Leadership
- President at installation: Francisco Antonio Zea
- President when Constitution was adopted: Juan Germán Roscio since 15 August 1819
- President when Fundamental Law was adopted: Francisco Antonio Zea; 17 December 1819

Structure
- Seats: 30 deputies
- Committees: Permanent Deputation (one president and six deputies; established January 1820)
- Authority: Electoral Regulations for Representatives to the Second Congress of Venezuela (17 October 1818)
- Venezuelan provinces: 26 seats
- Casanare (New Granada): 4 seats

Elections
- Voting system: Direct restricted suffrage in military divisions and free parishes
- First election: 1818–1819
- Next election: 15 February 1819

Meeting place
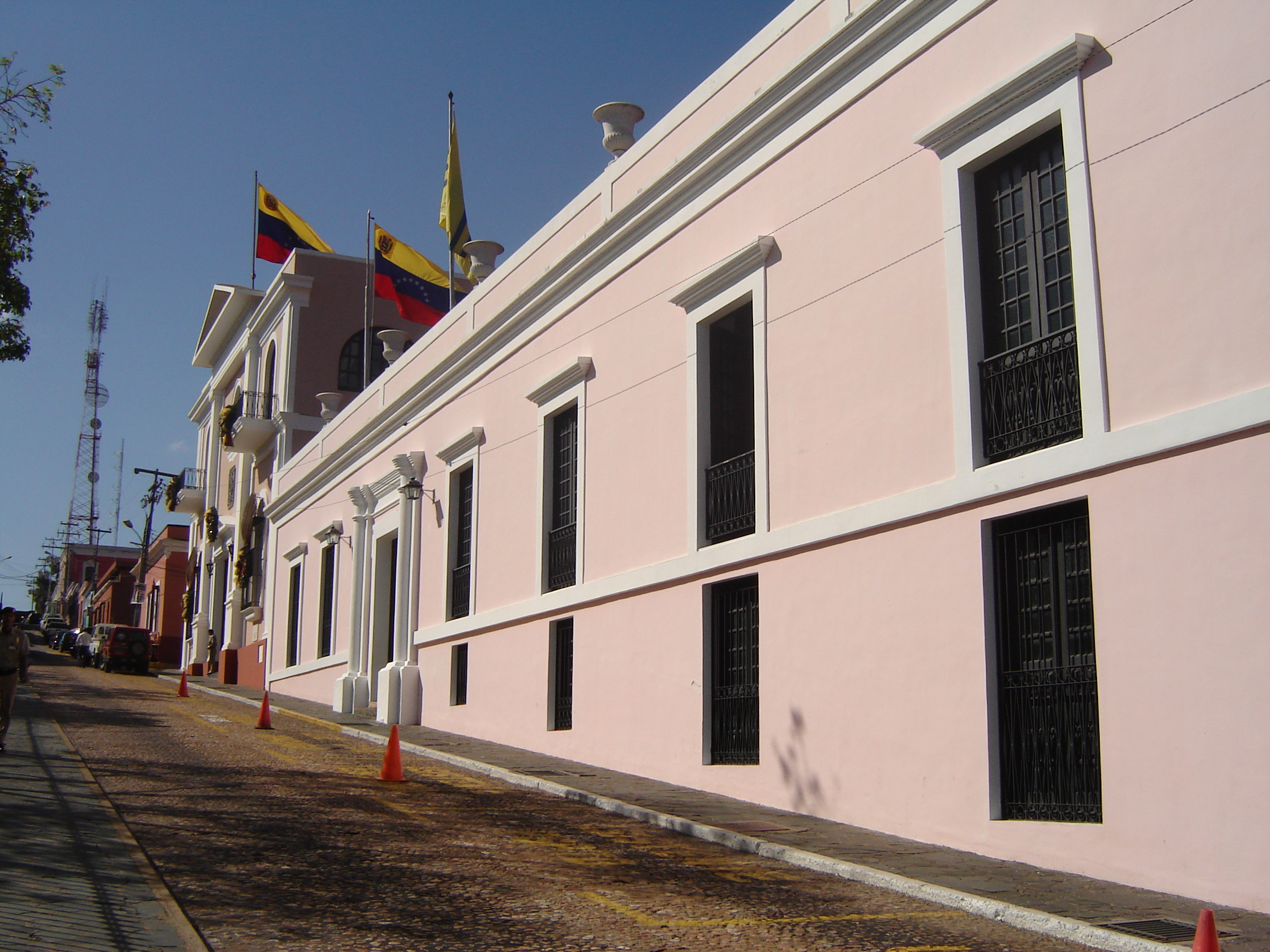
- Casa del Congreso de Angostura, Santo Tomás de Angostura, Guayana Province

Constitution
- Constitution of Venezuela (1819); Fundamental Law of the Republic of Colombia (1819)

Footnotes
- Simón Bolívar, interim president of Venezuela, while Francisco Antonio Zea became vice president of Venezuela.

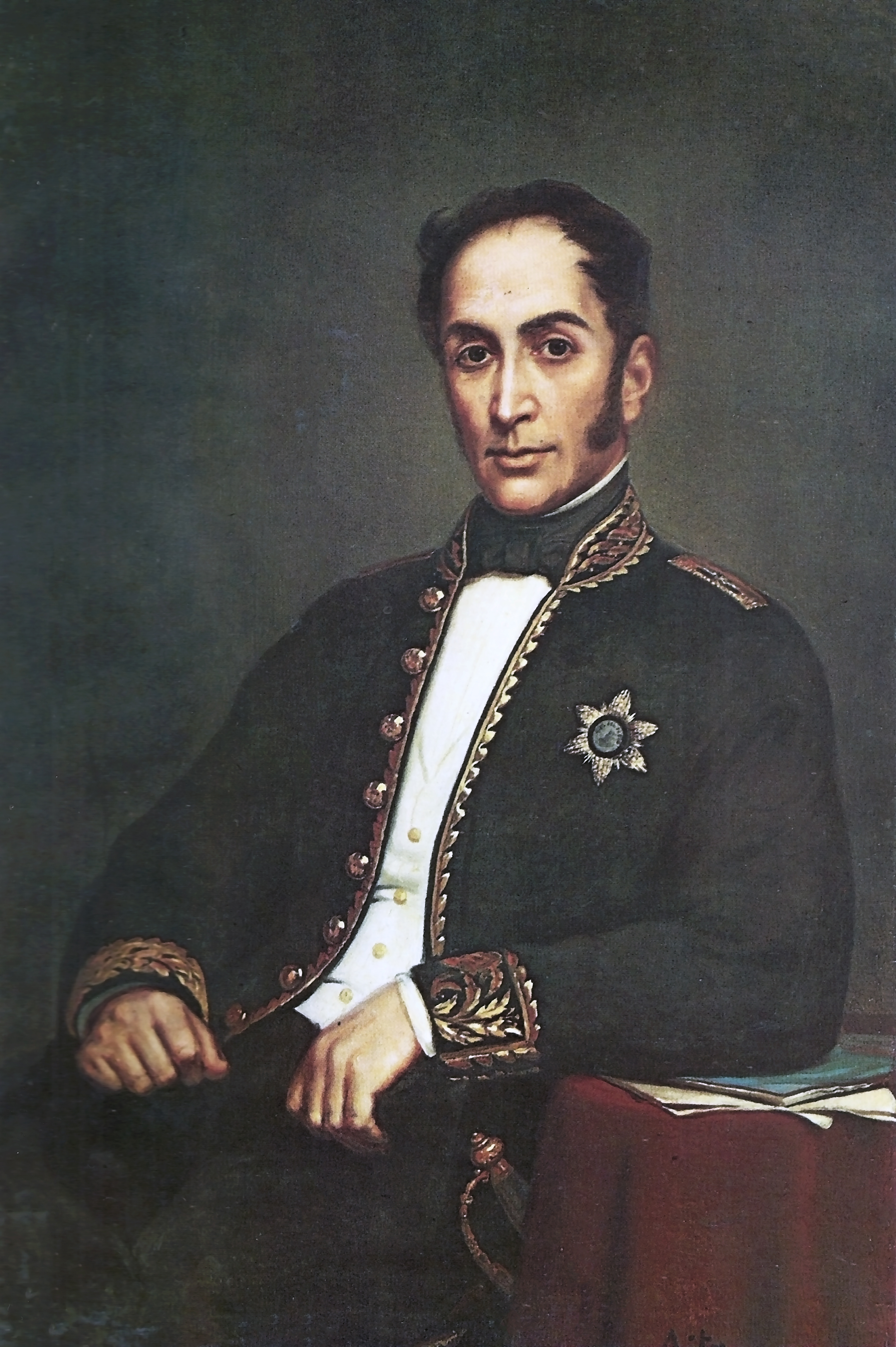
Simón Bolívar

The Congress of Angostura, also known as the Second National Congress of Venezuela, was a constituent assembly convened by Simón Bolívar in Angostura (today Ciudad Bolívar) during the venezuelan wars of independence. It started on 15 of february 1819 as the national congress of the re-established Republic of Venezuela. At the installation on 16 february 1819, the Angostura assembly consisted of twenty-six delegates representing six provinces of Venezuela, representatives of the only newgranadan liberated province, Casanare,subsequently joined the assembly.

== Historical background ==
Important parts of the countries were still under Spanish rule, so elections only took place in the areas of southern Venezuela and Margarita Island controlled by the patriot forces. The delegates from New Granada were chosen from among the exiles fighting alongside the Venezuelan patriots. At its first meeting on February 19, 1819, Bolivar gave his famous Address at Angostura, but not all of the proposals contained in it were accepted (most notably the suggestions of a highly exalted ceremonial president-for-life who would govern through powerful ministers accountable to parliament and a hereditary senate, both modeled on the British example, and a "fourth" branch of government, the "moral" one, loosely modeled on the Classical Areopagus).

The Congress of Angostura is considered Venezuela's second legislative congress, the first being the one that met in 1811. Its culminating piece of legislation was the Venezuelan Constitution of 1819, officially adopted on August 15, but quickly made obsolete by the creation of the Republic of Colombia on December 17, 1819. This new nation comprised Venezuela, New Granada (today Colombia and Panamá) and Quito (today Ecuador). In order to differentiate it from the present Republic of Colombia, historians have traditionally called the nation Gran Colombia. A constitution for the new nation was created at the Congress of Cúcuta in August 1821.

The congress established three large departments for the new country: Venezuela (corresponding to the modern country of Venezuela), Cundinamarca (what today is Colombia, Panama and some parts of Central America) and Quito (today Ecuador). Simon Bolívar was elected president, Francisco Antonio Zea vice president, Juan Germán Roscio vice president of Venezuela and Francisco de Paula Santander vice president of Cundinamarca.

== The Fundamental Law of the Republic of Colombia (1819) ==
=== Contents of the Fundamental Law ===
On December 17, 1819, the Fundamental Law of the Republic of Colombia (Ley Fundamental de Colombia, in Spanish) was enacted by the congressmen in the city of Angostura (nowadays Ciudad Bolívar). It consisted of fourteen articles in which the Republic of Gran Colombia established its political structure, in consideration of the fact that "the provinces of Venezuela and New Grenada (sic)" are "united in a single republic" that could not stand if divided in two different nations, even if they are "united by the closest ties". Therefore, the birth of Gran Colombia would be created "by necessity and mutual interest".

Basically, the document explained how Colombia was going to be as an independent nation, in relation to the reasons that motivated the political union of Venezuela and New Granada. The Fundamental Law of the Republic of Colombia was thus as follows:

1. In 1819, the Republic of Colombia is created from the fusion of Venezuela and New Granada, both nations with republican systems.
2. The captain-generalship of Venezuela and the viceroyalty of New Granada combine their territories, which comprise "an extent of a hundred and fifteen thousand square leagues".
3. The national debt of Colombia consolidates "in solidum" the debts of both Venezuela and New Granada.
4. The executive power is in the hands of the president and the vice-president, "both to be provisionally appointed by the present congress".
5. Venezuela, Quito, and Cundinamarca are the three great departments of Gran Colombia (this last being substituted for what previously had been called New Granada). Their respective capitals are Caracas, Quito, and Bogotá.
6. The departments have superior administrations and chiefs.
7. The capital of Colombia is named after Bolívar. Its "place and situation" is to be determined by the congress.
8. Rosario de Cúcuta shall be the village in which the congress of Colombia would assemble in January 1821.
9. The congress will form the Constitution of the Republic of Colombia.
10. In the same way, the congress shall determine "the arms and flag of Colombia". The colors will be the Venezuelan ones, "being most known".
11. On January 15, 1820, the congress "shall adjourn"; then new elections to the congress can take place.
12. The congress shall be replaced by a six-member committee and a president.
13. On December 25, 1819, "in commemoration of the birth of the Saviour of the world", the Republic of Colombia shall be proclaimed through public celebrations.
14. The aforesaid date, i.e., December 25th, shall be the anniversary of the Republic, due to its "political regeneration".

=== Deputies who signed the Fundamental Law ===
At the end of the Fundamental Law appeared the signatures of Francisco Antonio Zea, who was the president of the congress, and Diego de Vallenilla, a deputy and secretary. Other politicians who signed the document were: Juan Germán Roscio, Manuel Cedeño, Juan Martínez, José María Vergara y Lozano, José España, Luis Tomás Peraza, Antonio M. Briceño, Eusebio Afanador, Francisco Conde, Diego Bautista Urbaneja, Juan Vicente Cardozo, Ignacio Muñoz, Onofre Basalo, Domingo Alzuru, José Tomás Machado and Ramón García Cádiz.

Finally, Simón Bolívar approved the printing, publication and implementation of the Fundamental Law, with the stamp of the State.
