= Correo del Orinoco =

Venezuelan newspaper

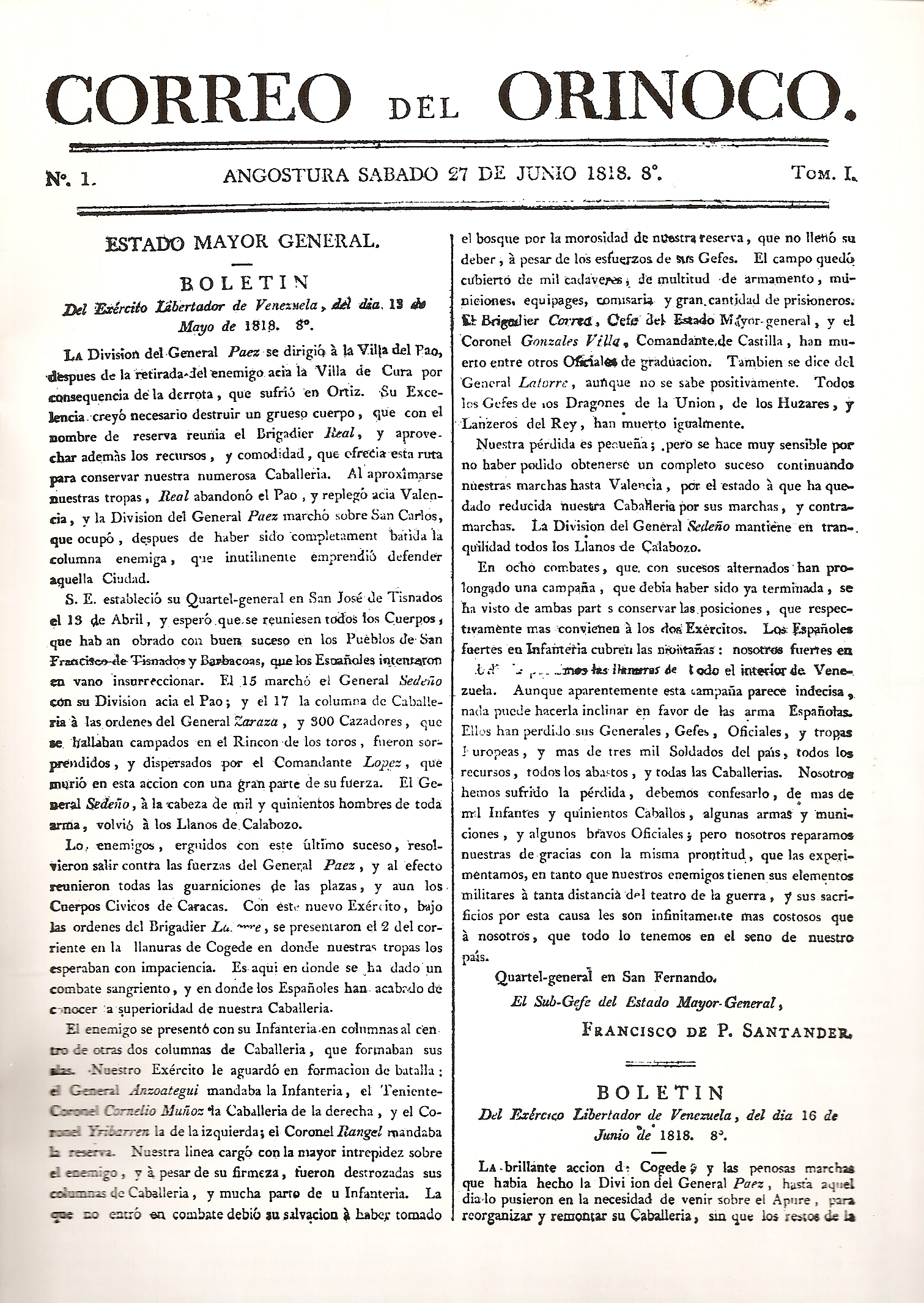
- Correo del Orinoco's first edition
- Type: Weekly newspaper
- Founder: Simón Bolívar
- Founded: 27 June 1818
- Ceased publication: 27 March 1822
- Language: Spanish
- City: Angostura

Correo del Orinoco (the Orinoco Post) was a newspaper founded by Simón Bolívar and published in Venezuela. It was the first independent newspaper both in South America and in Latin America in general.

The newspaper was published weekly from 1818 to 1822 in Angostura (now Ciudad Bolívar), a city on the Orinoco River.

The newspaper's name is now used by the Correo del Orinoco newspaper, produced by the Government of Venezuela.

== See also ==
- List of newspapers in Venezuela
