= Gran Colombia =

Republic in South and Central America from 1819 to 1831

Coordinates: 4°39′N 74°03′W

Republic of Colombia República de Colombia (Spanish)
- 1819–1831
- Top: Flag (1819–1820); Bottom: Flag (1821–1830) Emblem (1821–1831)
- Motto: Unión (Spanish)
- Territory claimed by Gran Colombia (does not include Mosquito Coast)
- Capital: Bogotá
- Common languages: Spanish and Indigenous languages
- Religion: Roman Catholicism (official)
- Demonyms: Gran Colombian; Colombian
- Government: Federal presidential republic
- Presidents
  - 1819–1830: Simón Bolívar; Estanislao Vergara y Sanz de Santamaría
  - 1830, 1831: Domingo Caycedo
  - 1830, 1831: Joaquín Mosquera
  - 1830–1831: Rafael Urdaneta
- Vice Presidents
  - 1819–1820: Francisco Antonio Zea
  - 1820–1821: Juan Germán Roscio
  - 1821: Antonio Nariño y Álvarez
  - 1821: José María del Castillo
  - 1821–1827: Francisco de Paula Santander
  - 1830–1831: Domingo Caycedo
- Legislature: Congress
  - Upper Chamber: Senate
  - Lower Chamber: Chamber of Representatives
- History
  - Established: December 17, 1819
  - Constitution of Cúcuta: August 30, 1821
  - Colombia – Peru War: 1828–1829
  - Dissolution: November 19, 1831

Area
  - Total: 3,064,800 km^{2} (1,183,300 sq mi)

Population
  - 1825: 2,583,799
  - Density: 0.84/km^{2} (2.2/sq mi)
- Currency: Piastra, real
Preceded by
Viceroyalty of New Granada
Captaincy General of Venezuela
American Confederation of Venezuela
Succeeded by
Republic of New Granada
State of Venezuela
Ecuador
British Guiana

Gran Colombia (Spanish pronunciation: [ˈɡɾaŋ koˈlombja], "Great Colombia"), also known as Greater Colombia and officially the Republic of Colombia (Spanish: República de Colombia), was the Colombian state that encompassed much of northern South America and parts of Central America from 1819 to 1831. It included present-day Colombia, mainland Ecuador, Panama, Venezuela, parts of northern Peru, northwestern Brazil, and claimed the Essequibo region. The terms Gran Colombia and Greater Colombia are used historiographically to distinguish it from the current Republic of Colombia, which is also the official name of the former state.

International recognition of the legitimacy of the Gran Colombian state ran afoul of European opposition to the independence of states in the Americas. Austria, France, and the Russian Empire only recognized independence in the Americas if the new states accepted monarchs from European royal houses. In addition, Colombia and the international powers disagreed over the extension of the Colombian territory and its boundaries.

Gran Colombia was proclaimed through the Fundamental Law of the Republic of Colombia, issued during the Congress of Angostura (1819), but did not come into being until the Congress of Cúcuta (1821) promulgated the Constitution of Cúcuta. It was constituted as a unitary centralist state. Its existence was marked by a struggle between those who supported a centralized government with a strong presidency and those who supported a decentralized, federal form of government. At the same time, another political division emerged between those who supported the Constitution of Cúcuta and two groups who sought to do away with the Constitution, either in favor of breaking up the country into smaller republics or maintaining the union but creating an even stronger presidency. The faction that favored constitutional rule coalesced around Vice-President Francisco de Paula Santander, while those who supported the creation of a stronger presidency were led by President Simón Bolívar. They had united in their fight against Spanish rule, but by 1825, their public differences contributed to political instability.

Gran Colombia was dissolved in 1831 due to the political differences that existed between supporters of federalism and centralism, as well as regional tensions among the peoples that made up the republic. It broke into the successor states of Colombia, Ecuador, and Venezuela; Panama was separated from Colombia in 1903. Since Gran Colombia's territory corresponded more or less to the original jurisdiction of the former Viceroyalty of New Granada, it also claimed the southeastern part of the Mosquito Shore, as well as most of Esequiba.

== Etymology ==
Its proclaimed name was the Republic of Colombia. Historians have adopted the term "Gran Colombia" to distinguish this republic from the present-day Republic of Colombia, which began using the name in 1863, although many use Colombia where the confusion would not arise.

The word "Colombia" is the Castilian version of the eighteenth-century Neo-Latin word "Columbia" which derives from the family name of the Genoese explorer Christopher Columbus. It was the term proposed by the Venezuelan revolutionary Francisco de Miranda to denote the New World region of the Western Hemisphere, especially all American territories and colonies under Spanish colonial rule. He used an improvised, quasi-Greek adjectival version of the name, "Colombia", to mean papers and things "relating to Colombia," as the title of the archive of his revolutionary activities.

Simón Bolívar and other Spanish American revolutionaries also used the word "Colombia" in the continental sense. The 1819 proclamation of a country with the name "Colombia" by the Congress of Angostura gave the term a specific geographic and political reference.

== Demographics ==
A map of all territory controlled and claimed by Gran Colombia, showing rivers.

The total population of Gran Colombia after independence was 2,583,799, lower than the 2,900,000 population of the territory before independence. Indians numbered 1,200,000 people, or 50% of the population. In the modern-day territory of Colombia, the population was 1,327,000, including 700,000 Indians, who made up 53% of the population of the territory of Colombia.

	District	Total population
	Norte (Venezuela)	686,212
	Centro (New Granada)	1,373,110
	Sur (Ecuador)	544,477
Total	Gran Colombia	2,533,799

== History ==
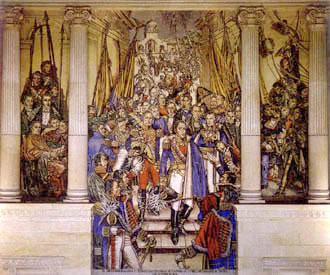
A mural by Santiago Martinez Delgado at the Colombian Congress representing the Congress of Cúcuta

In 1821, it was proclaimed by the Congress of Cúcuta in the Constitution of Cúcuta and had been promulgated through the Fundamental Law of the Republic of Colombia during the Congress of Angostura (1819). The territory it claimed loosely corresponded to the former territories of the Viceroyalty of New Granada (1739–1777), which it claimed under the legal principle of uti possidetis. It united the territories of the former Third Republic of Venezuela, the United Provinces of New Granada, the former Royal Audiencia of Panama, and the Presidency of Quito (which was still under Spanish rule in 1821).

Since the new country was proclaimed soon after Bolívar's unexpected victory in New Granada, its government was temporarily set up as a federal republic, made up of three departments headed by a vice-president and with capitals in the cities of Bogotá (Cundinamarca Department), Caracas (Venezuela Department), and Quito (Quito Department). In that year, some provinces of Quito, Venezuela, and New Granada were still not free.

The Constitution of Cúcuta was drafted in 1821 at the Congress of Cúcuta, establishing the republic's capital in Bogotá. The Congress appointed Bolívar and Santander as the country's president and vice-president. A great degree of centralization was established by the assembly at Cúcuta since several New Granadian and Venezuelan deputies of the Congress who formerly had been ardent federalists now began to believe that centralism was necessary to successfully manage the war against the royalists.

To break up regionalist tendencies and to set up efficient central control of local administration, a new territorial division was implemented in 1824. The departments of Venezuela, Cundinamarca, and Quito were split into smaller departments, each governed by an intendant appointed by the central government, with the same powers that Bourbon intendants had. Realizing that not all of the provinces were represented at Cúcuta because many areas of the country remained in royalist hands, the congress called for a new constitutional convention to meet in ten years.

In its first years, it helped other provinces still at war with Spain to become independent: all of Venezuela except Puerto Cabello was liberated at the Battle of Carabobo, Panama joined the federation in November 1821, and the provinces of Pasto, Guayaquil, and Quito in 1822. That year Colombia became the first Spanish American republic recognized by the United States, due to the efforts of diplomat Manuel Torres. Its army later consolidated the independence of Peru in 1824.

Bolívar and Santander were reappointed by the national congress in 1826.

=== Federalists and separatists ===
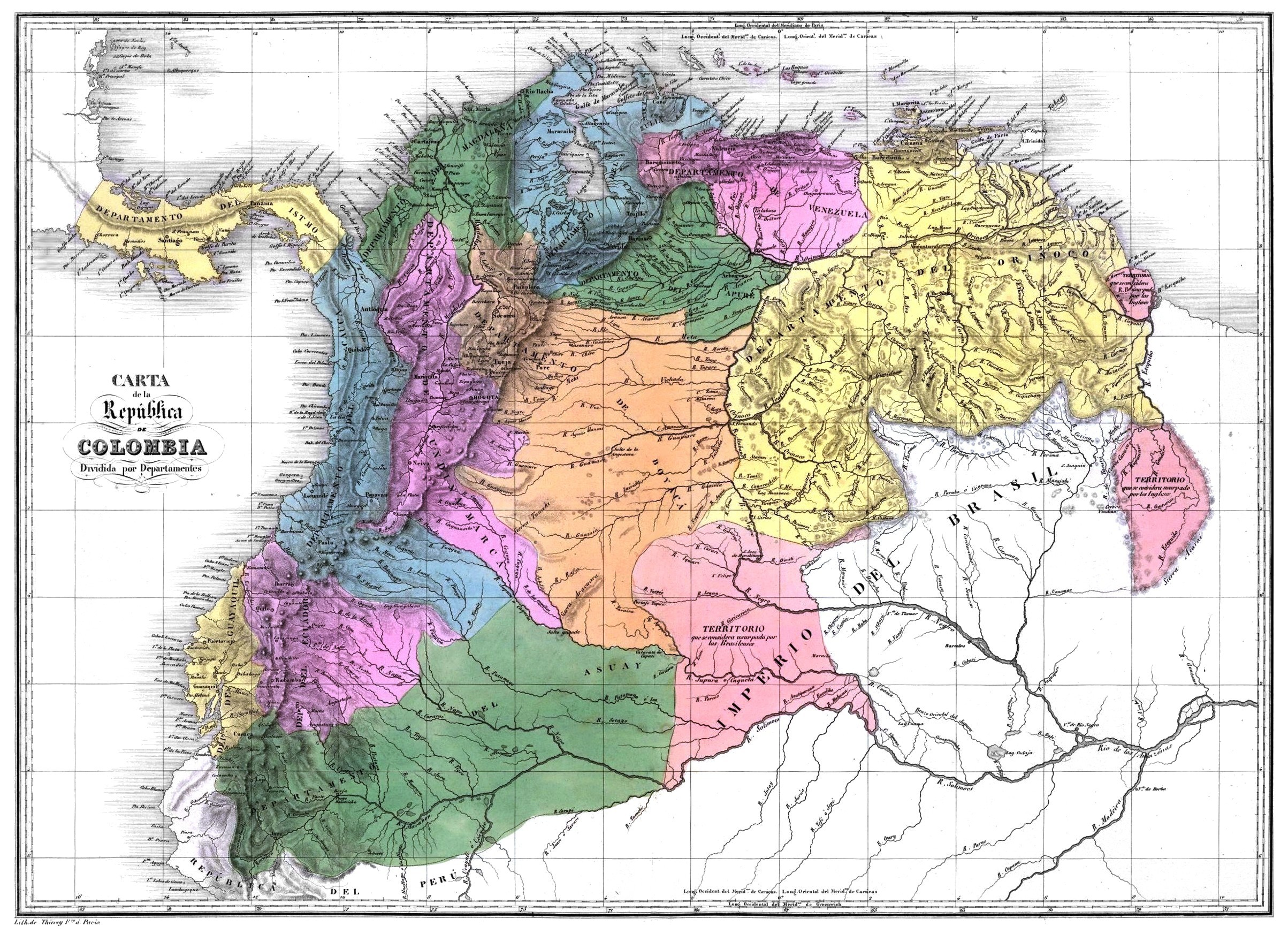
A 1840 map of Gran Colombia showing the 12 departments created in 1824 and eastern territories disputed with neighboring countries. The Mosquito Coast is not indicated as disputed or part of Colombia.

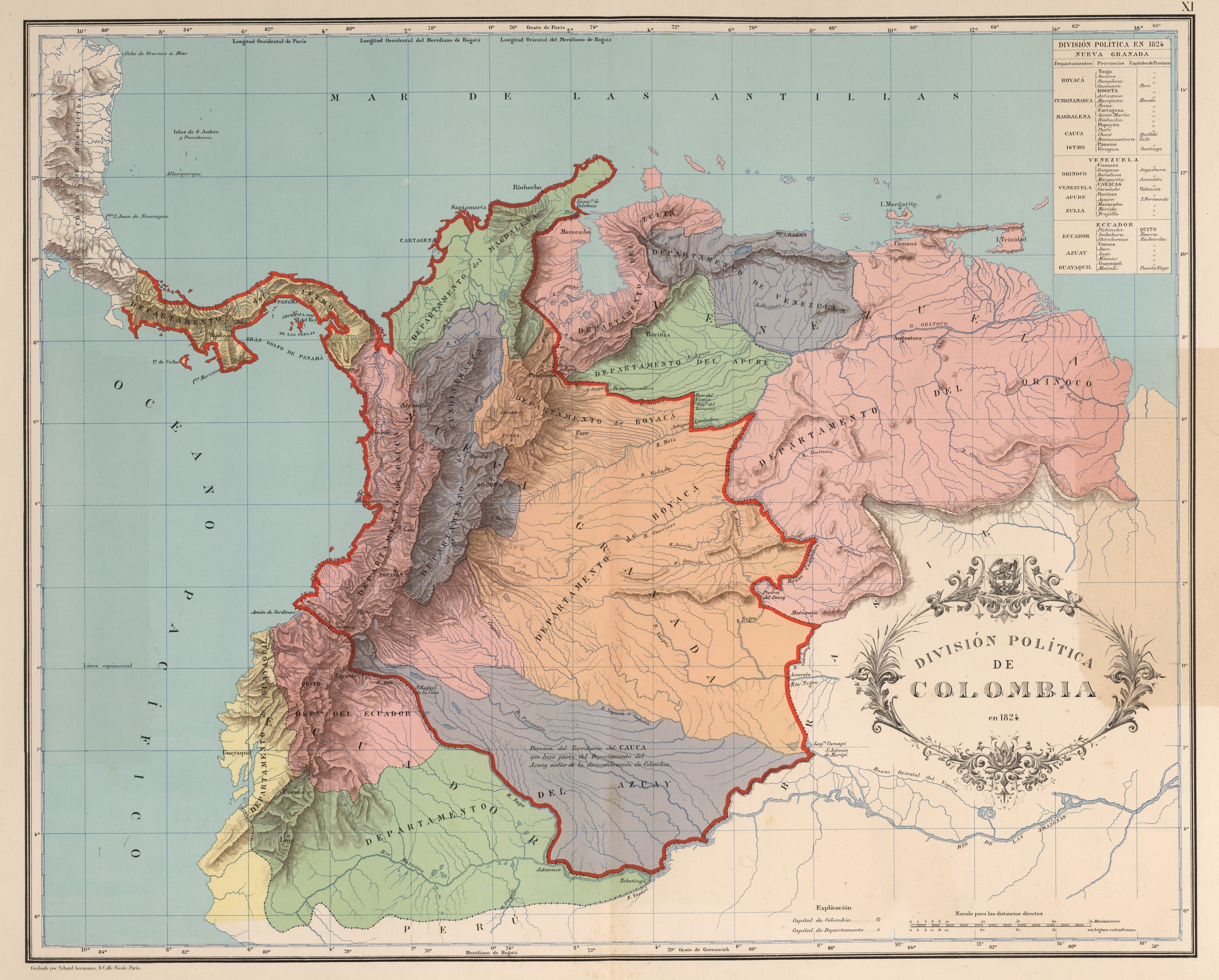
The departments of Gran Colombia in 1824 as shown on an 1890 map. Not including some disputed territory

Gran Colombia was constituted as a unitary centralist state. Its history was marked by a struggle between those who supported a centralized government with a strong presidency and those who supported a decentralized, federal form of government. At the same time, another political division emerged between those who supported the Constitution of Cúcuta and two groups who sought to do away with the constitution, either in favor of breaking up the country into smaller republics or maintaining the union but creating an even stronger presidency.

The faction that favored constitutional rule and a federal state coalesced around Vice President Francisco de Paula Santander, while those who supported the creation of a stronger presidency and national unity were led by President Simón Bolívar. They had fought together against Spanish rule, but by 1825, their differences were public and contributed to political instability.

As the war against Spain reached an end in the mid-1820s, federalist and regionalist sentiments that had been suppressed for the sake of the war arose once again. Calls emerged for a reshaping of the political divide, and related economic and commercial disputes between regions resurfaced. Ecuador harbored significant economic and political grievances. Since the end of the eighteenth century, its textile industry had suffered because cheaper textiles were being imported.

After independence, it adopted a low-tariff policy, which benefited agricultural regions such as Venezuela. From 1820 to 1825, the area was ruled directly by Bolívar because of the extraordinary powers granted to him. His top priority was the war in Peru against the royalists, not solving Ecuador's economic problems.

Having been incorporated later, Ecuador was also underrepresented in all branches of the central government, and Ecuadorians had little opportunity to rise to command positions in its army. Even local political offices were often staffed by Venezuelans and New Granadans. No outright separatist movement emerged in Ecuador, but these problems were never resolved in the ten-year existence of the country.

The strongest calls for a federal arrangement instead came from Venezuela, where there was strong federalist sentiment among the region's liberals, many of whom had not fought in the war of independence but had supported Spanish liberalism in the previous decade and who now allied themselves with the conservative Commandant General of the Department of Venezuela, José Antonio Páez, against the central government.

In 1826, Venezuela came close to seceding. That year, Congress began impeachment proceedings against Páez, who resigned his post on April 28 but reassumed it two days later in defiance of the central government.

In July and August, the municipal government of Guayaquil and a junta in Quito issued declarations of support for Páez's actions. Bolívar, for his part, used the developments to promote the conservative constitution he had just written for Bolivia, which found support among conservative Ecuadorians and the Venezuelan military officialdom but was generally met with indifference or outright hostility among other sectors of society and, most importantly for future political developments, by Vice President Santander himself.

In November, two assemblies met in Venezuela to discuss the future of the region, but no formal independence was declared at either. That same month, skirmishes broke out between the supporters of Páez and Bolívar in the east and south of Venezuela. By the end of the year, Bolívar was in Maracaibo preparing to march into Venezuela with an army, if necessary. Ultimately, political compromises prevented this. In January, Bolívar offered the rebellious Venezuelans a general amnesty and the promise to convene a new constituent assembly before the ten-year period established by the Constitution of Cúcuta, and Páez backed down and recognized Bolívar's authority. Different political factions were never fully satisfied by the reforms, and they failed to achieve permanent consolidation. The instability of the state's structure was now apparent to all.

In 1828, the new constituent assembly, the Convention of Ocaña, began its sessions. At its opening, Bolívar again proposed a new constitution based on the Bolivian one, but this suggestion continued to be unpopular. The convention fell apart when pro-Bolívar delegates walked out rather than sign a federalist constitution. After this failure, Bolívar believed that by centralizing his constitutional powers he could prevent the separatists (the New Granadians represented mainly by Francisco de Paula Santander and José María Obando, and the Venezuelans by José Antonio Páez) from bringing down the union. He ultimately failed to do so.

As the collapse of the country became evident in 1830, Bolívar resigned from the presidency. Internal political strife between the different regions intensified even as General Rafael Urdaneta temporarily took power in Bogotá, attempting to use his authority to ostensibly restore order but actually hoping to convince Bolívar to return to the presidency and the country to accept him. The federation dissolved in the closing months of 1830 and was formally abolished in 1831. Venezuela, Ecuador, and New Granada came to exist as independent states.

=== War with Peru ===
On 3 June 1828, Bolívar declared war on Peru over Gran Colombian claims on the Peruvian territories of Jaén and Maynas. The war ended in the Treaty of Guayaquil, which was signed on 22 September 1829 and went into effect on 27 October 1829.

=== Aftermath ===
The dissolution of Gran Colombia represented the failure of Bolívar's vision. The former republic was replaced by the republics of Venezuela, Ecuador, and New Granada. The former Department of Cundinamarca (as established in 1819 at the Congress of Angostura) became a new country, the Republic of New Granada. In 1858, New Granada was replaced by the Granadine Confederation.

In 1863, the Granadine Confederation changed its name officially to the United States of Colombia and, in 1886, adopted its present-day name: the Republic of Colombia. Panama, which voluntarily became part of it in 1821, remained a department of the Republic of Colombia until 1903 when, in great part as a consequence of the Thousand Days War of 1899–1902, it became independent under intense American pressure. The United States wanted territorial rights in the future Panama Canal Zone, which Colombia had refused.

With the exception of Panama, which achieved independence seven decades later, the countries that were created have similar flags, reminiscent of the flag of Gran Colombia:

Current flags of Gran Colombia successor states

Colombia

Ecuador

Venezuela

== Government ==
Before a new constitution could be written by the 1821 Congress of Cúcuta, the 1819 Congress of Angostura appointed Bolívar and Santander president and vice president, respectively. Under the Constitution of Cúcuta, the country was divided into twelve departments, each governed by an intendant. Departments were further divided into thirty-six provinces, each headed by a governor, who had overlapping powers with the intendant. Military affairs at the department level were overseen by a commandant general, who could also be the intendant. The central government appointed all three offices. The central government, which temporarily was to reside in Bogotá, consisted of a presidency, a bicameral congress, and a high court (the Alta Corte).

The president was the head of the executive branch of both the central and local governments. The president could be granted extraordinary powers in military fronts, such as the area that became Ecuador. The vice-president assumed the presidency in case of the absence, death, demotion, or illness of the president. Since President Bolívar was absent from Gran Colombia for the early years of its existence, executive power was wielded by the vice president, Santander. The vote was given to individuals who owned 100 pesos in landed property or had an equivalent income from a profession. Elections were indirect.

== Confederation status ==
In Peru, the dissolution of Gran Colombia signifies the end of a country and the emergence of new nation-states. The significance of this view is that the treaties Peru had signed with Gran Colombia became void when the countersignatory ceased to exist. The three new states, the Republic of New Granada (which later changed its name to the Republic of Colombia), the Republic of Venezuela, and the Republic of Ecuador, in the Peruvian view, started with a clean diplomatic slate.

An alternative view is that Ecuador and Venezuela separated from the Gran Colombian Federation and inherited all of the treaty obligations that Gran Colombia had assumed, at least to the extent that they apply to their respective territories. There are indications that Colombia itself maintained this position; Gran Colombia and its successor state, the Republic of Colombia, shared a capital city, a subset of the same territory, and much the same citizenry. It would be unnatural to disavow their common histories.

The question of the status of treaties and accords dating to the revolutionary period (1809–1819) and Gran Colombia period (1819–1830) has a profound effect on international relations to the present day.

=== Reunification attempts ===
There have been attempts at the reunification of Gran Colombia since the separation of Panama from Colombia in 1903. People in favor of reunification are called "unionistas" or unionists. In 2008, the Bolivarian News Agency reported that the then-President of Venezuela Hugo Chávez announced a proposal for a political restoration of Gran Colombia under the Bolivarian Revolution.

== See also ==
- Federal Republic of Central America—another post-independence state on the American continent that underwent a similar fate, made up of modern Guatemala, Honduras, Nicaragua, El Salvador, and Costa Rica.
- Flag of Gran Colombia
- Peru–Bolivian Confederation
- Reunification of Gran Colombia
- Campaigns of the South
- History of South America

== Bibliography ==
- Bushnell, David (1970). The Santander regime in Gran Colombia. Westport, Conn: Greenwood Press. ISBN 978-0-8371-2981-5. OCLC 258393.
- Gibson, William Marion (1948). The Constitutions of Colombia. Durham, NC: Duke University Press. OCLC 3118881. OL 6035626M.
- Lynch, John (2006). Simón Bolívar: a life. New Haven (Conn.): Yale University Press. ISBN 978-0-300-11062-3.
- Dean, Malcolm; MacFarlane, Anthony; Brown, Matthew (2010) The Role of Great Britain on the Independence of Colombia.Republic of Colombia Ministry of Foreign Affairs.
