= List of governors of Venezuela Province =

Governor of Venezuela Province
- Coat of arms of Venezuela

- Flag of Spain
- Style: Governor
- Status: Head of State
- Inaugural holder: Juan Martínez de Ampiés
- Formation: 1527

The following is a list of governors of Venezuela Province, one of the Provinces of the Spanish Empire.

== List of governors ==
Governors
Date	Name
1527 - 1529	Juan Martínez de Ampiés
1529 - 1531	Ambrose von Alfinger
1531 - 1533	Bartolomé de Santillana (Bartholomew Sayler)
1534 - 1535	Rodrigo de Bastidas
1535 - 1540	Jorge de la Espira (Georg Hoemuth)
1540 - 1542	Rodrigo de Bastidas
1542 - 1544	Enrique Rembold (Heinrich Remboldt)
1545 - 1546	Juan de Carvajal
1546 - 1549	Juan Pérez de Tolosa
1549 - 1553	Juan de Villegas Maldonado
1553 - 1557	Alonso Arias de Villasinda
1557 - 1559	Gutiérrez de la Peña Langayo
1559 - 1561	Pablo Collado
1562 - 1563	Alonso Pérez de Manzanedo
1564 - 1566	Alonso Bernáldez de Quirós
1566 - 1569	Pedro Ponce de León y Riquelme
1569 - 1570	Francisco Hernández de Chaves
1570 - 1576	Diego de Mazariegos
1576 - 1583	Juan de Pimentel
1583 - 1589	Luis de Rojas y Mendoza
1589 - 1597	Diego de Osorio
1591 - 1600	Gonzalo de Piña y Ludueña
1600 - 1602	Alonso Arias Vaca
1602 - 1603	Alonso Suárez del Castillo
1603 - 1606	Francisco Mejía de Godoy
1606 - 1611	Sancho de Alquiza
1611 - 1616	García Girón de Loayza
1616 - 1621	Francisco de la Hoz Berrío
1621 - 1623	Juan Treviño Guillamas
1623	Diego Gil de la Sierpe
1624 - 1630	Juan de Meneses y Padilla, marqués de Marianela
1630 - 1637	Francisco Núñez Melián
1637 - 1644	Ruy Fernández de Fuenmayor
1644 - 1649	Marcos Gedler Calatayud y Toledo
1649 - 1651	Pedro de León Villaroel
1652 - 1653	Diego Francisco de Quero y Figueroa
1654 - 1655	Martín de Roble y Villafañe
1656 - 1658	Andrés de Vera y Moscoso
1658 - 1664	Pedro de Porres Toledo y Vozmediano, conde de Dabois
1664 - 1669	Félix Garcí-González de León
1669 - 1673	Fernando de Villegas
1673 - 1674	Francisco Dávila Orejón y Gastón

Alcaldes
Date	Name
1677 - 1682	Francisco de Alberró
1682 - 1688	Diego de Melo Maldonaldo
1688 - 1692	Diego Jiménez de Enciso, marqués de Casal de los Griegos
1692 - 1693	Francisco Bartolomé Bravo de Anaya
1693 - 1699	Francisco de Berroterán y Gainza, marqués del Valle de Santiago
1699 - 1704	Nicolás Eugenio de Ponte y Hoyo
1704 - 1706	Francisco de Berroterán y Gainza, marqués del Valle de Santiago
1706 - 1711	Fernando de Rojas y Mendoza
1711 - 1714	José Francisco de Cañas y Merino
1715 - 1716	Alberto Bertodano y Navarra
1716 - 1720	Marcos Francisco de Betancourt y Castro
1721	Antonio José Álvarez de Abreu
1721 - 1724	Diego de Portales y Meneses

Alcaldía Conjunta
Date	Name
24/02/1724 - 01/01/1725	Francisco Carlos de Herrera / Ruy Fernández de Fuenmayor
01/01/1725 - 25/06/1726	Gerónimo de Rada / Miguel Rengifo Pimentel
25/06/1726 - 15/07/1726	Domingo Antonio de Tovar / Diego Antonio de Liendo y Blanco

Governors
Date	Name
15/07/1726 - 29/06/1728	Diego de Portales y Meneses
29/06/1728 - 31/08/1730	Lope Carrillo de Andrade Sotomayor y Pimentel
31/08/1730 - 15/12/1732	Sebastián García de la Torre
15/12/1732 - 06/10/1736	Martín de Lardizábal y Elorza
06/10/1736 - 12/06/1747	Gabriel de Zuloaga, conde de Torre Alta
12/06/1747 - 01/12/1749	Luis Francisco de Castellanos
01/12/1749 - 22/06/1751	Julián de Arriaga y Ribera
22/06/1751 - 09/09/1757	Felipe Ricardos
09/09/1757 - 12/11/1763	Felipe de Estenoz
12/11/1763 - 04/04/1771	José Solano y Bote, marqués del Socorro
04/04/1771 - 21/10/1771	Felipe de Font de Viela y Ondiano, marqués de la Torre
21/10/1771 - 25/02/1772	Francisco de Arce
25/02/1772 - 17/06/1777	José Carlos de Agüero

Captains General (from 8 September 1777)
Date	Name
17/06/1777 - 10/12/1782	Luis de Unzaga y Amézaga
10/12/1782 - 24/12/1782	Pedro de Nava
24/12/1782 - 14/02/1786	Manuel González Torres de Navarra
14/02/1786 - 01/10/1792	Juan Guillelmi
01/10/1792 - 10/01/1799	Pedro Carbonell Pinto Vigo y Correa
10/01/1799 - 06/04/1799	Joaquín de Subillaga
06/04/1799 - 09/10/1807	Manuel de Guevara y Vasconcelos
09/10/1807 - 19/05/1809	Juan de Casas y Barrera
19/05/1809 - 19/04/1810	Vicente Emparan y Orbe

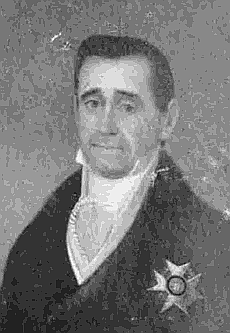
Francisco Tomás Morales

Captains General during the War of Independence
Date	Name
19/04/1810 - 22/06/1812	Fernando Miyares y Gonzáles
22/06/1812 - 28/12/1813	Juan Domingo de Monteverde
28/12/1813 - 01/12/1815	Juan Manuel de Cajigal y Niño
01/12/1815 - 20/11/1820	Pablo Morillo
20/11/1820 - 24/06/1821	Miguel de la Torre
24/06/1821 - 03/08/1823	Francisco Tomás Morales
