= Cajigal =

Cajigal may refer to:

- 12359 Cajigal, main belt asteroid with a perihelion of 2.6828106 AU
- Francisco Cajigal de la Vega (born 1715), Spanish military officer, governor of Cuba from 1747 to 1760
- Juan Manuel Cajigal (born 1754), Spanish Captain General born in Cádiz
- Juan Manuel Cajigal Municipality, one of the 21 municipios that make up the eastern Venezuelan state of Anzoátegui
- Juan Manuel Cajigal y Odoardo (1803–1856), Venezuelan mathematician, engineer and statesman
