= Cristóbal Mendoza =

Venezuelan lawyer, politician, and writer (1772–1829)

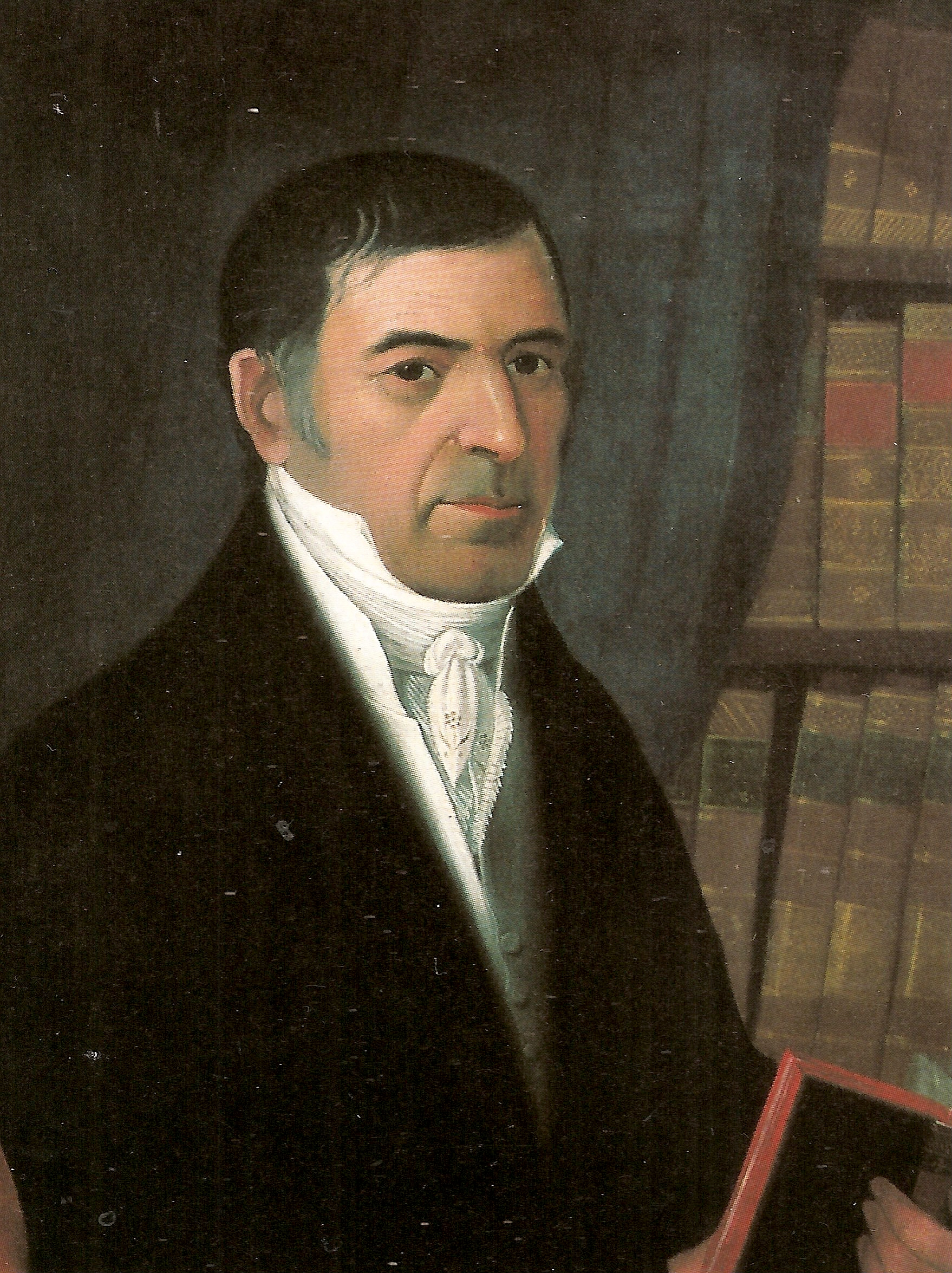
- Portrait by Juan Lovera, 1825

1st President of the First Republic of Venezuela
- In office 5 March 1811 – 21 March 1812
- Preceded by: Office established; Francisco Tomás Morales as Captain General of Venezuela
- Succeeded by: Francisco Espejo

Personal details
- Born: José Cristóbal Hurtado de Mendoza y Montilla; 23 June 1772 Trujillo, Viceroyalty of New Granada, Spanish Empire
- Died: 8 February 1829 (aged 56) Caracas, Gran Colombia (now Venezuela)
- Spouse(s): Juana Mendoza Briceño Mendez; Maria Regina Montilla Pumar; Gertudis Buroz Tovar

José Cristóbal Hurtado de Mendoza y Montilla (23 June 1772 – 8 February 1829), commonly known as Cristóbal Mendoza, was a Venezuelan lawyer, politician, writer, and academic. Cristóbal is best known for serving as the first official President of Venezuela from 1811 to 1812. After earning a master's degree in philosophy in Caracas and his doctor utriusque juris (Doctor of Canon and Civil Law) in the Dominican Republic, early in his professional career he served in various law firms in Trujillo, Mérida, and Caracas. He moved to Barinas in 1796 to practice law, and in 1807 was elected Mayor of Barinas. In 1810, Mendoza joined the insurgent movement started by wealthy Caracan citizens against the Spanish crown, and in 1811 was elected to represent the province of Barinas in the newly founded Constituent Congress of Venezuela. Days later he was appointed the first president of the First Republic of Venezuela, a role he shared as part of a triumvirate. Until his term ended in March 1812, Mendoza began the war for independence against the parts of Venezuela that still supported the Spanish monarchy, authored the Venezuelan Declaration of Independence, and also took part in constructing the first Constitution of the Republic of Venezuela.

In 1813 Mendoza fled a royalist invasion and moved to Grenada, and soon after he joined Simón Bolívar's effort to liberate South America from Spanish rule. Bolivar appointed Mendoza the governor of Mérida in May 1813, and Mendoza was appointed governor of Caracas several months later. Fleeing Venezuela again in 1814 when José Tomás Boves conquered Caracas, Mendoza moved to Trinidad, where from 1819 and 1820 he was an active political writer for the Correo del Orinoco. In 1826, Francisco de Paula Santander appointed Mendoza as Mayor of the Department of Venezuela in the empire of Gran Colombia. After a short exile under General José Antonio Páez, in 1827 Bolivar re-appointed him Mayor of the Department of Venezuela, a role Medoza kept until resigning in the middle of 1828. In commemoration of Mendoza, in 1972, Venezuela enacted National Lawyer Day (Día Nacional del Abogado) on Mendoza's birth date of 23 June.

== Early life and education ==
José Cristóbal Hurtado de Mendoza y Montilla was born in the Trujillo city and area of Venezuela on 23 June 1772 to his parents Luis Bernardo Hurtado de Mendoza y Valera and Gertrudis Eulalia Montilla y Briceño. He was educated by his father in a Franciscan Monastery under the tutelage of Friar Antonio de Pereira. At the age of 16, he was sent to Caracas to complete his education at the university, where he earned a Bachelor of Arts degree in philosophy in 1791. He studied for his master's degree at the university until 1793. He afterwards began attending university in Santo Domingo in the Dominican Republic, where in 1794 obtained his doctorate degree in both canonical rights and civil rights, becoming a doctor utriusque juris (Doctor of Canon and Civil Law).

After obtaining his doctorate, Mendoza returned to Venezuela in his early twenties to begin working in his hometown. He first worked in the law office of Antonio Nicolás Briceño in Trujillo, and in the city of Mérida in 1795 he practiced law with Juan Marimón y Henríquez e Hipólito Elías González. In 1795 he briefly taught as a professor of philosophy at the seminary college of San Buenaventura de Mérida. Mendoza eventually moved to Caracas to finish his academic and vocational training in law, and he had the lawyer title conferred to him by the Real Audiencia of Caracas on 10 July 1796. He moved to Barinas in late 1796 and continued to practice law.

== Political career ==
=== 1807–1809: Governor of Barinas and Congress ===
After obtaining his law degree, Mendoza moved to Barinas, where he became known for defending local tribal groups and helping invest their profits in several agricultural properties. In January 1807, he was elected Mayor of Barinas by the Council of Barinas. After charges of nepotism in the election process that had led to Mendoza's appointment, the royal court ruled in favor of Mendoza retaining the governorship in 1808. On 19 April 1810, Mendoza joined the insurgent movement started by the Caracas elite against the Spanish crown. In May 1810, he was elected the secretary of the newly created Board of Local Government of Barinas, and he also led a movement among Caracas' wealthy citizens with the slogan "Peace and tranquility are our desires. Die or be free is our currency." Both Mendoza and his brother Luis Ignacio Mendoza were among those elected to represent the province of Barinas when the Constituent Congress of Venezuela was founded on 2 March 2011. Mendoza was not given the opportunity serve in the congress, however, before he was informed he had been appointed as president of the First Republic of Venezuela as of 5 March 1811. At the time of being appointed to president, he had been preparing to travel to Caracas while also fulfilling his duties with the newly formed Board of Governors.

=== 1811–1812: President of Venezuela ===
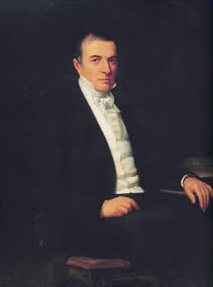
Official portrait of Cristóbal Mendoza by Martín Tovar y Tovar.

In March 1811 during the Spanish American wars of independence, the first Venezuelan constitutional congress established as the executive power a triumvirate in which three men shared executive power and rotated the presidency every week. At age 39, Mendoza became a member of the triumvirate that headed the First Republic of Venezuela and was unanimously elected by the other two as the first to go in rotation on 5 March 1811. With Manuel Moreno de Mendoza serving as the interim first president in his absence, Mendoza arrived in Caracas to begin serving his first week-long term on 25 April 1811. As part of the triumvirate, Mendoza began the war for independence against the parts of Venezuela that still supported the Spanish monarchy. He also was the author of the Venezuelan Declaration of Independence, issued on 5 July 1811. While in office he formed part of the constitutional convention that designed and promulgated the first Constitution of the Republic of Venezuela in December 1811. In March 1812, a second presidential triumvirate was appointed, with Mendoza, Juan Escalona and Baltazar Padron resigning and Fernando Toro, Francisco Javier Ustáriz and Francisco Espejo taking power.

=== 1813–1820: Governor of Mérida and Caracas ===
The First Republic fell following a royalist invasion led by Captain Domingo de Monteverde in 1813. After that, Mendoza moved to the island of Grenada. He joined the cause of Brigadier Simón Bolívar, becoming Bolivar's aide as Bolivar was preparing to fight the Spanish for the liberation of Venezuela. Bolivar appointed Mendoza the governor of Mérida, a city that had joined Bolivar's cause that May, with Mendoza entering the city on 23 May 1813. Mendoza also became governor of the province of Mérida. During the War to the Death initiated by Bolivar in Trujillo on 15 June 1813, Mendoza served multiple functions, including "political administration, taxes, provisions, stores and changing rooms for the army, hospitals, civic patrolling and surveillance of spies."

Bolívar appointed Mendoza governor of the province of Caracas, with Mendoza making his entrance into the city of Caracas on 6 August 1813. In Caracas, Mendoza formally proposed holding the Open Meeting held on 14 October 1813 where Bolivar was granted the title Liberator. A popular assembly on 2 January 1814 ratified Bolivar as the supreme commander of the Liberation Army (Ejército Libertador) fighting for independence from Spanish rule. In July 1814, the forces of José Tomás Boves conquered Caracas. Mendoza and his family escaped and went into exile, and after touring a number of islands in the West Indies, moved to Trinidad. Between 1819 and 1820, while in Trinidad Mendoza supported the cause of the Republic of Venezuela by writing newspaper articles under the pseudonym "a patriot" for the Correo del Orinoco. Under that pseudonym he also published articles on both civic and international political issues, in particular arguing against efforts to found monarchies in the Americas.

=== 1821–1826: Justice Minister and private practice ===
After the Battle of Carabobo assured Venezuelan independence in June 1821, Mendoza returned to Caracas with his family in late 1821. He was designated Justice Minister of Gran Colombia (now Venezuela), a title which can also be translated president of the Superior Court of Justice of the department of Venezuela (Corte Superior de Justicia del departamento de Venezuela). While in this role, Mendoza continued to study law and history, while also editing El Observador Caraqueño along with Francisco Javier Yanes. Mendoza resigned from his role as Justice Minister in 1825 and again went into private practice, his firm meeting with mixed success. He dedicated himself to civic projects as well, for example promoting the construction of a highway between La Guaira and Caracas as an alternative to the railway, although the project failed to materialize. Although not a candidate, he was the most voted person to serve as the vice president of the Department of Venezuela (Vicepresidencia del Departamento de Venezuela) in 1825. In 1826, he and Francisco Javier Yánez published the first major study of Bolivar and his time, with the first edition entitled Collection of documents relating to the public life of the Liberator of Colombia and Peru, Simón Bolívar. Mendoza published 22 volumes overall.

=== 1826–1828: Mayor of the Department of Venezuela ===
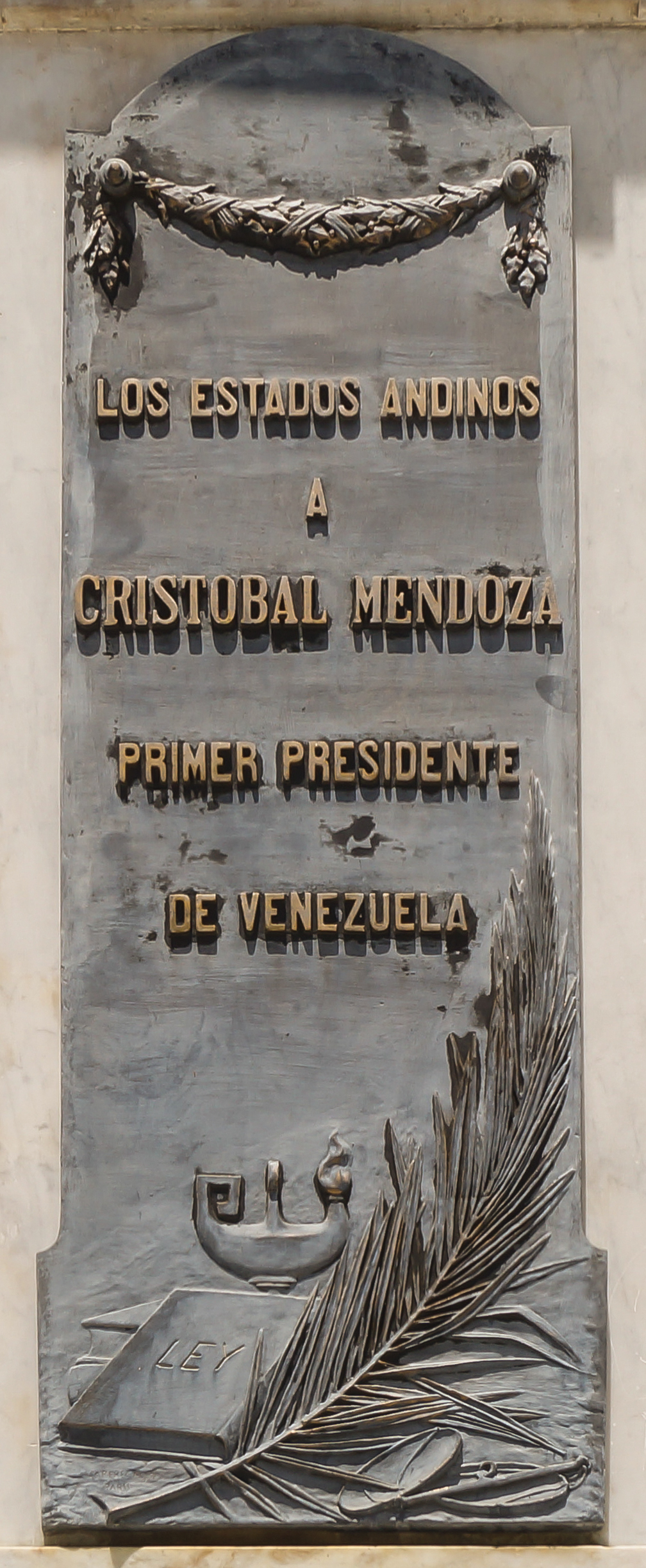
Plaque to Cristóbal Mendoza in his birthplace of Trujillo

In April 1826, under the will of Gran Colombia Vice President Francisco de Paula Santander, Mendoza was appointed Mayor of the Department of Venezuela (Intendente del Departamento de Venezuela). His appointment occurred during the time of El Cosiata, a separatist movement founded by José Antonio Páez that was opposed to Bolivar's unification movement in South America. While in his new position, Mendoza tried and failed to quell tensions between opposing parties in Venezuela, in an effort to avoid more conflict and civil war. He also failed in convincing Caracas not to join the insurrection plan aimed at dissolving Bolivar's Gran Colombia. Mendoza was exiled from Venezuela by General José Antonio Páez, and fled to the island of Saint Thomas on 27 November 1826, with his family remaining in Caracas. Bolivar returned to Caracas at the end of 1826, and peace was restored in the city by January 1827.

After Bolivar again secured power in Caracas and conflict between the factions abated, Bolivar invited Mendoza to return to Venezuela. Bolivar appointed Mendoza Mayor of the Department of Venezuela, a role Medoza kept until resigning in the middle of 1828. According to essayist Luis Britto García, Mendoza's resignation was potentially motivated by new tax measures, with Britto writing "The mere announcement of rigorous tax measures strikes fear into the hearts of civil servants like the Intendant Cristóbal Mendoza, who suddenly tendered his resignation."

== Death ==
With ailing health, in the middle of 1828 he resigned from his post as intendant, retiring to the outskirts of Caracas. On his deathbed, he wrote his political will in a letter to Bolívar where he stated his possessions as being "the remembrance of my weak services for the republic and the memories of our lifelong friendship." Cristóbal Mendoza died in Caracas on 8 February 1829. Mendoza's funeral took place on 9 February 1829 in the Church of San Pablo (now Santa Teresa). He was initially buried in the "Brothers of San Pedro" (Corner of Canons). Years later, he was buried in the Church of Altagracia (Iglesia de Altagracia). In October 2014, a legislator of the Legislative Council of Trujillo state proposed that Mendoza's remains be moved to the National Pantheon of Venezuela as a national hero.

== Views and legacy ==
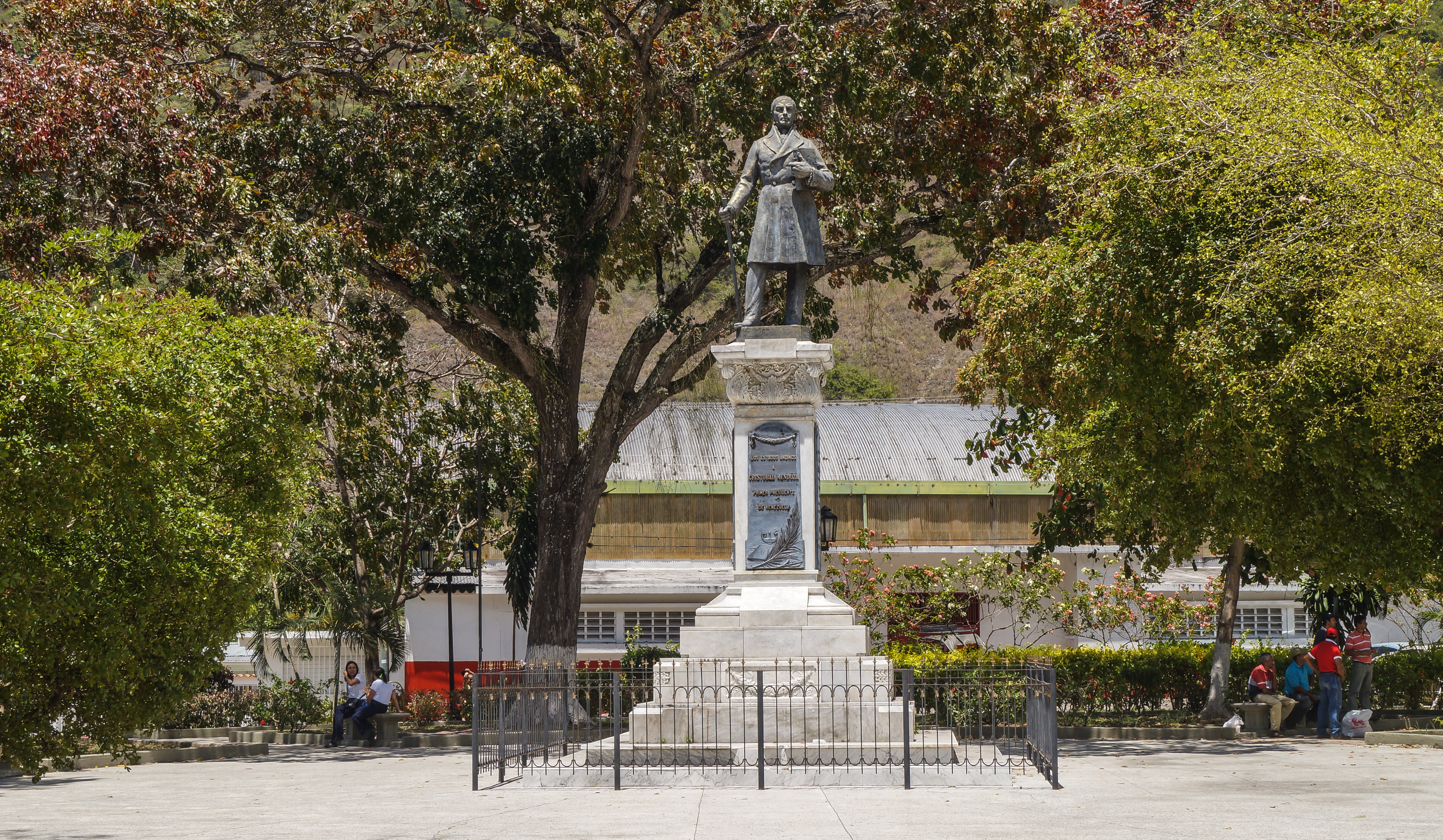
Plaza Cristóbal Mendoza in Trujillo, showcasing a statue of Mendoza.

Cristóbal Mendoza supported a federation of Latin American republics. He opposed the separatist efforts of José Antonio Páez, and according to the publication Entorno Inteligente, the triumvirate presidential model Mendoza helped initiate in 1811 was "bitterly criticized by Simón Bolívar in his Cartagena Manifesto, [with the model reflecting an] ideology of liberal constitutionalism which prevailed in the United States...."

Mendoza was a loyal and trusted advisor to Simón Bolívar, and he collected documents on Bolivar's public life, publishing 20 small volumes of the documents between 1824 and 1828. Bolivar purportedly stated about Mendoza that "you are the man I admire most in this world, because you carry and retain the model of virtue and helpful goodness."

In 1972, Venezuela enacted National Lawyer Day (Día Nacional del Abogado) on Mendoza's birth date of 23 June in commemoration of Mendoza. The holiday was enacted by president Rafael Caldera at the request of the Federation of Associations of Venezuela (Federación de Colegios de Abogados de Venezuela).

== Personal life ==
Mendoza moved to Barinas from Caracas in late 1796, where he married Juana Mendez Mendoza Briceño. He was widowed shortly after, and in the early nineteenth century, he remarried Maria Regina Montilla of Pumar, a relation of Jose Ignacio of Pumar. He had been widowed a second time by 1810. On 14 August 1811, Mendoza married for the third time to Gertrudis Buroz Tovar. Mendoza procreated 17 children.

Two of his grandsons emigrated to Cuba under Spanish rule and fought for the independence of the island during the Ten Years' War (1868–1878). Cristóbal Mendoza Durán, who worked as journalist in Camagüey, later joined the Liberating Army and Carlos Manuel de Céspedes, in appreciation of his intellectual and moral values, appointed him Foreign Secretary of the first government of the Republic of Cuba in Arms. His brother Tomás, who was also a journalist and who in the ranks mambises acted as assistant secretary of General Manuel de Quesada. Both Cristóbal and Tomás Mendoza gave their lives on the battlefields of Cuba.

Other descendants of Cristóbal Mendoza include Eugenio Mendoza, Eduardo Mendoza Goiticoa, Lorenzo Mendoza and Leopoldo López.

== See also ==
- List of presidents of Venezuela
- List of Venezuelans
- Elections in Venezuela
- Politics of Venezuela

Political offices
Preceded by New creation	President of Venezuela; 5 March 1811 – 21 March 1812	Succeeded by Francisco Espejo
