= Fernando Miyares =

Fernando Miyares Pérez y Bernal (sometimes, Fernando Miyares y Gonzáles) (Santiago de Cuba, East province, Cuba, Spanish Empire, 4 February 1749 – Santiago de Cuba, East province, Cuba, Spanish Empire, 13 October 1818) was a Cuban Captain General, born in Santiago de Cuba, in 1749.

== Biography ==
Born in Cuba as son of Fernando Miyares Laizaga and Úrsula Pérez y Bernal, he was to become one of the few Criollo governors of Venezuela. In May 1764, he served as a cadet in the Havana Infantry Regiment. He was sent to Spain for three years of military training in Toledo. In 1772, he was assigned to Puerto Rico.

In June 1777, the Captain General of Venezuela, Luis de Unzaga, summoned him to serve as his secretary. He arrived with his wife, Inés Mancebo y Quiroga, and rose to the rank of lieutenant colonel. In 1786, with the creation of the Barinas Province, he was appointed its military and political commander, governing for twelve intense years. During this time, he founded primary schools and a higher education institution.

In 1788, he founded San Fernando de Apure. He promoted agriculture and established infrastructure for trade; he encouraged the cultivation of indigo and increased the production of coffee and cotton.
On 25 June 1798, he assumed the political and military governorship of the Maracaibo Province, where he remained until 1810. He learned of the Revolution in Caracas (19 April 1810) from the Santa Ana de Coro City Council. He convened a council of notables, who swore allegiance to the Spanish regency.

Unaware that Vicente Emparán had been deposed by the municipal council of Caracas, the Spanish Council of Regency appointed Miyares as his replacement as Capitan General of Venezuela on 29 April 1810. Upon receiving official notice of his new assignment, he began to organize efforts to defend Coro from military expeditions sent by the Junta of Caracas.

In 1812 Frigate Captain Domingo de Monteverde arrived in Venezuela with a small force of marines. He was assigned to aid an anti-republican uprising in small towns near Coro, but managed to continue pushing deep into republican territory and enlarge his forces with locals dissatisfied with the Republic. After gaining military strength, Monteverde refused to recognize Miyares's authority and established himself as interim captain general of the reconquered areas, something which was ratified by the Cortes of Cádiz – which served as a parliamentary Regency after Ferdinand VII was deposed – when it temporarily split Venezuela into two captaincies general. Because Miyares was born in the Americas, he was suspected of being "lukewarm in his loyalty to the King."

In 1814 Miyares was offered the Captaincy General of Guatemala, but it seems he never assumed the post since José de Bustamante y Guerra was in office during these years.

He died in his home town, Santiago de Cuba, East province, Captaincy General of Cuba, Spanish Empire, in 1818.

== See also ==
- Royalist (Spanish American Revolutions)

Military offices
Preceded by Vicente Emparán	Capitan General of Venezuela; 1810–1812	Succeeded by Juan Domingo de Monteverde
Preceded by Position created by the Cortes of Cádiz; Fernando Miyares y Gonzales as Capitan General of Venezuela	Capitan General of Maracaibo; 1812–1814	Succeeded by Position abolished by Ferdinand VII; Juan Manuel Cajigal as Capitan General of Venezuela
Preceded by José de Bustamante y Guerra	Capitan General of Guatemala; Never assumed office	Succeeded by José de Bustamante y Guerra
