= Treaty of Armistice and Regularization of the War =

Pair of treaties between Spain and Colombia

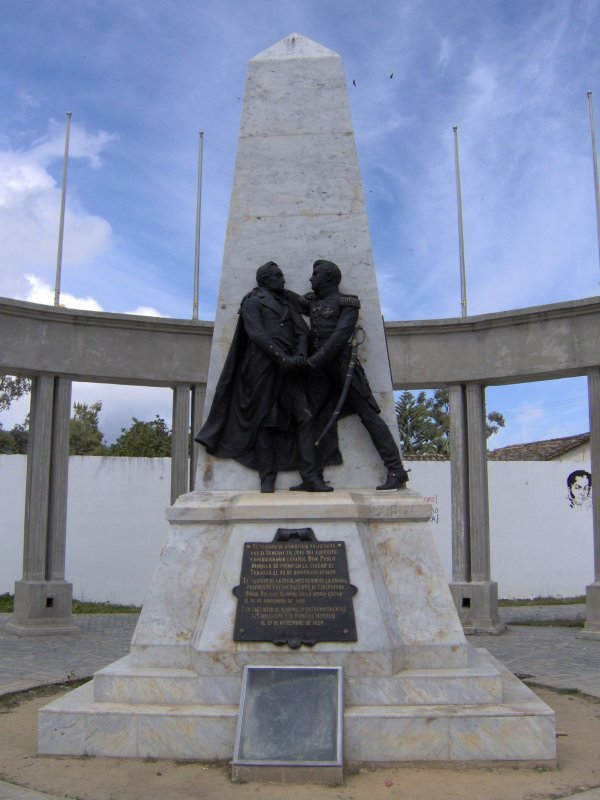
- A monument in Santa Ana de Trujillo showing the embrace between Simón Bolívar and Pablo Morillo
- Type: Armistice, protocol
- Context: Colombian War of Independence
- Drafted: November 24 and 26, 1820, respectively
- Signed: November 27, 1820
- Location: Santa Ana de Trujillo
- Expiry: Armistice ended April 28, 1821
- Parties: Gran Colombia; Spanish Empire
- Language: Spanish

The Treaty of Armistice and Regularization of the War refers to a pair of treaties signed in Trujillo between Spain and Gran Colombia including an armistice, sometimes called the Armistice of Trujillo, and the Treaty of the Regularization of the War. Respectively, the treaties paused the Colombian War of Independence and established rules of war for both sides, ending the War to the Death, which had been decreed in 1813 in Trujillo.

== Background ==
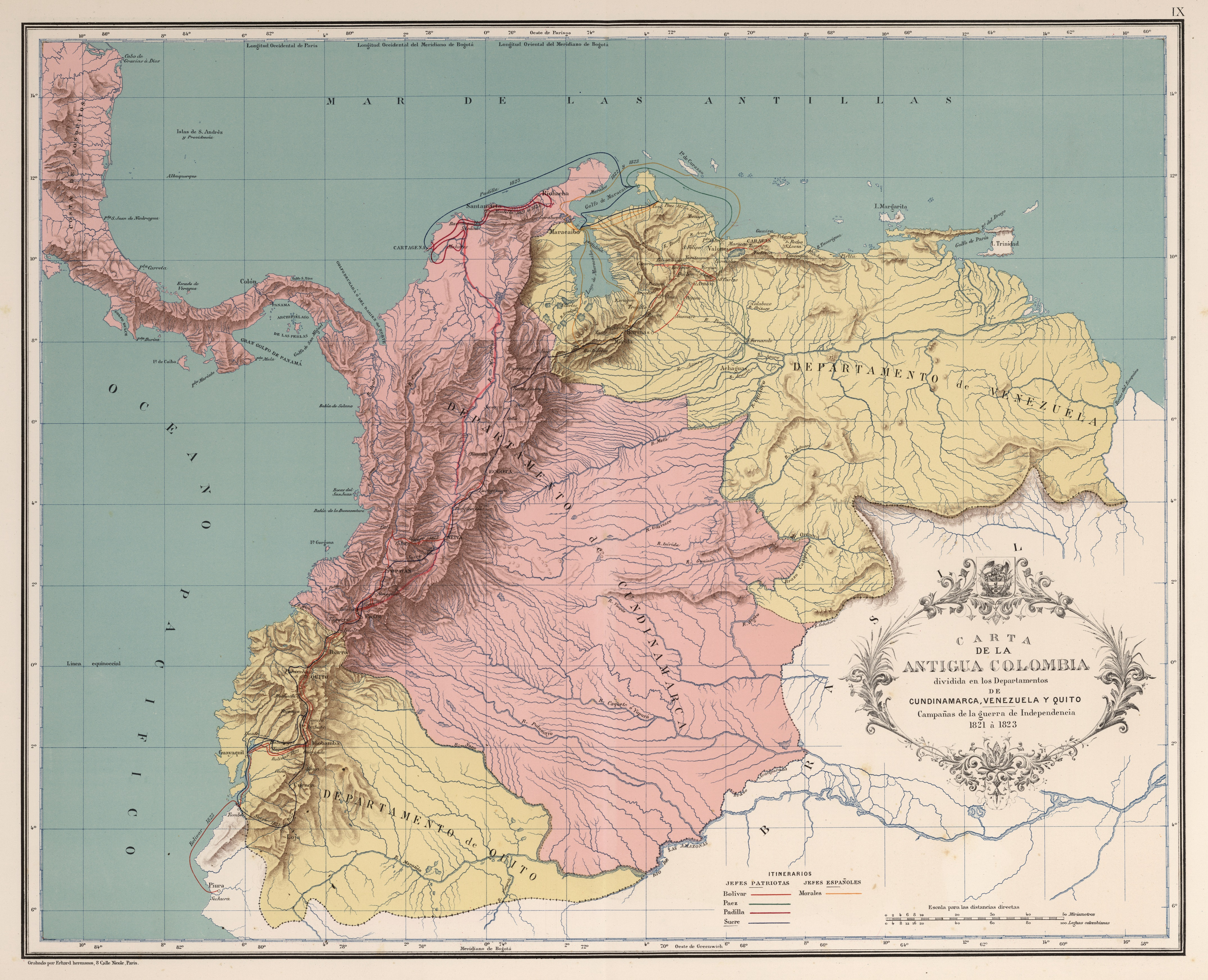
Gran Colombia 1821-1823

In 1819, Simón Bolívar's Patriot forces were established in parts of northern South America, with ambition to take Quito and Caracas. Bolívar worried his forces were too weak to take the rest of Venezuela, but too vulnerable to focus on Quito, because of the risk posed by Spanish forces in coastal Colombia and Venezuela.

Meanwhile, in Spain, the next expeditionary force bound for the Americas waited for transport from Cádiz. On 1 January 1820, some of those forces revolted. A revolution spread across Spain, and a liberal government using the 1812 Constitution was installed. The liberal government took a comparatively softer foreign policy than their predecessor. In May 1820, Pablo Morillo received instructions from Spain to seek a peace with the Colombians and to get them to accept the 1812 Constitution, hopeful that it could end the war. Morillo was himself displeased with the constitution for limiting his power by separating military and civil affairs, but he nevertheless promulgated it in Caracas in June. That month, Ferdinand VII ordered Morillo to free some prisoners as a sign of goodwill, and early negotiations began that month.

== Negotiations ==
=== Preliminary ===
Preliminary negotiations began when Morillo wrote to the Congress of Angostura under Ferdinand VII's orders. The two sides established a correspondence, and that July, Miguel de la Torre worked out a ceasefire in Cúcuta valley for one month. Meanwhile, the 1812 Constitution was causing mass Royalist desertions and straining the supply situation. Bolívar assessed that Spain was desperate for peace, so that October he advanced further into newly weakened Venezuela to consolidate his position, taking Trujillo and Mérida while Mariano Montilla advanced along the Magdelana river. Then, Bolívar sought out an armistice. Morillo desperately wanted to return to his home of Spain for reasons including his unconsummated proxy marriage, but was not allowed to leave until he had worked out a peace, so he agreed to opening negotiations with Bolívar.

=== In Trujillo ===
The two sides met in Trujillo on 22 November. The Colombian side was composed of commissioners Antonio José de Sucre, José Gabriel Pérez, and Pedro Briceño Méndez, and the Royalist side was composed of commissioners Juan Rodríguez del Toro, Ramón Correa, and Francisco González de Linares. The Spanish proposed a commonwealth with Spain, but this was not accepted. The Colombians proposed independence, but Morillo lacked the power to give them that. The document they produced on 24 November was a fifteen article armistice, which was authorized by Morillo that same day, and by Bolívar the next day. Article 14 of the armistice promised a follow-up treaty on war conduct, which the Colombians proposed on 26 November. Small changes were made to it before it was signed by the commissioners.

=== Bolívar and Morillo's meeting ===
Morillo invited Bolívar to Santa Ana de Trujillo, where they signed the treaties on 27 November. Morillo had arrived with fifty field officers and a squadron of hussars and watched Bolívar as he arrived by himself, riding a donkey. When Bolívar dismounted, he and Morillo embraced. Morillo suggested a monument be erected on that spot, and a boulder was immediately moved to mark the spot. Then, they dined.

== Content ==
The armistice was to last for six months, during which offensive actions on land and sea would be ended, the areas of occupation up to that moment were to be held static, the Colombians were granted the right to sail directly to Spain for peace, and another treaty was provided to regulate the conduct of war according to the laws of the nations. The armistice provided for its early termination to occur after a 40 day notice, as well as its extension. The second treaty consisted of twelve articles and provided the guerrillas the same rights as normal soldiers, required burial or burning of the dead, allowed for the exchange of prisoners, required caring for the sick and wounded of captured settlements, prohibited persecuting residents of captured settlements for their beliefs, prohibited the shooting of prisoners, including defecting Royalists, and promised "Christian care" to prisoners.

== The armistice ==
Although Bolívar sent notification of the armistice to forces active everywhere, he suggested delaying the message to Ecuador and contriving a false excuse to explain why the message was delayed so that he could have a better position there, although his general there was defeated at Genoy in February.

Bolívar considered the armistice to be in favor of the Colombians, as it allowed Colombia to carefully prepare for renewed hostilities while the Spanish position continued to gradually deteriorate. In Colombia, deliberations began in January on what would become the Constitution of Cúcuta. Morillo, before being succeeded by De la Torre, advised the Spanish government to either send reinforcements or accept the proposals of the revolutionaries.

In 1821, Gran Colombia sent envoys, José Rafael Revenga and José Echeverría, to Spain to negotiate for independence. They were expelled in August 1821 because of the end of the armistice.

=== The armistice ends ===
In January 1821, Francisco Delgado, Royalist administrator of Maracaibo, declared the independence of the city, placing it under the Patriots, so that it could resume trade in Colombian markets. De la Torre, considered the events in the city an illegal gain for the Colombians, though Rafael Urdaneta reminded him it was a defection from the Royalist side. Bolívar suggested placing it under arbitration because such a circumstance had not been provided for in the armistice before, having determined that Spain was unwilling to recognize Colombian independence, invoking the forty day period before the termination of the armistice. This went through on 28 April.

By the end of the armistice Bolívar had given orders to his generals, sending Urdaneta to take Coro and Guanare, José Antonio Páez to Mijagual, and José Francisco Bermúdez towards Caracas.

== Legal analysis ==
Jesús María Yepes believed that the Treaty of the Regularization of the War was one of the first, if not the first, to apply the rules of war to an ongoing conflict. Yepes found influence of the treaty in the 1856 Treaty of Paris, 1907 Hague Convention, and later humanitarian proposals from Latin American countries. The treaty is a regulatory rather than normative one, stabilizing the norms being undertaken on both sides and prohibiting the brief and violent breaches of this conduct. Its enactment was part of the process of reducing the violence of the war.

The significance of the treaty was implicit acknowledgment of the Colombians as a legitimate force, if not of legality, but of existence. The Treaty of the Regularization of the War explicitly recognized Bolívar as leader of Colombia.
