= Revolution of April 19, 1810 =

Insurrection in Caracas, Venezuela

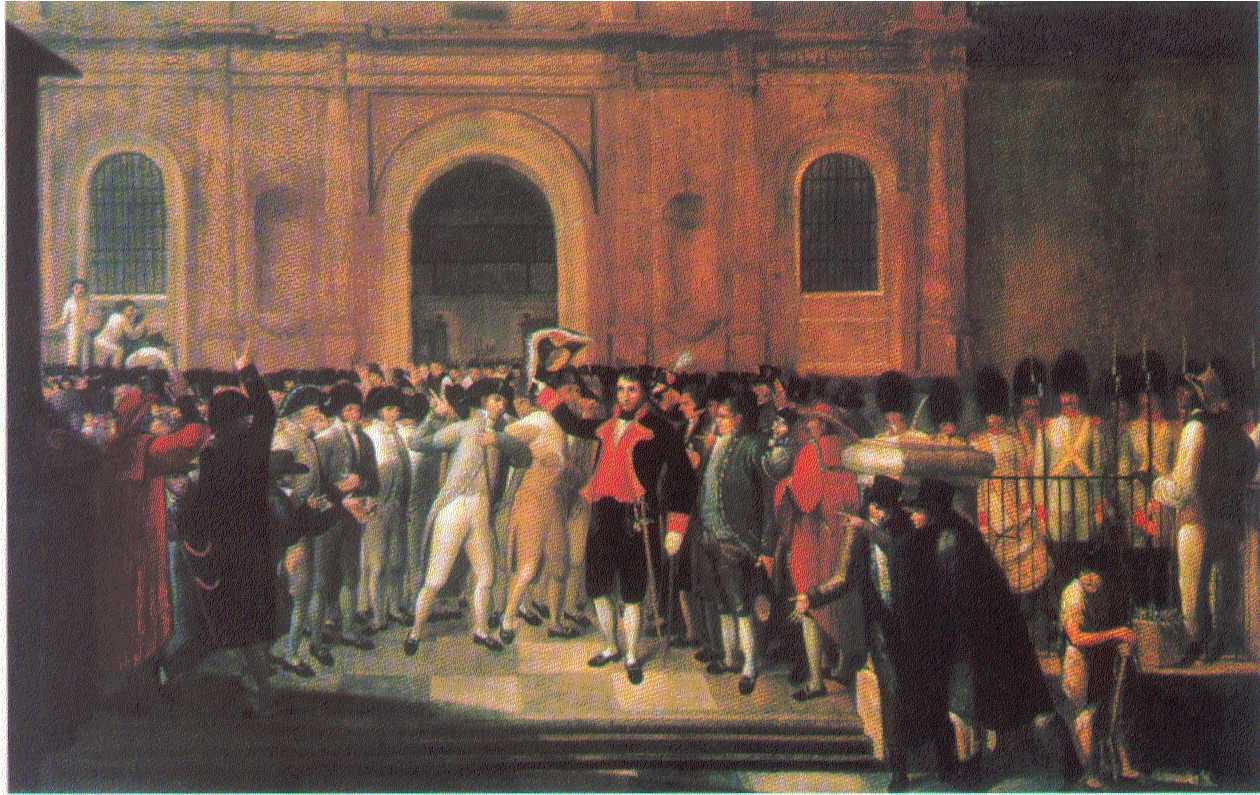
- The 19th of April, 1810, by Juan Lovera.
- Date: April 19, 1810
- Location: Caracas, Captaincy General of Venezuela
- Participants: City dwellers in general and the cabildo
- Outcome: Formation of the Supreme Junta of Caracas, Venezuela's first form of self-government, and Venezuela's Independence Movement Begins

The Revolution of April 19, 1810, was an insurrection in Caracas on April 19, 1810, that deposed Vicente Emparan, captain general of Venezuela, and founded the Supreme Junta of Caracas, Venezuela's first form of self-government. It is conventionally noted as the beginning of the country's struggle for independence.

In 1808, the Spanish King Ferdinand VII was forced to abdicate and imprisoned by Napoleon Bonaparte. The Spanish population reacted, leading to the creation of the Supreme Central Junta, which declared itself the substitute for Ferdinand VII until his return. The colonies of Spanish America submitted to this junta.

However, the fall of the junta led the cabildo of Caracas to meet and establish a local junta. Vicente Emparan resisted accepting it and was thus ousted by the junta with other royal officials on April 19, 1810. The junta gained the support of most of the other provinces of Venezuela and convened a Congress on March 3, 1811, which decided to declare Venezuela's independence on July 5, forming the First Republic of Venezuela.

== Background ==
=== Precedents ===
Throughout the 18th century, there were several movements of dissatisfaction among the population of present-day Venezuela with the Spanish administration. Although more motivated by economic and social than political causes, they contributed to the development of a national sentiment opposed to Spanish rule. Of these movements, the Rebellion of Andresote (1730–1733), the Rebellion of San Felipe (1741), the Rebellion of El Tocuyo (1744), the Insurrection of Juan Francisco de León (1749–1751), and the Revolt of the Comuneros (1781) stand out.

In addition, there were movements between the end of the 18th and the beginning of the 19th century for political change. These are the movements of José Leonardo Chirino and José Caridad González (1795), the conspiracy of Gual and España (1797), the attempt of Francisco Javier Pirela (1799), and the invasions of Francisco de Miranda (1806).

=== Formation of the Supreme Central Board ===
In 1808, Spain was undergoing a political crisis. Napoleon took advantage of the crisis and forced the Spanish king, Ferdinand VII, and his father, Charles IV, to abdicate. The deposed king and his father were imprisoned and Napoleon's older brother, Joseph Bonaparte, assumed the Spanish throne with the title Joseph I. Consequently, the Spanish people formed several governing juntas that declared themselves loyal to Ferdinand VII and organized to resist the French monarch militarily. On September 25, the juntas unified into the Supreme Central Junta, which manifested itself as Fernando VII's substitute until his return. The Supreme Central Junta was recognized as a legitimate authority by both Joseph I's opponents in Spain and Spanish America, despite attempts in the colonies to establish autonomous governing juntas, such as the Mantuanos Conspiration (1808) in Caracas.

== The revolution ==
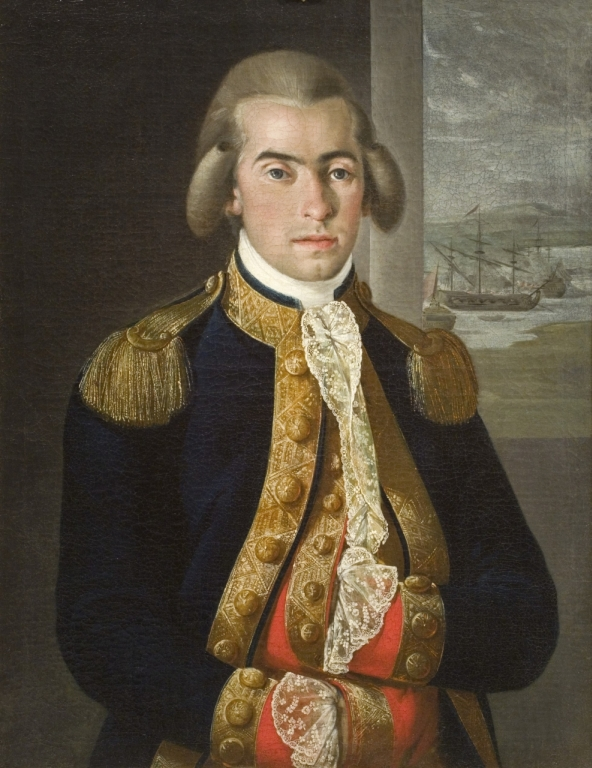
Vicente Emparan, captain general of Venezuela, deposed by the revolution.

Between December 1809 and the first months of 1810, unrest in Caracas, existing since 1808, intensified with rumors that Spain had been dominated by the French. On April 17, 1810, news officially reached the city that Seville had been conquered by the French and that the Supreme Central Junta had dissolved itself and been replaced by a Council of Regency. On the evening of the next day, the cabildo (composed mostly of mantuanos, that is, members of the local Criollo elite) called an extraordinary meeting to discuss the situation in the metropolis with the captain general of Venezuela, Vicente Emparan.

The meeting took place at the headquarters of the cabildo on the morning of April 19, a Holy Thursday. The resulting proposal was that a local governing council needed to be formed in light of the situation on the Peninsula. Emparan refused the proposal and left the meeting arguing that he needed to attend the religious ceremonies of the day. However, Emparan was prevented from entering the temple by a nearby crowd and threatened to continue with the meeting. Back at the cabildo headquarters, Emparan continued the debate, which went on for several more hours. As time passed, the position of the members, of the captain general, and that of the revolutionaries became increasingly incompatible.

Hoping to solve the problem, Emparan went to the balcony and asked the people if they were happy with him and wished him to follow the mandate. There was a moment of indecision, which was broken when Canon Jose Cortes de Madariaga, who was behind Emparan, made a vigorous negative sign to the crowd, which was followed by the regidors Nicolas Anzola and Dionisio Palacios, also behind the captain general, provoking a resounding "no" from the people. In this way, Emparan exclaimed that he did not want the mandate either.

On the same day, minutes were drawn up recording the deposition of Emparan and other royal officials and the formation of the new government (the Supreme Conservative Junta of the Rights of Ferdinand VII, also known as the Supreme Junta of Caracas), Venezuela's first form of self-government. The minutes were signed by all those attending the meeting, including the deposed, who were soon thereafter driven to La Guaira and imprisoned in the fortresses or confined aboard anchored ships until they were expelled.

On April 20, the two alcalde-presidents José de las Llamozas and Martín Tovar Ponte sent a proclamation to the other provinces of Venezuela. In this proclamation, they reported the events of the previous day in Caracas and encouraged the provinces to join the cause. All the provinces joined, except for the city of Coro (in the Caracas province) and the provinces of Maracaibo and Guayana, which declared themselves loyal to the Regency (which had also opposed it).

== Consequences ==
=== Formation of the First Republic ===
Although the official objective of the Supreme Junta of Caracas was to defend the territory from a possible French invasion, the most prominent members had the intention of making Venezuela completely independent. This was done by sending diplomatic agents to the United States and the United Kingdom, forming secretariats of state, and calling for congressional elections. In addition, the junta took other revolutionary measures, such as representation to African descendants, abolition of the slave trade (but not slavery), and freedom of the press and commerce.

On March 2, 1811, the General Congress of Venezuela was installed, replacing the Supreme Junta of Caracas. On July 5 of the same year, the Congress decided by an absolute majority of representatives (only one deputy opposed) for the declaration of Venezuela's independence, starting the First Republic of Venezuela.

=== Legacy ===
The revolution is conventionally noted as the beginning of Venezuela's struggle for independence. In the year 1909, the National Academy of Venezuelan History produced an agreement with fourteen considerations regarding the importance of the date, concluding that the revolution "constitutes the initial, definitive, and transcendental movement of Venezuelan emancipation." In contrast, historians such as David Bushnell and Germán Carrera Damas consider it only as the culmination in Venezuela of a larger crisis that involved the entire Spanish Empire.

== See also ==
- Peninsular War
- History of Venezuela
- First Republic of Venezuela
- Venezuelan War of Independence
- Junta (Peninsular War)
- Supreme Junta
