= Onoto =

Town in Anzoátegui, Venezuela

Coordinates: 9°35′45″N 65°11′23″W

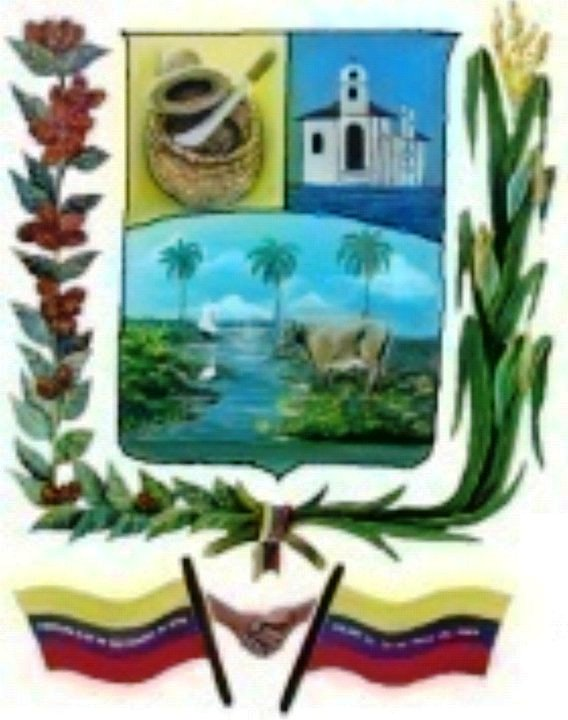
- Flag Coat of arms

- Juan Manuel Cajigal Municipality in Anzoátegui State
- Country: Venezuela
- State: Anzoátegui
- Municipality: Juan Manuel Cajigal

Government
  - Mayor: Mireya Molero Silva (PSUV)

Area
  - Total: 1,741 km^{2} (672 sq mi)

Population (2001)
  - Total: 12,358
  - Density: 7.1/km^{2} (18/sq mi)
- Time zone: UTC−4 (VET)
- Area code: 0281
- Climate: Aw
- Website: juancajigal-anzoategui.gob.ve
- The area and population figures are for the municipality

Onoto is a town in the eastern Venezuelan state of Anzoátegui. This town is the shire town of the Juan Manuel Cajigal Municipality and, according to the 2001 Venezuelan census, the municipality has a population of 12,358.

== Demographics ==
The Juan Manuel Cajigal Municipality, according to the 2001 Venezuelan census, has a population of 12,358 (down from 14,183 in 1990). This amounts to 1% of Anzoátegui's population.

== Government ==
Onoto is the shire town of the Juan Manuel Cajigal Municipality in Anzoátegui. The mayor of the Juan Manuel Cajigal Municipality is Mardo Marcano, reelected in 2004 with 32% of the vote. The last municipal election was held in October 2004.
