= Francisco Tomás Morales =

Spanish field marshal and Captain General of Venezuela

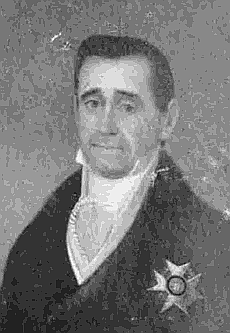
Francisco Tomas Morales

Francisco Tomás Morales (Agüimes Carrizal, Canary Islands, December 20, 1781, Las Palmas, Canary Islands, October 5, 1845), was a Spanish military officer, and the last of that country to hold the post of Captain General of Venezuela, reaching the rank of field marshal during the Venezuelan War of Independence.

As recounted in a series of letters distributed by the Philadelphia Gazette, in 1822 General Morales issued a decree widely interpreted by the American merchants then in Caracas, La Guaira, and Puerto Cabello as a threat. The Americans solicited the help of Captain Robert T. Spence, whose frigate, the Cyane, was in the area, to delay his departure for Africa (on piracy duty) to protect them from Morales. Spence complied for several days in October 1822, much to the relief of the Americans, at least briefly.

Morales conceded defeat after the Battle of Lake Maracaibo in July 1823. Puerto Cabello, the last Royalist stronghold in Venezuela, fell to the independence forces in November 1823.

== Battles and campaigns ==
Place	Years	Event
Capitanía General de Venezuela	1813-1814	Campaigns under José Tomás Boves
Capitanía General de Venezuela	1815	1º Campaign of Margarita Island
Viceroyalty of Nueva Granada	1815	Siege of Cartagena (1815)
Capitanía General de Venezuela	1816	Destruction of 1º Haitian Expedition of los Cayos in Carúpano
Capitanía General de Venezuela	1817-1820	Campaigns under Pablo Morillo
Capitanía General de Venezuela	1821-1822	Campaigns under Miguel de la Torre
Capitanía General de Venezuela	1822-1823	Campaign of Occidente (Maracaibo)

Military offices
Preceded by Miguel de la Torre	Captain General of Venezuela Province	Succeeded by Captaincy General abolished
