= Francisco Espejo =

Venezuelan politician

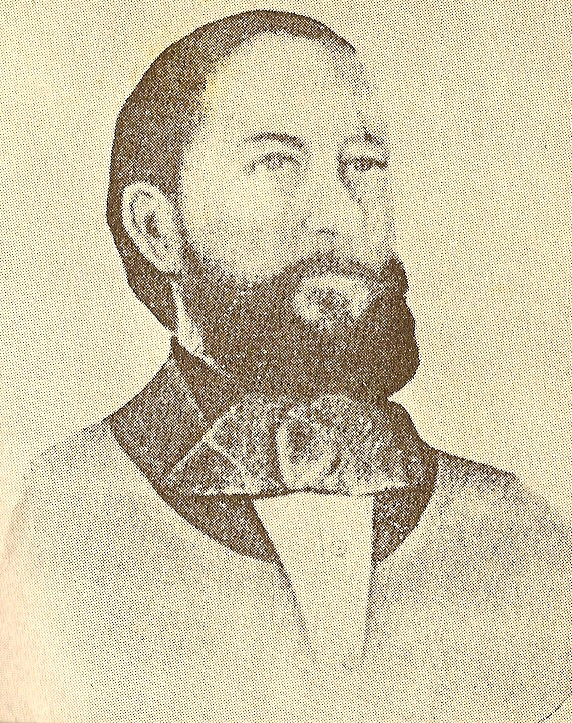

2nd President of the First Republic of Venezuela
- In office March 21, 1812 – April 3, 1812
- Preceded by: Cristobal Mendoza
- Succeeded by: Francisco de Miranda

Personal details
- Born: 16 April 1758 Siquire, Venezuela Province, Viceroyalty of New Granada, Spanish Empire (now in Miranda, Venezuela)
- Died: 15 July 1814 (aged 56) Valencia, Captaincy General of Venezuela, Spanish Empire (now in Carabobo State, Venezuela)
- Profession: Lawyer
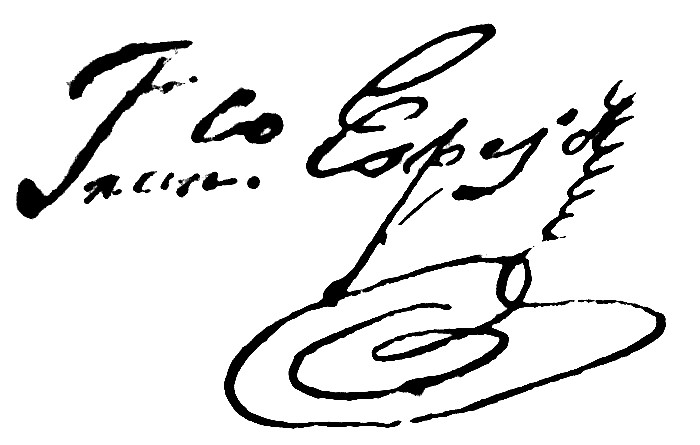
- Signature

Francisco Silvestre Espejo Camaño (Siquire, Miranda State, April 16, 1758 – Valencia, Carabobo State, July 15, 1814), was a Venezuelan lawyer who briefly served as the President of Venezuela in 1812 and fought for the republican cause during the Venezuelan War of Independence. His parents were Francisco Espejo and Bárbara Caamaño y Bermúdez.

He was executed by firing squad in 1814.
