= Diego de Mazariegos Guadalfajara =

Diego de Mazariegos Guadalfajara was colonial governor of Cuba from 1556 to 1565 and colonial governor of Venezuela Province from 1570 to 1576.
