= Juan Manuel Cajigal y Odoardo =

Venezuelan mathematician and politician

Juan Manuel Cajigal y Odoardo (1803 in Barcelona, Anzoátegui – 1856 in Yaguaraparo, Sucre) was a Venezuelan mathematician, engineer and statesman.

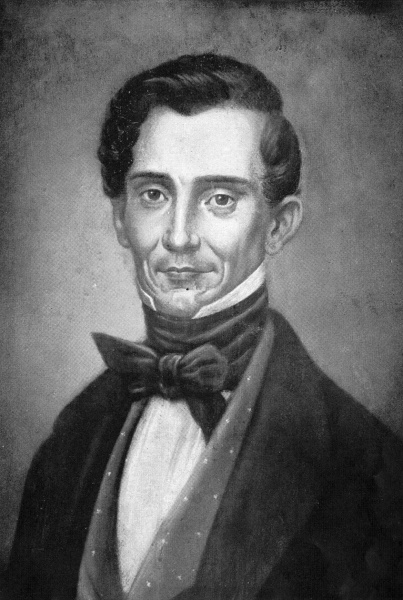
Portrait of Juan Manuel Cajigal y Odorado

Orphaned at age 7, he was raised in Spain by his cousin-once-removed, Field Marshal Juan Manuel Cajigal, former captain general of Venezuela and Cuba. He studied in the University of Alcalá de Henares and later in France, finishing his studies in 1828. He returned to Venezuela that year. He helped found the Sociedad Económica de Amigos del País the following year, and in 1830 the government appointed him to create and direct the new Military Academy of Mathematics. He served in Congress twice, once in 1833 as representative of Caracas, and in 1835 as senator of Barcelona Province. With José Hermenegildo García and Fermín Toro he started the newspaper Correo de Caracas, which ran from 1838 to 1841. His publications include Tratado de mecánica elemental ("Treatise on Fundamental Mechanics") and Curso de astronomía y memorias sobre integrales entre límites ("Course on Astronomy and Report on Integrals between Limits").

The Juan Manuel Cajigal Naval Observatory in the 23 de Enero district of Caracas (Metro Station: Caño Amarillo), Juan Manuel Cajigal Municipality in Anzoátegui, and asteroid (minor planet) 12359 Cajigal are named after him.

== Sources ==
Nieschulz de Stockhausen, Elke. "Juan Manuel Cajigal y Odoardo," Diccionario de Historia de Venezuela. Caracas: Fundacíon Polar, 1997. ISBN 980-6397-37-1
