= Juan Manuel Cajigal Municipality =

Juan Manuel Cajigal Municipality Municipio Juan Manuel Cajigal
- Municipality
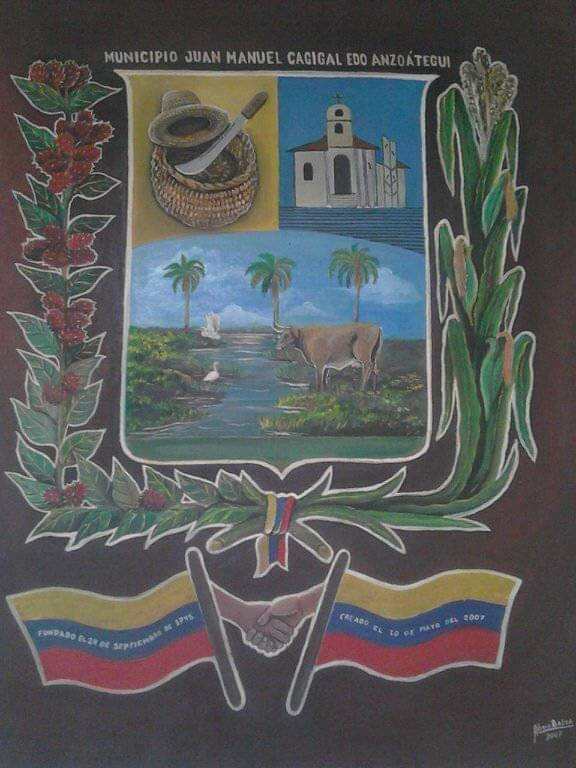
- Flag Coat of arms

- Location in Anzoátegui

- Location in Venezuela
- Coordinates: 9°37′35″N 65°18′25″W
- Country: Venezuela
- State: Anzoátegui

Government
  - Mayor: Mireya Molero Silva (PSUV)

Area
  - Total: 1,842.4 km^{2} (711.4 sq mi)

Population (2011)
  - Total: 13,476
  - Density: 7.3144/km^{2} (18.944/sq mi)
- Time zone: UTC−4 (VET)
- Area code(s): 0281

The Juan Manuel Cajigal Municipality is one of the 21 municipalities (municipios) that makes up the eastern Venezuelan state of Anzoátegui and, according to the 2011 census by the National Institute of Statistics of Venezuela, the municipality has a population of 122,634. The town of Onoto is the shire town of the Juan Manuel Cajigal Municipality. The municipality is named for the Venezuelan mathematician Juan Manuel Cajigal y Odoardo.

== Demographics ==
The Juan Manuel Cajigal Municipality, according to a 2007 population estimate by the National Institute of Statistics of Venezuela, has a population of 13,747 (up from 13,020 in 2000). This amounts to 0.9% of the state's population. The municipality's population density is 7.9 inhabitants per square kilometre (20/sq mi).

== Government ==
The mayor of the Juan Manuel Cajigal Municipality is Antonio Goffin, elected on 23 November 2008 with 48% of the vote. He replaced Mardo Marcano shortly after the elections. The municipality is divided into two parishes; Capital Onoto and San Pablo.
