= Miguel de la Torre =

Spanish army officer and governor of Puerto Rico

Miguel de la Torre y Pando
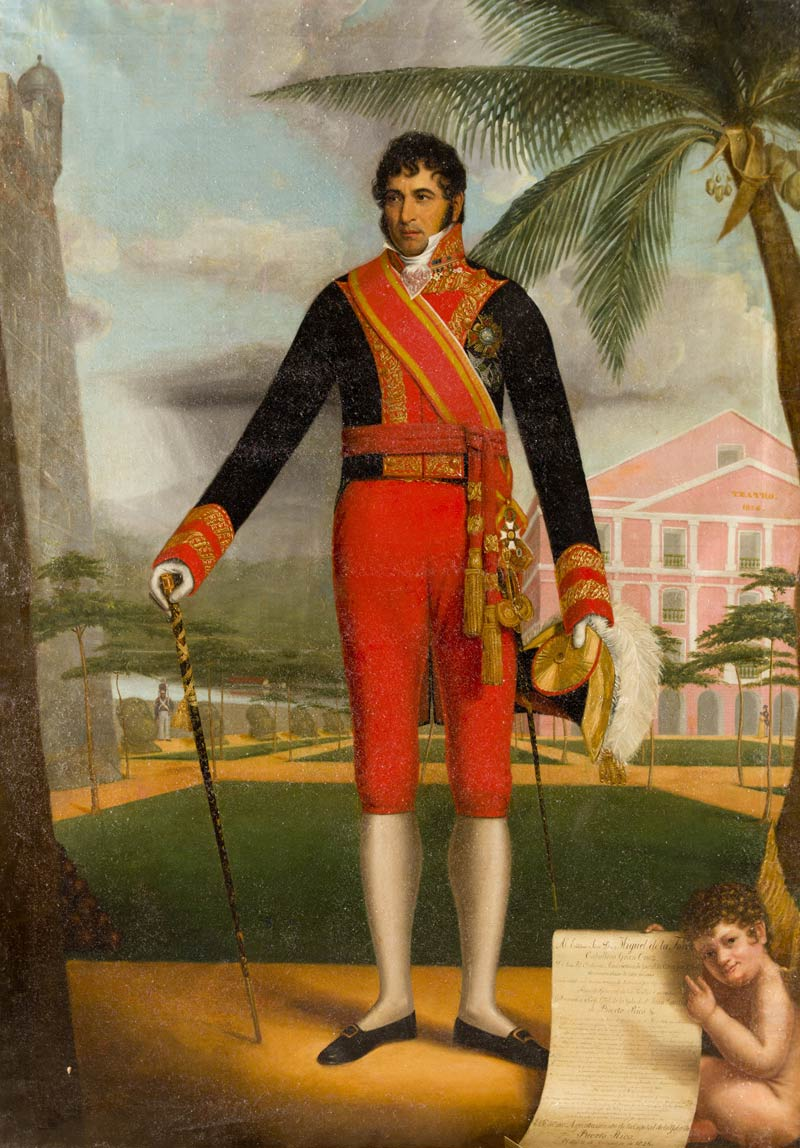
- Portrait of de la Torre by Eliab Metcalf, 1826

96th Governor of the Province of Puerto Rico
- In office 17 January 1822 – 1837

Captain General of Venezuela
- In office 1820–1822
- Preceded by: Pablo Morillo
- Succeeded by: Francisco Tomás y de Morales

Personal details
- Born: 13 December 1786 Bernales, Basque Country, Kingdom of Spain
- Died: 1843 (aged c. 56) Madrid, Spain
- Profession: General, Governor-General of Puerto Rico

Military service
- Allegiance: Kingdom of Spain
- Branch/service: Spanish Army
- Rank: General
- Commands: Expeditionary Army of Costa Firme, La Victoria Infantry Regiment
- Battles/wars: War of the Second Coalition; War of the Oranges; Peninsular War; Battle of Medellín; Battle of Ocaña; Battle of Fuentes de Oñoro; Siege of Pamplona (1813); Battle of Sorauren; Battle of Toulouse (1814); Iberian-americas rebellious separate groups; Spanish reconquest of New Granada; Siege of Cartagena; Venezuelan rebellious separate groups; Battle of Carabobo

Miguel de la Torre y Pando, 1st Count of Torre-Pando (13 December 1786 – 27 May 1843) was a Spanish general, governor and captain general, who served in Spain, Venezuela, Colombia and Puerto Rico during the Spanish American wars of independence and afterwards.

== Early career ==
Born in Bernales, at the age of fourteen he joined the Saboyard Infantry Regiment, serving during the War of the Oranges. Four years later he joined the Guardia de Corps.

=== Peninsular War ===
==== 1809 ====
He fought at the Battle of Medellín (March), where he was wounded and taken prisoner. Managing to escape, he saw action at the Battle of Ocaña (November), where he was again wounded.

==== 1810 ====
Once recovered from his wounds, he was given command of the 500 troops he had raised in Plasencia and the following October he was commissioned to raise the Castile Chasseur Battalion, bringing its number up to a thousand troops.

==== 1811 ====
Promoted to lieutenant colonel, he saw action at the Battle of Fuentes de Oñoro (May).

==== 1813 ====
He saw action at Pamplona and at Sorauren (July).

==== 1814 ====
He took part in the Battle of Toulouse (April), one of the last battles of the war.

== Venezuela and New Granada ==
After the war, he was promoted to colonel. The following year he was assigned to the Expeditionary Army of Costa Firme which participated in a military expedition to South America led by Field Marshal Pablo Morillo. Within this expeditionary army he was given command of the "La Victoria" Infantry Regiment and participated in the Spanish reconquest of New Granada.

Promoted to brigadier after New Granada was subdued, La Torre led a royalist army into the Colombian and Venezuelan Llanos. There he unsuccessfully defended Angostura against Manuel Piar in April 1817, and led the loyalist forces down the Orinoco River as they fought their way to the Atlantic Ocean. For the next three years he continued to serve in the Spanish army of Venezuela. During this period he married a Criolla, María de la Concepción Vegas y Rodríguez del Toro, a member of the powerful Rodríguez del Toro family and cousin once removed to Bolívar's late wife, Maria Teresa Rodríguez del Toro y Alayza, and fourth cousin to Bolívar himself.

After the restoration of the Spanish Constitution of 1812 in 1820, the government appointed him governor (jefe político superior) and captain-general of Venezuela, a post he held until 1822. He participated in the negotiations between Bolívar and Morillo and the later meeting in Santa Ana, where the two signed a six-month truce and a treaty regularizing the rules of engagement. After Morillo resigned and left Venezuela at the end of 1820, La Torre became the head of the royalist army, in addition to his other duties. As such he oversaw the loss suffered by royalist forces at the Battle of Carabobo on 24 June 1821, which effectively ended Spanish control of Venezuela. The following year he was replaced in his offices by Francisco Tomás Morales.

== Puerto Rico ==
In 1822, the government appointed him captain general of Puerto Rico, arriving on the island in December 1823. The following year he was also appointed governor of the island. In collaboration with his intendant, Dr. José Domingo Díaz, whom he knew from his days in Venezuela, La Torre's main concern was preventing a rebellion on the island. Carefully controlling the government, he instituted a policy which he called "dance, drink and dice" (baile, botella y baraja, similar to the Romans "bread and circuses"), implying that a well entertained population will not think about revolution. Despite La Torre's wariness of the island's liberal tendencies, his long administration was key to the development of large-scale sugar production on the island, something which had been created decades earlier in Cuba. He also continued supporting from Puerto Rico the few royalist guerrilla bands that existed in Venezuela. Under his watch, roads, homes, bridges, and Spanish fortifications were constructed.

As governor and captain general, he oversaw the temporary restoration of the Spanish Constitution of 1812 in 1836, while a new constitution was written. He was also made the Count of Torrepando for his services. The following year he retired from public life and settled in Madrid.

== Legacy ==
In Ponce, Puerto Rico, Kingdom of Spain, today colony and territory of US, there is a street, Calle Simon de la Torre (aka, Calle Torre), leading to Panteón Nacional Román Baldorioty de Castro which is named after him.

== See also ==
- Spanish reconquest of New Granada
- Reconquista (Iberian-America)
- Royalist (Spanish American Revolutions)
- Captaincy General of the Province of Puerto Rico

Government offices
Preceded by Francisco González Linares	Governor of Puerto Rico; 1822–1837	Succeeded by Francisco Javier de Moreda y Prieto
Military offices
Preceded by Pablo Morillo	Capitan General of Venezuela; 1820–1822	Succeeded by Francisco Tomás Morales
