= Juan de Casas =

Venezuelan military personnel

Juan de Casas y Barrera (born 1740) was a Spanish soldier who was the captain general of Venezuela from 1807 to 1809. He was dismissed from this role by the Supreme Central Junta, which appointed Vicente Emparán in his place. He presided over the beginnings of the Peninsular War, which put him and his governance in an unstable position.

== Life and career ==
Juan de Casas y Barrera was born in Valencia to José Couret de Casas and María de Barrera in 1740. He joined the military at a very young age and became a captain in New Spain in 1762. In 1772, he was transferred to Venezuela and fought in the Revolt of the Comuneros in 1781, during which he became a lieutenant colonel. In 1801, he married his second wife, María Josefa Blanco y Plata. He was named successor to Captain General Manuel de Guevara y Vasconcelos, who died in 1807 after an illness.

Juan de Casas succeeded Manuel de Guevara Vasconcelos as captain general in 1807. On 14 July 1808, Juan de Casas was confronted first by the French brig Serpent which wanted the captain general to accept Joseph Bonaparte as the king of Spain in place of the deposed Ferdinand VII. Andrés Bello served to translate the French reports. According to him, Juan de Casas cried when the French officers departed from him. After hearing the news, a riot formed in Caracas. They demanded that Juan de Casas form a junta and maintain the recognition of Ferdinand VII. Caracas held a city hall meeting, which ended in a pronunciation of its "fidelity and love to Our King Lord Don Fernando VII" (Spanish: fidelidad y amor al rey Nuestro Señor Don Fernando VII). When the town hall met again on 16 July, the French were captured by the British HMS Acasta. The British advised Juan de Casas to form a junta, which he finally ratified, although did not activate, on 29 July.

Juan de Casas initially left the influential Mantuano creoles out of the junta's government, but after pressure from powerful Mantuano families, he relented, promising them power once the junta activated. Meanwhile, he punished and ordered the arrests of Mantuanos who worked to assert power. His troubles with them persisted, as on 24 November, when he was presented with a document by Mantuanos who again sought a place in the governing of a junta. He began prosecuting, although unsuccessfully, those who presented the document to him.

On 24 October 1808, Juan de Casas ordered a printing press in Trinidad moved to Caracas to create the Gazeta de Caracas, a pro-government newspaper edited by Andrés Bello. He was removed as captain general by the Supreme Central Junta in 1809 and succeeded by Vicente Emparán. Juan de Casas appears as the commander of a Caracas Veteran's Battalion in 1810, after which he disappears from the record.

Military offices
Preceded by Manuel de Guevara y Vasconcelos	Capitan General of Venezuela; 1807–1810	Succeeded by Vicente Emparán
