= Manuel de Guevara y Vasconcelos =

Venezuelan military personnel

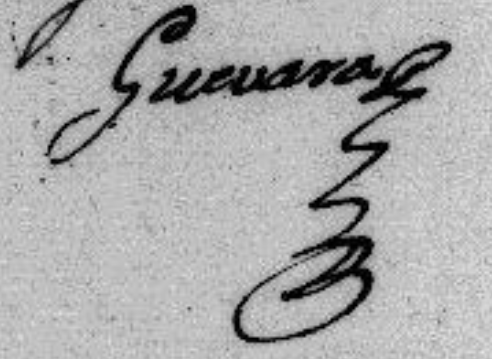
His signature

Manuel Ramón Guevara y Vasconcelos (20 July 1739 – 9 October 1807) was captain general of Venezuela from 1799 to 1807. Sent to defeat seditious elements, he executed conspirator José María España and defeated Francisco de Miranda's 1806 expedition meant to incite a revolution.

== Early life and military career ==
Manuel Ramón Guevara y Vasconcelos was born 20 July 1739 in Ceuta to José Pedro de Guevara Vasconcelos Riveiro and María del Pilar Pedrajas Medrano. He entered military service as a cadet and became an aide-de-camp of Miguel de Irumberri Balanza during the Fantastic War. By 1783 he was lieutenant colonel and a knight of the Order of Santiago.

Around 1783 he arrived in the Americas, first being in Puerto Rico, then Cartagena de Indias, then in Santa Fe de Bogotá where he worked under Antonio Caballero y Góngora and created militias in the Guayaquil area. While coordinating the response to a smallpox outbreak there he was infected. He briefly returned to Europe, then returned to Cuba, and then once more went to Europe for the War of the Pyrenees after which he was captured during the Siege of Collioure. In 1798 he was free and sent to rule as the captain general of Venezuela by royal decree on 11 October 1798, with which he was also appointed president of the Real Audiencia of Caracas.

== As captain general ==
In the wake of the Gual and España conspiracy, then-captain general Pedro Carbonell was removed and Joaquín de Zubillaga was put in as interim captain general while Guevara y Vasconcelos sailed over, eventually arriving in Caracas on 5 April 1799. The city agreed to pay to furnish his house in the city. Guevara y Vasconcelos had been sent to end sedition and rebellion in Venezuela. When conspirator José María España was caught, he arranged a tribunal with Antonio López Quintana, Francisco Ignacio Cortínes, José Bernardo de Asteguieta, Rafael Diego Mérida, and himself to judge España. Finding him guilty, they sentenced him to death. He was hanged, drawn and quartered with his head placed in a cage atop a pole in La Guaira. Despite receiving anonymous letters promising mass revolt if España was killed, the execution was performed without delay.

In 1806, Francisco de Miranda attempted an expedition to begin an uprising in Venezuela. Government spies anticipated his landing at Ocumare de la Costa and a land force was positioned along with two vessels to defeat the invasion. Fifty eight were captured and ten were later hanged, then beheaded, with the rest sentenced to prison. Miranda abandoned the expedition and fell back to Aruba while Guevara y Vasconcelos gathered a force of 8,000 in Valencia to guard against potential further attacks. He was furious that Miranda had escaped. He burned an effigy of him and raised a 30,000 peso bounty for his head.

He received Alexander von Humboldt with honors when he visited Caracas in 1799. In 1802 he authorized the printing of copper coins, the first currency minted in Caracas. During the Balmis Expedition he helped Francisco Javier de Balmis when he was in Venezuela, where a few thousand were vaccinated. Guevara y Vasconcelos was a patron of the arts and wrote literature under the pseudonym Gavilán. He appointed poet Andrés Bello as his secretary and later his second officer.

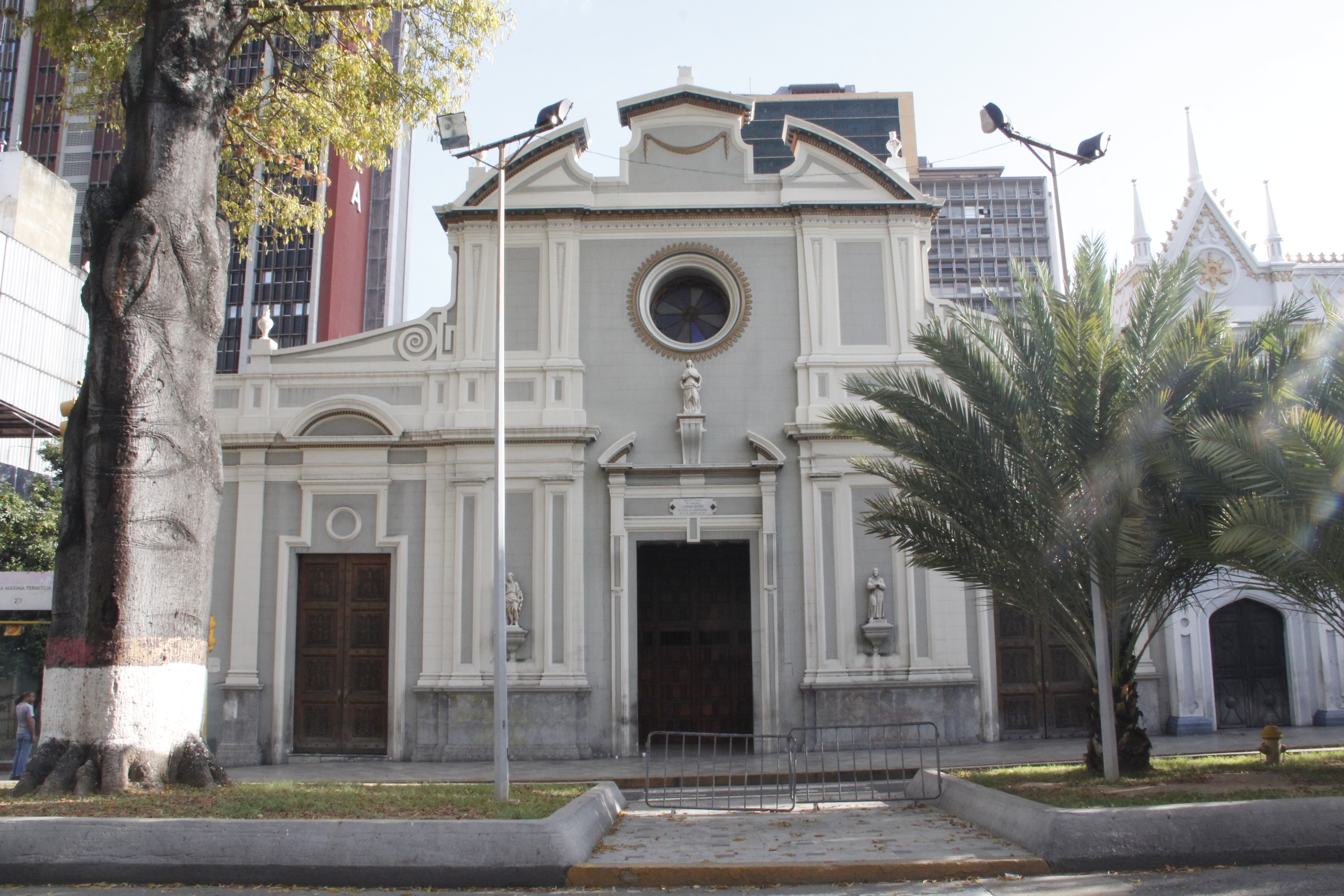
The Church of San Francisco, where Guevara y Vasconcelos is buried

In 1801 he received a report from Joaquín García y Moreno describing the Spanish surrender of Santo Domingo to Toussaint Louverture. In 1804 he wrote to Charles IV of Spain complaining about inadequate information about the Haitian takeover of Hispaniola, expressing concern about the new independent Black state, and sending him a copy of the Haitian Declaration of Independence. Charles IV wrote back advising him to better control Black Venezuelans, especially restricting the flow of ideas and to stop maritime smuggling. He had already issued a similar restrictive order in 1801.

== Death ==
On 5 October 1807, he suffered a stroke. He died on 8 October and is buried in the Church of San Francisco. His death was celebrated by Patriots, who were glad to be rid of a formidable opponent. He was succeeded by interim captain general Juan de Casas, but officially succeeded by Vicente Emparán.

Military offices
Preceded by Joaquín de Zubillaga	Capitan General of Venezuela; 1799–1807	Succeeded by Juan de Casas
