= Juan Lovera =

Venezuelan painter

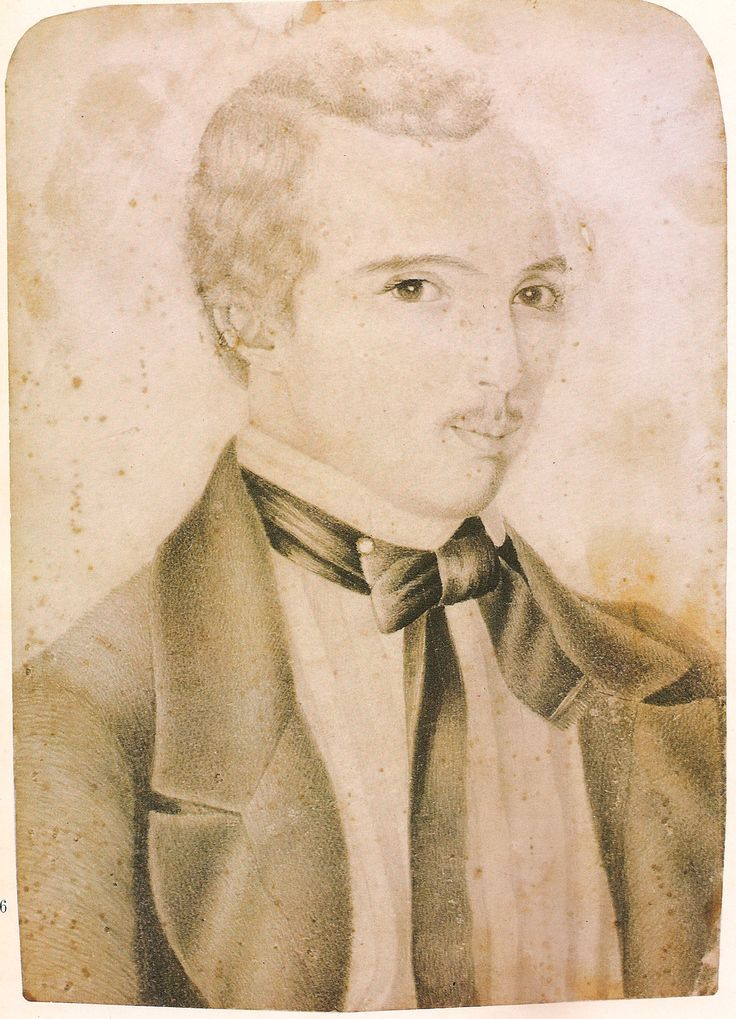
Self-portrait (date unknown)

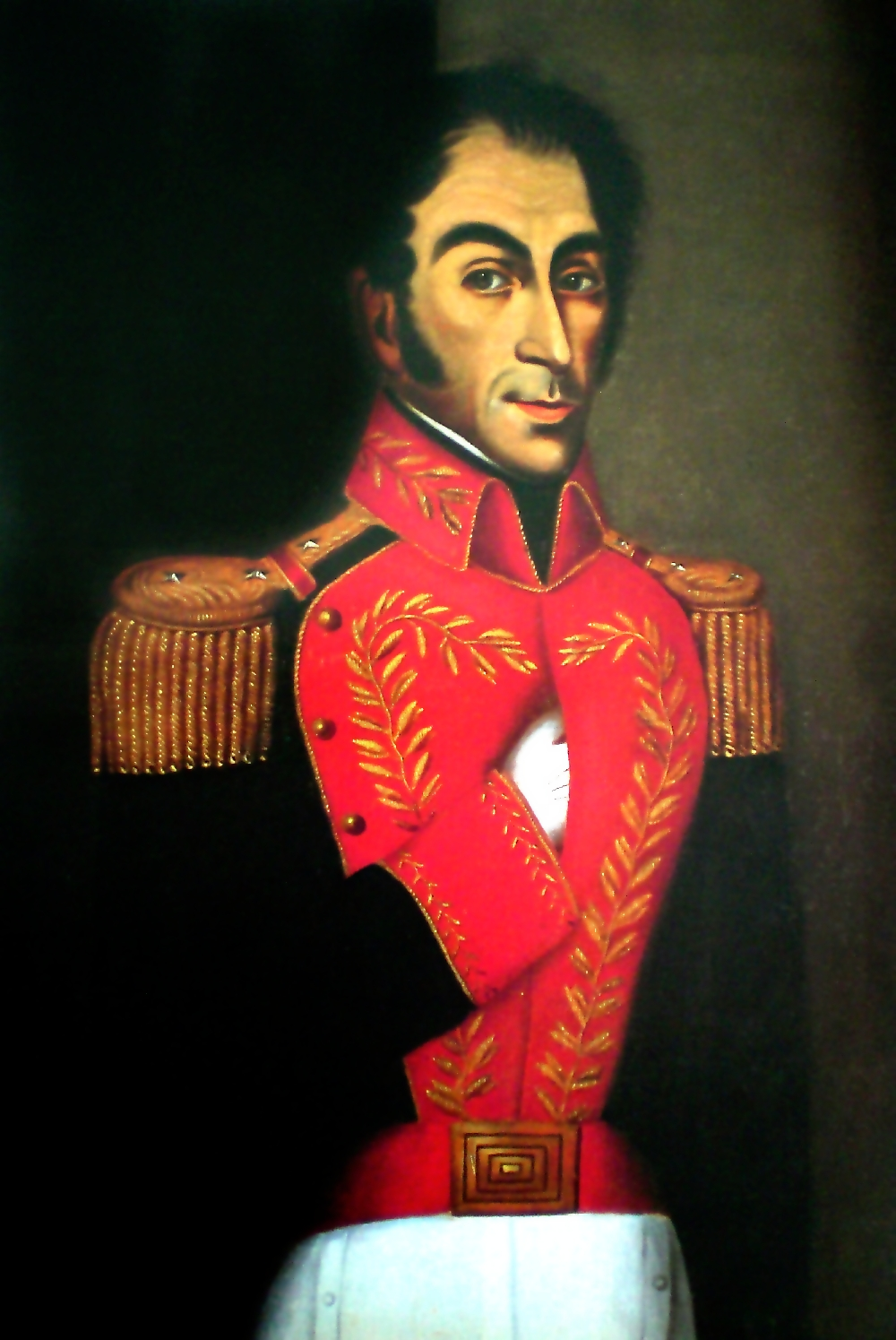
Portrait of Simón Bolívar (1827)

Juan Lovera (11 July 1776, Caracas, Province of Venezuela, Spanish Empire - 29 January 1841, Caracas, Province of Caracas, Venezuela) was a Venezuelan painter, best known for his portraits and historical scenes relating to his country's independence movement.

== Biography ==
His father was the Chandler of Caracas Cathedral and he received his first art lessons at the Dominican convent of San Jacinto. Later, he was apprenticed to Antonio José Landaeta (?-?), one of a family of influential Baroque painters in 18th-Century Caracas. By 1799, he had his own workshop, where two of his first portrait sitters were Alexander von Humboldt and Aimé Bonpland.

He fought for the cause of independence, which resulted in his persecution following the collapse of the First Venezuelan Republic in 1812. Two years later, when Caracas was invaded by the army of José Tomás Boves, he fled to Cumaná. Some accounts say he remained there, teaching art, others say he travelled through the West Indies. Either way, after Venezuela became part of Gran Colombia, he returned to Caracas.

In 1821, Carlos Soublette offered him the position of Corregidor, which he reluctantly accepted and, one year later, was promoted to Alcalde ordinario. From 1821 to 1823, he also worked on decorating the meeting room of the Cabildo.

After 1824, he had a number of notable figures as portrait sitters, including José Antonio Páez, Cristóbal Mendoza, Simón Bolívar and José María Vargas. He was also an associate of General Francisco de Paula Avendaño (1792-1870), who established Venezuela's first lithographic workshop in 1828.

His last years were devoted almost entirely to teaching. One of his most prominent students was Pedro Lovera (1826-1914), who was long believed to be his son, but may have been his nephew. He was also a professor at the drawing academy. The Caracas art society, founded after his death in 1841, was partly inspired as a way of honoring his memory.
