= Fuentesecas =

Coordinates: 41°38′N 5°28′W

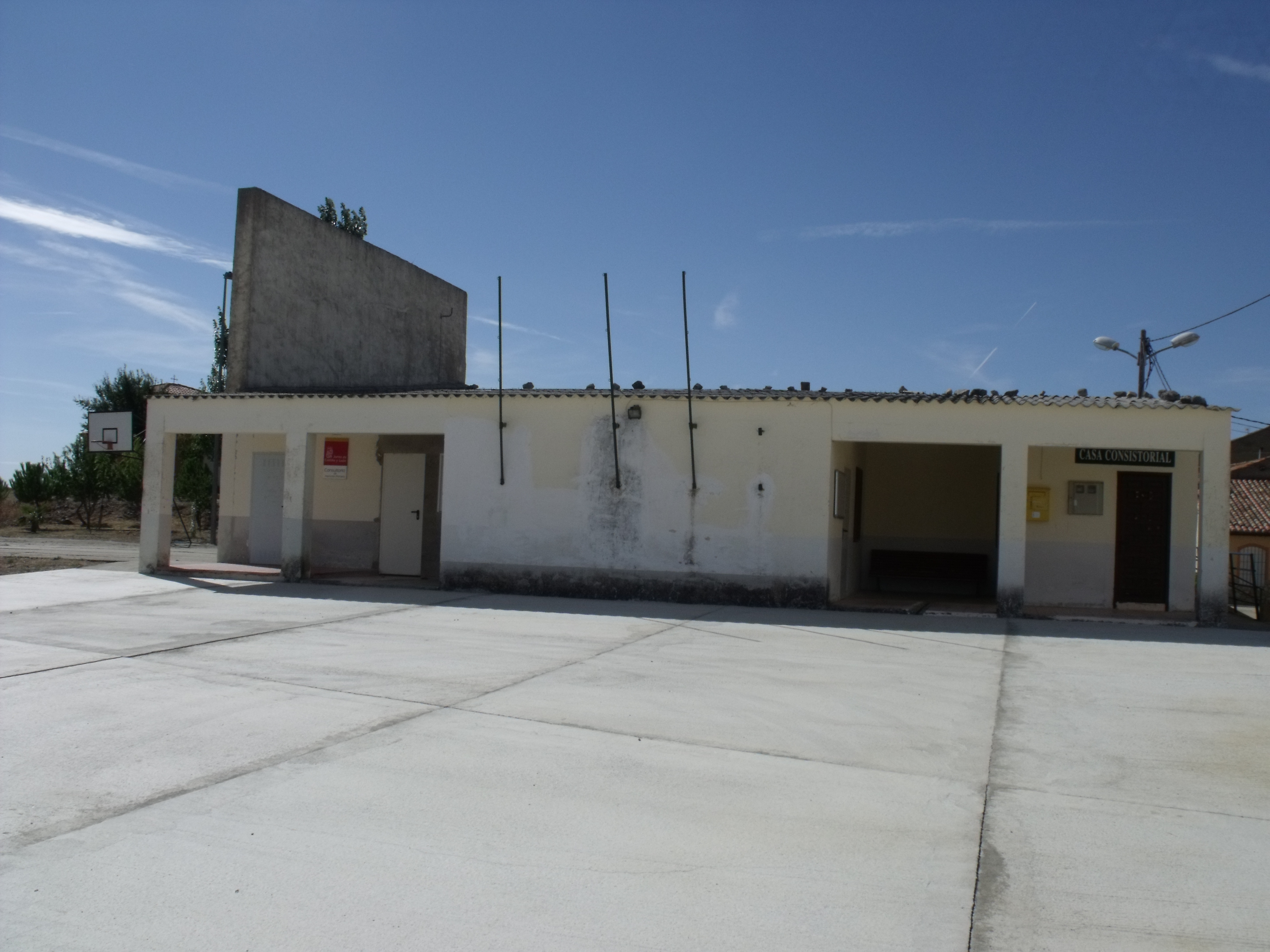
- Interactive map of Fuentesecas
- Country: Spain
- Autonomous community: Castile and León
- Province: Zamora
- Municipality: Fuentesecas

Area
  - Total: 14 km^{2} (5.4 sq mi)

Population (2025-01-01)
  - Total: 43
  - Density: 3.1/km^{2} (8.0/sq mi)
- Time zone: UTC+1 (CET)
  - Summer (DST): UTC+2 (CEST)

Fuentesecas is a municipality located in the province of Zamora, Castile and León, Spain. According to the 2004 census (INE), the municipality has a population of 86 inhabitants.
