= 12359 Cajigal =

Themistian asteroid from the outer region of the asteroid belt

Discovery
- Discovered by: O. A. Naranjo
- Discovery site: Llano del Hato – Mérida
- Discovery date: 22 September 1993

Designations
- Named after: Juan Manuel Cajigal y Odoardo (mathematician, engineer, and statesman)
- Alternative designations: 1993 SN_{3} · 1976 UU_{2} 1998 QB_{9}
- Minor planet category: main-belt · Themis

Orbital characteristics
- Epoch 4 September 2017 (JD 2458000.5)
- Uncertainty parameter 0
- Observation arc: 40.39 yr (14,754 days)
- Aphelion: 3.6970 AU
- Perihelion: 2.7026 AU
- Semi-major axis: 3.1998 AU
- Eccentricity: 0.1554
- Orbital period (sidereal): 5.72 yr (2,091 days)
- Mean anomaly: 53.802°
- Mean motion: 0° 10^{m} 19.92^{s} / day
- Inclination: 0.9455°
- Longitude of ascending node: 175.05°
- Argument of perihelion: 223.78°

Physical characteristics
- Dimensions: 10.49 km (calculated); 11.69±2.68 km 13.052±0.197 km
- Synodic rotation period: 11.7664±0.0038 h
- Geometric albedo: 0.08 (assumed); 0.095±0.022; 0.098±0.064
- Spectral type: C
- Absolute magnitude (H): 12.9 · 13.10±0.41 · 12.805±0.003 · 12.6 · 13.25 · 12.80

12359 Cajigal, provisional designation 1993 SN_{3}, is a carbonaceous Themistian asteroid from the outer region of the asteroid belt, approximately 12 kilometers in diameter.

The asteroid was discovered on 22 September 1993, by Venezuelan astronomer Orlando Naranjo at the Llano del Hato National Astronomical Observatory, Mérida, located in the Venezuelan Andes. It was named after Venezuelan politician and scientist Juan Manuel Cajigal y Odoardo.

== Orbit and classification ==
Cajigal is a member of the Themis family, a dynamical family of outer-belt asteroids with nearly coplanar ecliptical orbits. It orbits the Sun at a distance of 2.7–3.7 AU once every 5 years and 9 months (2,091 days). Its orbit has an eccentricity of 0.16 and an inclination of 1° with respect to the ecliptic.

In October 1976, t was first observed as 1976 UU_{2} at Crimea–Nauchnij. The body's observation arc begins 2 years prior to its official discovery observation, with a precovery taken at Steward Observatory (Kitt Peak–Spacewatch) in June 1991.

== Physical characteristics ==
=== Lightcurve ===
In September 2010, a photometric lightcurve of Cajigal obtained in the R-band by astronomers at the Palomar Transient Factory in California, gave a rotation period of 11.7664 hours with a brightness variation of 0.27 magnitude (U=2).

=== Diameter and albedo ===
According to the survey carried out by the NEOWISE mission of NASA's Wide-field Infrared Survey Explorer, Cajigal measures 11.69 and 13.052 kilometers in diameter, and its surface has an albedo of 0.098 and 0.095, respectively. The Collaborative Asteroid Lightcurve Link assumes a C-type like standard albedo for members of the Themis family of 0.08 and calculates a diameter of 10.5 kilometers with an absolute magnitude of 13.25.

== Naming ==
This minor planet was named after Venezuelan mathematician, engineer, and statesman, Juan Manuel Cajigal y Odoardo (1803–1856), who introduced the study of mathematics and engineering in his country with his founding of the Military Academy of Mathematics in 1831. He also installed the first astronomical telescopes in Caracas, where the Cajigal Observatory ("El Observatorio Cajigal") was later established in 1888. The official naming citation was published by the Minor Planet Center on 10 September 2003 (M.P.C. 49675).
