= Pablo Morillo =

Spanish military officer and colonial administrator (1775–1837)

Pablo Morillo y Morillo
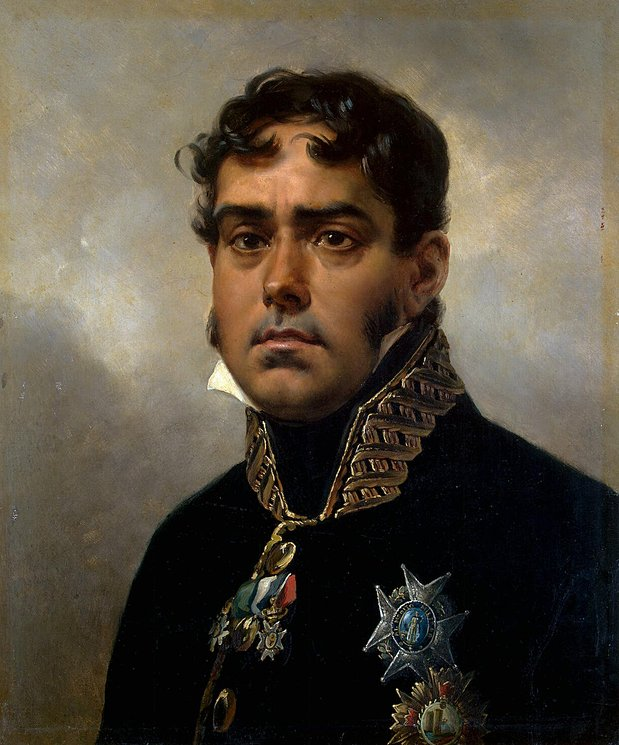
- Portrait by Horace Vernet, 1820

Captain General of Venezuela
- In office 1815–1816
- Monarch: Ferdinand VII
- Preceded by: Juan Manuel Cajigal
- Succeeded by: Salvador de Moxó
- In office 1819–1820
- Preceded by: Juan Bautista Pardo
- Succeeded by: Miguel de la Torre

Personal details
- Born: 5 May 1775 Fuentesecas, Spain
- Died: 27 July 1837 (aged 62) Barèges, France
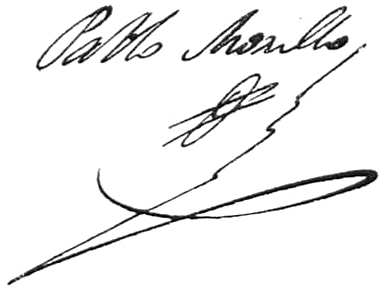
- Signature

Military service
- Allegiance: Spain
- Branch/service: Spanish Navy; Spanish Army
- Rank: Lieutenant general
- Commands: Ejército Expedicionario de Tierra Firme
- Battles/wars: War of the First Coalition; French expedition to Sardinia; War of the Pyrenees; Siege of Roses (1794–1795); Anglo-Spanish War (1796–1808); Battle of Cape St. Vincent (1797) (POW); Assault on Cádiz (1797); Battle of Trafalgar (POW); Peninsular War; Battle of Bailen; Battle of Puente Sanpayo; Battle of Vitoria; Spanish American wars of independence; Spanish reconquest of New Granada; Siege of Cartagena (1815)

Lieutenant-General Pablo Morillo y Morillo, Count of Cartagena and Marquess of La Puerta (5 May 1775 – 27 July 1837), known as El Pacificador (The Pacifier), was a Spanish military officer and colonial administrator who served in the French Revolutionary and Napoleonic Wars and Spanish American wars of independence. He fought against French forces in the Peninsular War, where he gained fame and rose to the rank of field marshal for his valiant actions. After the restoration of the Spanish Monarchy, Morillo, then regarded as one of the Spanish Army's most prestigious officers, was named by King Ferdinand VII as commander-in-chief of the Expeditionary Army of Costa Firme with the goal to restore absolutism in Spain's possessions in the Americas.

Born to a peasant family in Fuentesecas, Spain, at the age of 16 he joined the Spanish Marine Infantry and fought in the Battle of Cape St. Vincent and Battle of Trafalgar; both times he would be taken prisoner. After the outbreak of the Peninsular War, Morillo left the Spanish Navy and joined the Spanish Army and fought at the Battle of Bailen under the command of General Castaños; he would also be present at the Battle of Vitoria. He rose through the ranks quickly during the war. His actions at the Battle of Puente Sanpayo won him fame, as he commanded an army that defeated Marshal Ney and forced the French army to evacuate Galicia.

After the end of the war, in 1814, Morillo was named Captain General of Venezuela and given command of an Expeditionary Army to defeat the rebellions in New Granada and Venezuela. This expeditionary force of 60 ships and 10,000 men left Spain in early 1815, arriving in Venezuela in the spring of 1815. Morillo led a successful campaign to reconquer New Granada. His victory at the Siege of Cartagena earned him the title of Count of Cartagena. He successfully reconquered New Granada in 1816 and ordered the execution of various independence leaders as well as the confiscation of their assets.

In 1817, he returned to Venezuela, where Simón Bolívar had begun a new campaign to liberate Venezuela from Spanish rule. He fought Bolívar to a stalemate, then he managed to best him at the Third Battle of La Puerta in 1818, where he was wounded and successfully defended the capital, Caracas, from Bolívar's forces. This earned him the title of Marquess of La Puerta. After the loss of New Granada in 1819, the war shifted, and in 1820 Morillo signed an armistice with Bolívar and later also signed the Treaty of Armistice and Regularization of War. After repeated requests for retirement, Morillo was finally given royal approval and returned to Spain in 1821. After his service in South America he was appointed Captain General of New Castille in May 1821, a position from which he resigned the following year. In 1832 he was appointed captain general of Galicia, a position he left for health reasons in 1835. He died in the French city of Baregés, where he had gone to take medicinal baths, on July 27, 1837.

== Early career ==
In 1791, he enlisted in the Real Cuerpo de Infantería de Marina (Spanish Royal Marine Corps) and during the War of the First Coalition participated in the landing operation on San Pietro Island in 1793, as part of the campaign that repelled the French expedition to Sardinia and later that year was wounded at the Siege of Toulon.

During the War of the Pyrenees, he took part in the Siege of Roses (1794–1795).

During the Anglo-Spanish War (1796–1808), Morillo saw action at the Battle of Cape St. Vincent (1797), on board the San Isidro, which was captured and he was taken prisoner. The following October he was promoted to sergeant and sent to Cadiz, where he took part in the defense of the city following the British assault and blockade.

At the Battle of Trafalgar (October 1805), he was wounded while serving on board the San Ildefonso, which was captured. Morillo then spent the following three years at the barracks at Cadiz awaiting an assignment on one of the few Spanish ships that survived the defeat.

== Peninsular War ==
With the outbreak of the War, Morillo left the Spanish Navy to enlist in the Llerena Voluntary Corps, in which, given his military experience, he was made a sub-lieutenant. In June 1808, he saw action at the Battle of Bailen and, later that year, saw action at Elvas, Almaraz and Calzada de Oropesa. He was promoted to lieutenant that December. The following January he was promoted to captain and sent to Vigo, in Galicia, where the commander of the French garrison, besieged by guerrilleros, refused to capitulate to civilians and demanded the presence of a high-ranking officer.

Morillo's rank was not accepted, but as the only officer present, the besiegers appointed him their colonel, and he was thus able to negotiate the terms of capitulation. Regarding this incident, Oman (1903), citing various sources, offers a different version of the events at Vigo. (Note: "When Soult had passed out of sight on the way to Orense, the Galicians of the coast-land, headed by Pablo Morillo, a lieutenant of the regular army whom La Romana had sent down from the interior, and by Manuel Garcia del Barrio, a colonel dispatched by the Central Junta from Seville, had taken arms in great numbers, and blockaded Vigo. The French commander, Colonel Chalot, found himself unable to defend the whole extent of the fortifications for sheer want of men, and could not prevent the insurgents from establishing themselves close under the walls and keeping up a continual fire upon the garrison. He believed that a serious assault would infallibly succeed, and only refused to surrender because he was ashamed to yield to peasants. On March 23 two English frigates, the Lively and Venus, appeared off the harbour mouth, and began to supply the insurgents with ammunition, and to land heavy naval guns for their use. On the twenty-seventh one of the gates was battered in, and the Galicians were preparing to storm the place, when Chalot surrendered at discretion, only stipulating that he and his men should be handed over to the British, and not to the Spaniards. This request was granted, and Captain Mackinley [captain of HMS Lively] received twenty-three officers and nearly 800 men as prisoners, besides a number of sick and several hundred non-combatants...". (Oman 1903, pp. 264–265.))

Following the capitulation of Vigo, Marshal Ney occupied Santiago de Compostela, and headed towards Vigo. Morillo's troops intercepted the French force, and at the Battle of Puente Sanpayo, forced it to retreat.

== Spanish American war of independence ==
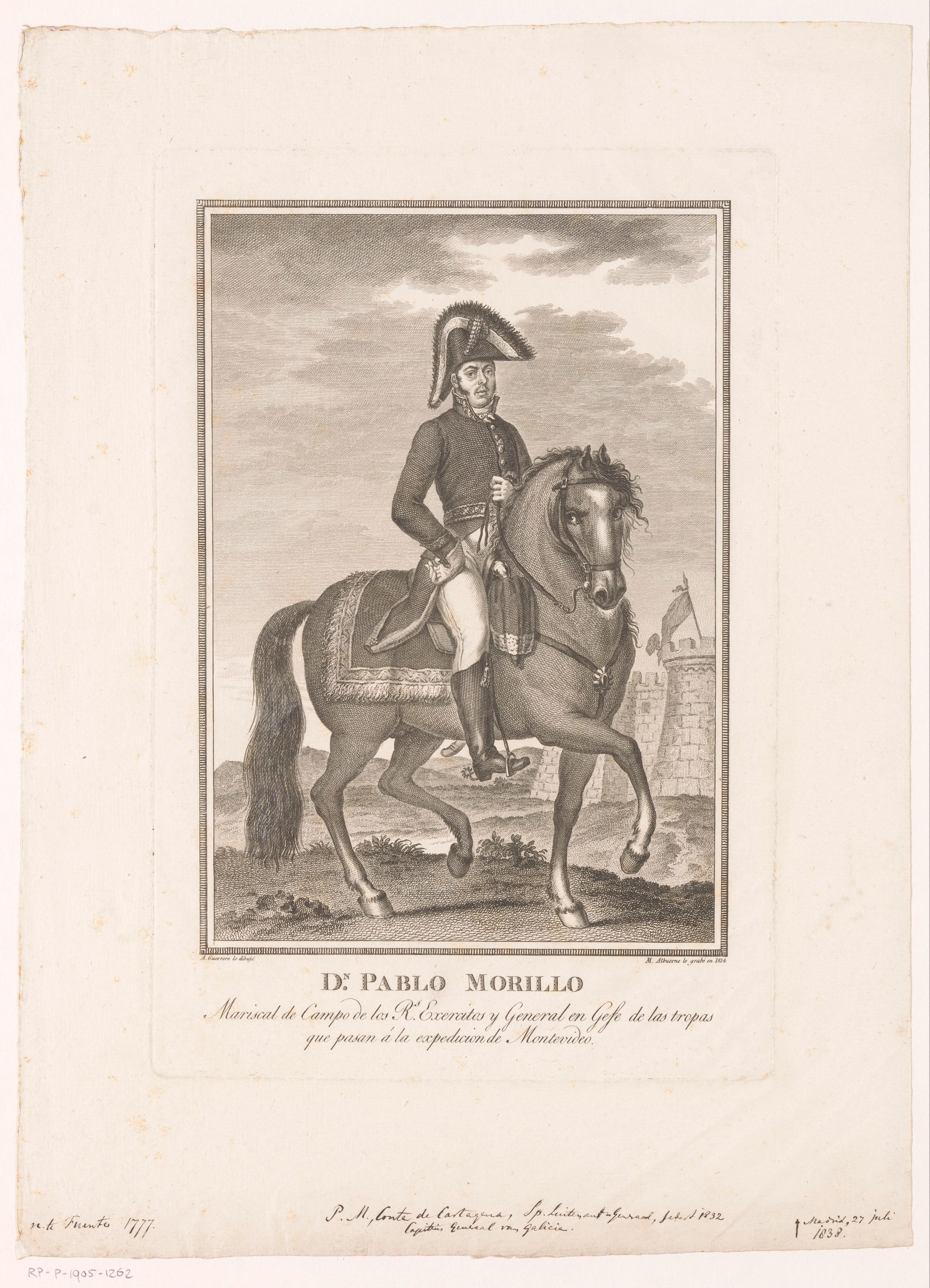
An engraving made in 1814, with caption "Field Marshal Pablo Morillo of the Royal Armies and Commander-in-chief of the expeditionary troops destined for Montevideo"

Once the war ended and the Spanish monarchy was restored, on August 14, 1814, Ferdinand VII of Spain appointed Morillo as Commander of the Expeditionary Army of the Americas with the purpose of quashing the rebellion and restoring order in the Viceroyalty of Rio de la Plata. This expeditionary force would be recruited and organized in the port city Cadiz, a large effort was expended to acquire a large number of troops and amount of material that would keep them well supplied, despite this however morale was low and the expedition was unpopular amongst the troops due to the long journey, tropical diseases, and the nature of warfare being conducted in Spanish America. As a result of this sentiment by December 1814 all troops bound for the Americas were restricted to their barracks and heavily monitored to prevent desertion.

On February 17, 1815, Morillo, onboard the 64-gun ship of the line San Pedro Alcántara, set sail from Cádiz for Montevideo with a fleet of 18 warships and 42 troopships transporting some 10,400 troops, most of whom were veterans of the Peninsular War. Unknown to his troops in November 1814 Morillo had been secretly informed that his destination would be changed, the new orders from the Spanish Government were to sail to Costa Firme to put an end to the rebellion in New Granada and Venezuela, with this new mission the King named him Captain General of Venezuela in order to have all of the legal authority in order to reconquest that province. Morillo did not inform his troops of this decision until February 25, 1815, with the expedition well underway at sea which caused his troops to express further discontent as they had heard about how the war in Venezuela was a war to the death, Morillo would also be promoted to Lieutenant General during this journey. On 6 April the Expedition disembarked in Carupano and Isla Margarita off the coast of Venezuela, with the mission to pacify the revolts against the Spanish monarchy in the American colonies. Later, while heading to Cumaná, the San Pedro Alcántara exploded and sank between Coche and Cubagua on April 25. The loss of a thousand crew members and a million pesos that the ship was carrying meant that Morillo quickly traveled to the mainland and left a small garrison in Pampatar. He travelled to La Guaira, Caracas, Puerto Cabello, Santa Marta and Cartagena de Indias (United Provinces of New Granada) in a military campaign to fight Simon Bolívar's revolutionary armies.

=== Reconquest of New Granada ===
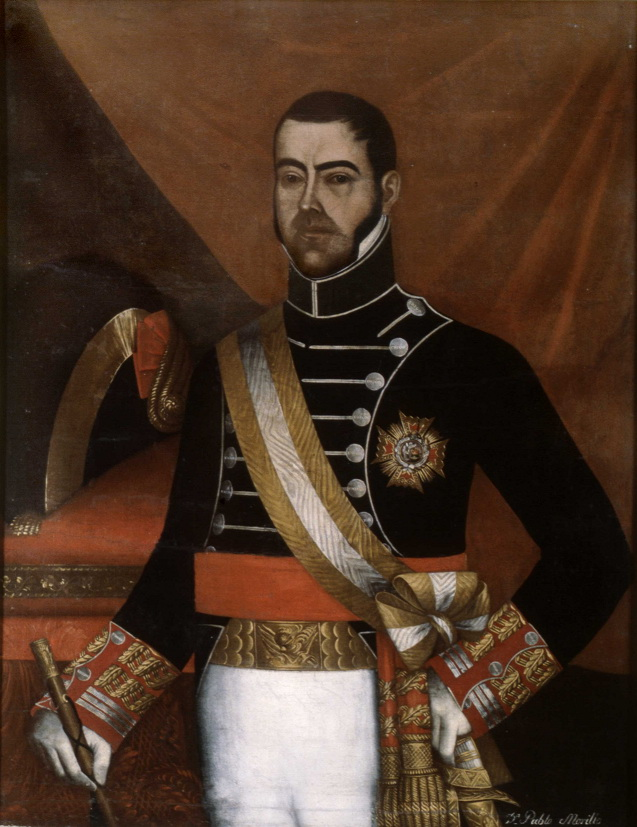
c. 1815 portrait of Morillo

On 22 August 1815, Morillo put the walled city of Cartagena under siege for 105 days, preventing any supplies from going in until 6 December that year, when the Spanish Royal Army entered the city. In a letter written to the Viceroy of Peru José Fernando de Abascal y Sousa dated December 7, Morillo informed the viceroy of the victory with minimal damage done to its fortifications and the capture of a large amount of artillery pieces and ample amounts of gunpowder he also described the level of starvation within the city where estimated that some 2000 Cartagenians where suffering from starvation.

The victory over the republicans in Cartagena led to the King granting Morillo the title Count of Cartagena. With control over Cartagena, Morillo continued with the Reconquest of New Granada marching south from Cartagena into the interior in tandem with Brigadier Juan de Samano's troops marching north from the Royalist strongholds of Quito and Pasto along with Colonel Sebastián de la Calzada's troops marching west from Venezuela. This campaign would culminate with the fall of the capital, Santa Fe, when his second-in-command General Miguel de la Torre assaulted the practically undefended city on May 6, 1816, Morillo himself entered the city on May 26.

Upon entering the capital an amnesty which had been granted by Brigadier de la Torre was revoked, and Morillo began a Reign of Terror in the city. The various leaders and intellectuals who had participated in the Juntas of 1810 and that were part of the Neogranadine independence movement were arrested and tried before a consejo de guerra which judged the accused of treason and rebellion, this resulted in the execution of more than a hundred notable Republican officials with many being executed in the main plaza of Santa Fe such as Camilo Torres Tenorio, Francisco Jose de Caldas, and Jorge Tadeo Lozano as well as countless others.

=== War in Venezuela ===
He then returned to Venezuela to continue the fight against revolutionaries, where Simón Bolívar had just returned from his exile in Haiti in a renewed effort to liberate Venezuela from Spanish rule. The Venezuelan patriots were able to capture the city of Angostura and made it their capital establishing the Third Republic of Venezuela.

He fought Bolívar's forces to a stalemate, then he managed to best him at the Third Battle of La Puerta in 1818, where he was wounded and successfully defended the capital, Caracas, from Bolívar's attack. This earned him the title of Marquess of La Puerta. In Barinas plains formed the Numancia battalion to reinforce the Spanish Army in Peru Viceroyalty during the Spanish American wars of independence. The Numancia marched on foot—an arduous journey of over 3,600 km from New Granada—crossing the Province of Quito and arriving in Lima in February 1819. They subsequently moved to Trujillo, where the 5th and 6th companies, which were severely understrength, filled their ranks with Peruvian recruits.

After the loss of New Granada in 1819, the war shifted when a large Spanish military expedition was assembling at Cádiz to reinforce royalist forces in Spanish America and suppress the independence movements. Commanded by Enrique José O'Donnell, Count of La Bisbal, with the naval forces under Francisco Mourelle, it was the largest expeditionary force Spain prepared after the expedition of Pablo Morillo in 1815. Estimates of its strength range from 20,000 to 25,000 troops, supported by a fleet of ships of the line, frigates, corvettes and transport vessels.

The expedition was never dispatched because the uprising led by Rafael del Riego on 1 January, 1820 forced King Ferdinand VII to restore the Cadiz Constitution of 1812. The revolt, supported by troops assigned to the expedition, prevented its departure and deprived Spain of the reinforcements intended for the royalist armies in America. According to Anthony H. Hull, Riego's liberal uprising marked "the death knell of the Spanish Empire in mainland America".

In June 1820, Morillo, under Royal mandate, ordered that everyone in the colonies obey the Cadiz Constitution and sent delegates to negotiate with Bolívar and his followers. On November 26, 1820 Bolívar and Morillo later met in the Venezuelan town of Santa Ana and signed a six-months' armistice followed by a second one covering the law governing the war. At that time, the Numancia battalion commanded by Lieutenant Colonel Roberto Delgado decide to join the Patriot governments of Peru by crossing the Huaura River on December 2, 1820. Following Morillo's resignation and subsequent departure on 20 December, 1820 the Captain General of Venezuela Miguel De la Torre also assumed supreme command of the Spanish army.

== Post-war career ==
Morillo returned to Spain, was named General Captain of New Castile, and supported the Liberal Constitution during the Liberal Triennium. He prevented a coup against the Constitution in 1822, and fought in 1823 the French invasion under Louis-Antoine, Duke of Angoulême in the north of Spain, where he was defeated.

When King Ferdinand VII restored the absolute regime in 1823, Morillo went to France. A few years later, he returned to Spain and participated in some military operations during the Carlist Wars. He felt ill and went back to France where he died on 27 July 1837, in Barèges.

== See also ==
- Spanish reconquest of New Granada
- Reconquista (Spanish America)
- Royalist (Spanish American Revolution)

== Bibliography ==
- Costeloe, Michael P. (1986). Response to Revolution: Imperial Spain and the Spanish American Revolutions, 1810–1840. Cambridge University Press. ISBN 0-521-32083-6
- Earle, Rebecca (2000). Spain and the Independence of Colombia, 1810–1825. University of Exter Press. ISBN 0-85989-612-9
- Stoan, Stephen K. (1959). Pablo Morillo and Venezuela, 1815–1820. Ohio State University Press.

Military offices
Preceded by Juan Manuel Cajigal	Capitan General of Venezuela; 1815–1816	Succeeded by Salvador de Moxó
Preceded by Juan Bautista Pardo	Capitan General of Venezuela; 1819–1820	Succeeded by Miguel de la Torre
