= Decree of War to the Death =

Simon Bolivar's declaration of no quarter

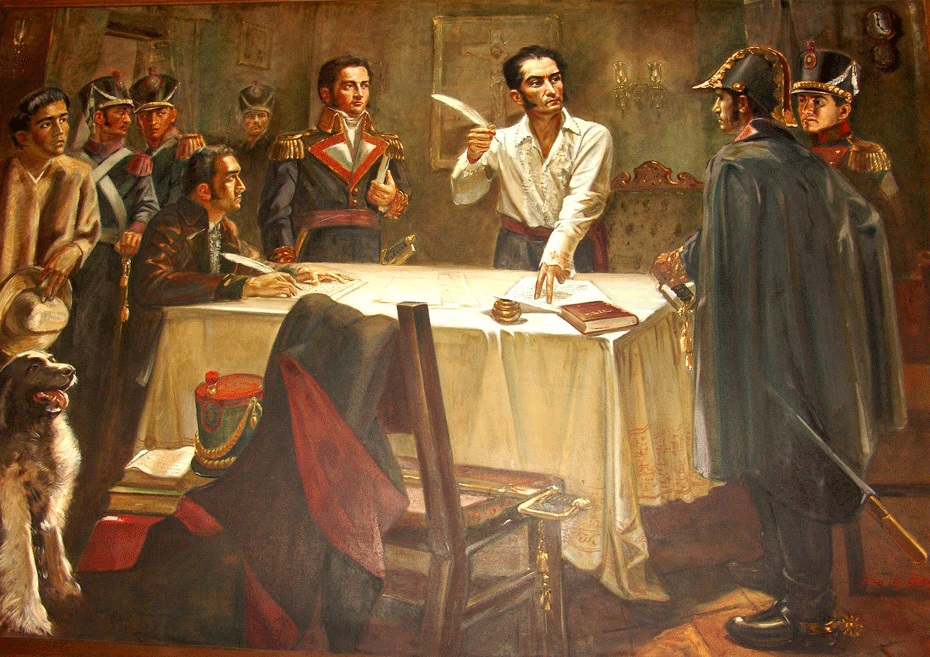
Simón Bolívar signs the Decree of War to the Death in 1813, during his Admirable Campaign.

The Decree of War to the Death, in Spanish Decreto de Guerra a Muerte, was a decree issued by the South American leader Simón Bolívar which permitted murder and any atrocities whatsoever to be committed against civilians born in Spain, other than those actively assisting South American independence, and furthermore exonerated people from the Americas who had already committed such murders and atrocities. The phrase "war to the death" was used as a euphemism for these atrocities.

The decree was an explicit "war of extermination" in Bolívar's attempt to maintain Venezuelan independence in the war with Spain, since he felt that the Spanish Army's use of atrocities against those who supported the First Republic of Venezuela had contributed decisively to its defeat.

Bolívar promulgated the decree on June 15, 1813, in the Venezuelan city of Trujillo.

== Background ==
The decree states that it was created as a response to severe crimes and massacres by Spanish soldiers after the fall of the First Republic, in which Spanish leaders allegedly stole property and executed thousands of Republicans: "we could not indifferently watch the afflictions inflicted to you by the barbaric Spaniards, who have annihilated you with robbery and destroyed you with death, infringed the most solemn treaties and capitulations [a reference to the San Mateo Capitulation, 1812]; in one word, committed every crime, reducing the Republic of Venezuela to the most horrific desolation." It proclaimed that all Peninsular people in Spanish America who didn't actively participate in favor of its independence would be killed, and all South Americans would be spared, even if they had cooperated with the Spanish authorities. (See below for full declaration). The document expressed concern over the suffering inflicted upon the Venezuelan populace and emphasized a commitment to safeguarding the interests of the country's elites, including those who had collaborated with Spanish authorities. It also outlined measures aimed at distinguishing between Peninsular individuals who actively supported independence and those who did not, with the intent of sparing South Americans from reprisals, regardless of their previous cooperation with Spanish authorities. Furthermore, the decree sought to redefine the conflict as an international war between Venezuela and Spain, thereby elevating its status from a regional rebellion to a recognized struggle for sovereignty.

== Practice of the "Guerra a Muerte" ==
This so-called Guerra a Muerte was widely practised on both sides, resulting in some extreme brutalities on both sides, such as the execution of Spanish prisoners in Caracas and La Guaira in February 1814, on orders from Bolívar himself, just before the collapse of the Second Republic of Venezuela, and the killing of several renowned citizens in New Granada by the royalist army under Pablo Morillo in 1815, 1816 and 1817.

The declaration remained in effect until November 26, 1820, when General Pablo Morillo met with Bolívar at Santa Ana de Trujillo to declare the war of independence a conventional war in the Treaty of the Regularization of the War.

== Text of the Decree ==
Venezuelans: an army of brothers, sent by the sovereign Congress of New Granada, has come to free you, and it is already amongst you, after evicting the oppressors from the provinces of Mérida and Trujillo.

We are the ones sent to destroy the Spaniards, to protect the Americans, and to reestablish the republican governments that formed the Confederation of Venezuela. The states covering our arms (weapons) are once again ruled by their old constitutions and magistrates, fully enjoying their liberty and independence; for our mission is only to break the chains of servitude, which still oppress some of our peoples, not claiming to create laws, or enforce acts of domination, which the right of war could authorize us to do.

Touched by your misfortunes, we could not indifferently watch the afflictions inflicted to you by the barbaric Spaniards, who have annihilated you with robbery and destroyed you with death, infringed the most solemn treaties and capitulations; in one word, committed every crime, reducing the Republic of Venezuela to the most horrific desolation. It is so that justice demands vindication, and necessity forces us to take it. May the monsters that infest Colombian soil, and have covered it with blood disappear for good; may their punishment be equal to the magnitude of their treason, so that the stain of our ignominy is washed off, and to show the nations of the universe that the sons of America cannot be offended without punishment.

In spite of our just resentments against the iniquitous Spaniards, our magnanimity still deigns itself to open, for the last time, a route to conciliation and friendship; we still invite them to live peacefully among us, if, hating their crimes and turning to good faith, they cooperate with us in the destruction of the intruding government of Spain, and the reestablishment of the Republic of Venezuela.

All Spaniards who do not conspire against tyranny in favor of our just cause, using the most effective and active resources, will be considered enemies, and will be punished as traitors to the homeland, and therefore, will be promptly executed. On the other hand, a general and absolute pardon is issued to all Spaniards who pass into our army, with or without their weapons; to those who offer aid to the good citizens working hard to shake off the shackles of tyranny. War officers and magistrates that proclaim the government of Venezuela and join our cause will keep their destinies and work positions; in one word, all Spaniards who perform service for the State will be reputed and treated as Americans.

And you, Americans, who have been separated from the road of justice by error and perfidy, know that your brothers forgive you and seriously regret your misdeeds, intimately persuaded that you cannot be guilty, and that only the ignorance and blindness imposed on you by the authors of your crimes could cause you to perpetrate them. Do not fear the sword that comes to avenge you and cut the ignominious bindings which tie you to your executioners' fate. Rely on absolute immunity for your honor, life and properties; the mere title of Americans will be your warranty and safeguard. Our weapons have come to protect you, and will never be used against a single one of our brothers.

This amnesty extends to the very traitors who have most recently committed their acts of felony; and will be so religiously carried out that no reason, cause or pretext will be enough to make us break our offer, no matter how extraordinary the reasons you give us to excite our adversity.

Spaniards and Canarians, count on death, even if indifferent, if you do not actively work in favor of the independence of America. Americans, count on life, even if guilty.

== See also ==
- Shoot on the Spot Declaration

== Bibliography ==
- Stoan, Stephen K. Pablo Morillo and Venezuela, 1815-1820. Columbus: Ohio State University Press, 1959.
