= Vicente Emparán =

18/19th-century Basque colonial official in Spanish Venezuela

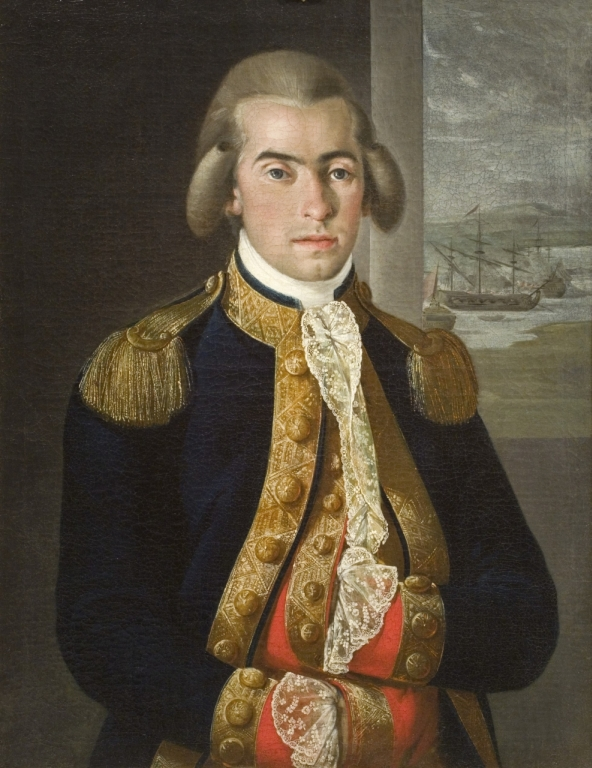
Vicente Emparán (1777) by Antonio Carnicero

Vicente Emparán (Spanish pronunciation: [biˈθente empaˈɾan], or sometimes Emparan [emˈpaɾan]; 1747 – 3 October 1842) was a Spanish Captain General.

Emparán was born in Azpeitia, Guipúzcoa, Basque Country, in 1747 as the son of José Joaquín de Emparan. He was governor of Cumaná Province in the Captaincy General of Venezuela between 1792 and 1804, where he had gained a favorable reputation among Venezuelans.

By 1808, Emparán had returned to Spain during the Peninsular War. There Joseph I's recently installed government named him Captain General of Venezuela, but after this appointment Emparán crossed over to the territory controlled by the Supreme Central Junta. He swore allegiance to the Junta and to Ferdinand VII, the king who was being held captive by the French invaders. In January 1809 the Central Junta ratified his appointment to replace the former captain general, Manuel de Guevara y Vasconcelos, who had died two years earlier.

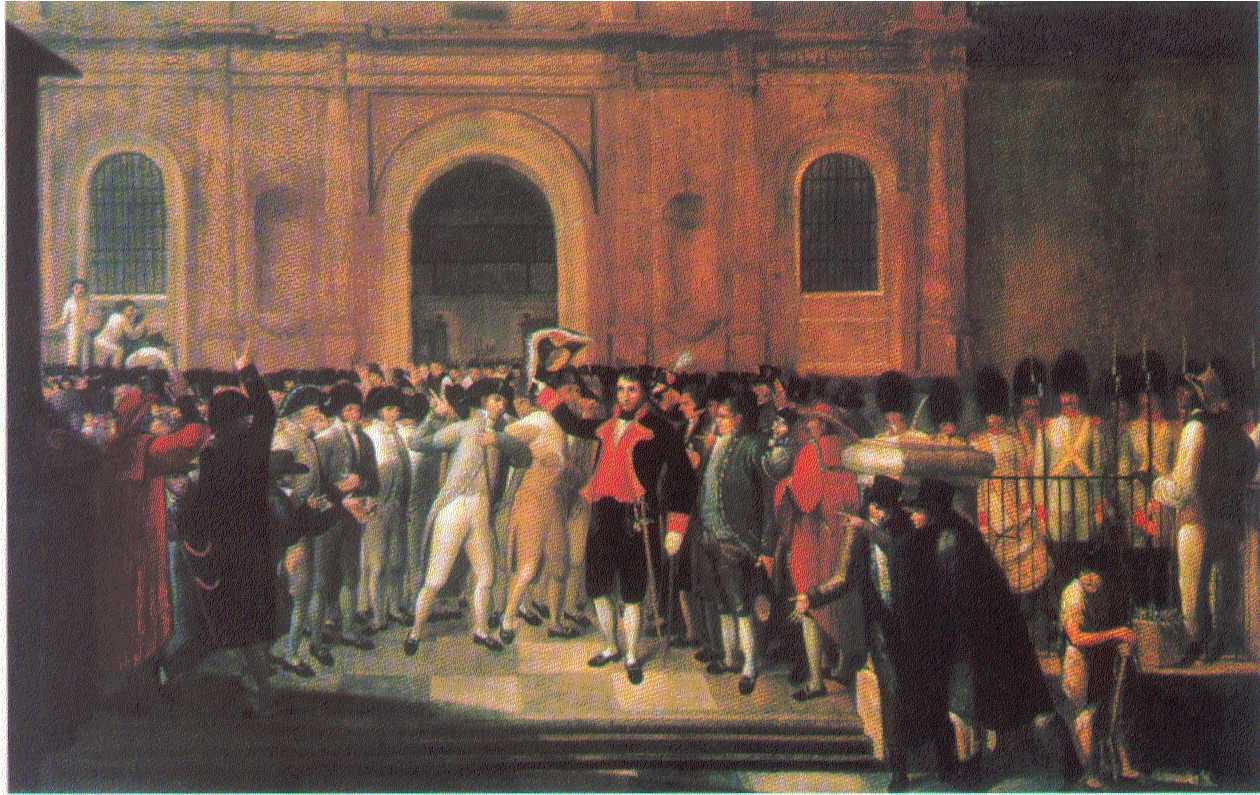
19 de Abril. Juan Lovera (1835). Lovera painted this scene from memory. Emparán (black uniform with red lapels) on the steps of the Cathedral surrounded by the city council members (in grey) and other prominent members of the crowd, who led him to the Cabildo. (Palacio Federal Legislativo, Caracas).

Emparán arrived in Venezuela in May 1809. During the following year he successfully avoided several attempts by the elites to establish a junta in Venezuela (among them the famous Conspiración de Los Mantuanos), often by personally talking with proponents of the movements. Although a well-liked governor, on 19 April 1810, various members of the municipal council (cabildo) of Caracas and other important residents took advantage of the large crowds gathered for Maundy Thursday services to orchestrate popular agitation for the establishment of a junta. The crowd prevented him from arriving at the cathedral for the day's services and he was directed to the cabildo building (today site of the Casa Amarilla) just across the main square from the cathedral. There he met with an expanded council (cabildo abierto). Emparán spoke directly to the crowd from the balcony of the building and seeing the amount of support for a junta, he voluntarily stepped down. The cabildo transformed itself into the Supreme Junta of Caracas, and began to manage the affairs of the province. Following his ouster, he left for Philadelphia, United States, from where he reported to the Spanish government on the events of 19 April, before returning to Spain. There, it seems, he was tried for his failure to stop the establishment of a junta, but was acquitted. He died in El Puerto de Santa María, Cádiz, Spain on 3 October 1842.

== See also ==
- First Republic of Venezuela

Military offices
Preceded by Manuel de Guevara y Vasconcelos (Juan de Casas as Interim Captain General after Guevara's death.)	Capitan General of Venezuela; 1809–1810	Succeeded by Fernando Miyares y Gonzáles
