= Juan Manuel de Cagigal =

Spanish captain general (1757–1823)

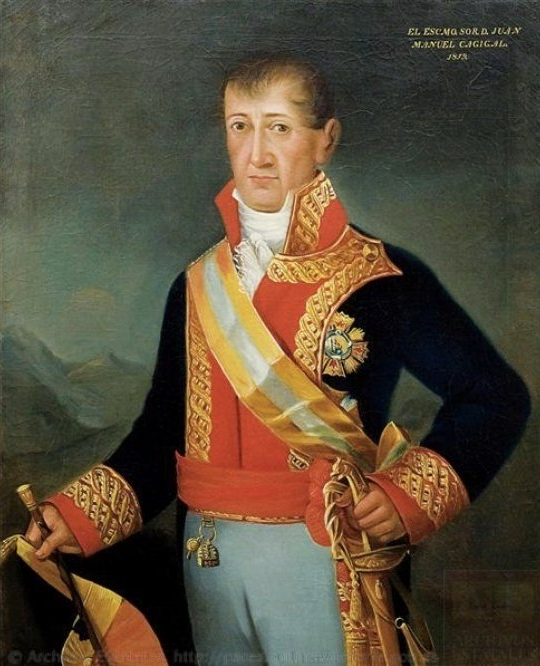
- Born: Juan Manuel Cagigal de la Vega y Martínez Niño; 1 February 1757; Cádiz, Spain
- Died: 26 November 1823 1823 (aged 65–66); Guanabacoa, Captaincy General of Cuba, Spanish Empire
- Military career
- Allegiance: Spain
- Conflicts: Spanish–Portuguese War (1776–1777); American Revolutionary War; Great Siege of Gibraltar; Assault on Cádiz (1797)

Juan Manuel Cagigal de la Vega y Martínez Niño (1757–1823) was a Spanish army commander and Captain general of Cuba and Venezuela, the third member of his family to hold that post.

== Biography ==
=== Early career ===
Cagigal joined the Asturias Infantry Regiment as a cadet in 1767 and was promoted to sub-lieutenant in 1772. He saw action in the Spanish–Portuguese War (1776–1777), under Pedro de Cevallos, at Santa Catarina Island and at Montevideo. In 1777, he was promoted to captain. Returning to Spain, he took part in the Great Siege of Gibraltar 1777. In 1781, he was sent to Santo Domingo, as part of the expedition to take Jamaica. He was promoted to lieutenant colonel in 1783, and appointed sargento mayor of the Zamora Regiment in 1791.

He was promoted to Infantry brigadier in the general promotion of 1795, which conferred upon him the command of his regiment. In 1796, he was appointed lieutenant colonel of the Volunteer Infantry Regiment of the State and in early July took part in the defence of Cádiz during the Royal Navy's assault on Cádiz in 1797.

=== Later career ===
After more than two decades of service, in 1799 Cagigal was posted to Venezuela as commander-in-chief of the Veteran Infantry Battalion of Caracas and the King's Lieutenant, an appointment which included the duties of deputy governor and deputy captain general of Venezuela.

From 1804 he served as governor of New Andalusia Province (capital, Cumaná) in eastern Venezuela, resigning in 1809 and turning down the governorship of Chile, the following year.

Promoted to field marshal in 1812, he was appointed captain general of Venezuela in 1817. He oversaw the royalist advances carried out by José Tomás Boves, who acted in an independent manner. After repeated requests to be allowed to resign, Cajigal was able to hand over command to Pablo Morillo in April 1815 and early the following year he was back in Spain, where he was stationed at the barracks in El Puerto de Santa María.

Although he had been appointed Captain general of Venezuela in 1817, he did not take up that appointment and was appointed Captain general of Cuba in 1819. The following year he was forced to accept the restoration of the Spanish Constitution of 1812. He requested to be allowed to resign due to health problems and he was substituted by Nicolás de Mahy in 1821 and retired to Guanabacoa, where he died in 1823.

His cousin, the Venezuelan mathematician Juan Manuel Cajigal y Odoardo, orphaned at an early age, went back with him to Spain in 1816 to study Mathematics in Madrid.

== See also ==
- Royalist (Hispanic American Revolution)

== Sources ==
- Bencomo Barrios, Héctor. "Juan Manuel Cajigal y Niño," Diccionario de Historia de Venezuela. Caracas: Fundacíon Polar, 1997. ISBN 980-6397-37-1
- Parra Pérez, Caracciolo. Historia de la Primera República de Venezuela. Madrid: Ediciones Guadarrama, 1959.
- Stoan, Stephen K. Pablo Morillo and Venezuela, 1815–1820. Columbus: Ohio State University Press, 1959.

Military offices
Preceded by Juan Domingo de Monteverde	Capitan General of Venezuela; 1814–1815	Succeeded by Pablo Morillo
