= Colombia–Ireland relations =

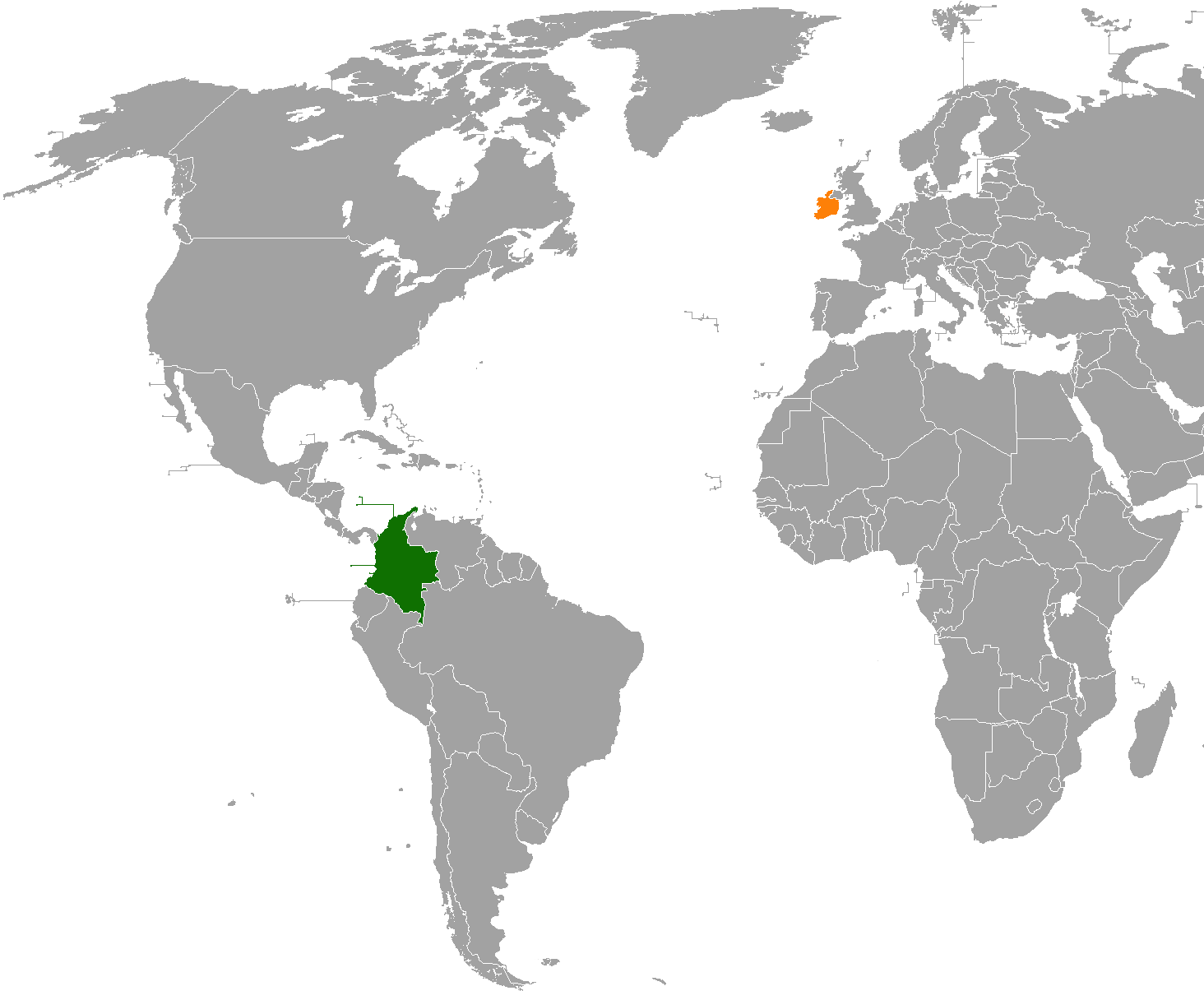

- Colombia: Ireland

Colombia–Ireland relations are the bilateral relations between Colombia and Ireland. The Irish have a long relationship with Colombia dating back to involvement by Irish volunteers in the Spanish American wars of independence (1808-1833).

== History ==
Irish volunteers played a central role in the wars in which Colombia gained independence from Spain. Between 1,000 and 2,000 Irish volunteers led by Irishmen such as William Aylmer, Francisco Burdett O'Connor and James Towers English assisted in the struggle. The Irish leader James Rooke led his British Legions with Simon Bolivar's army in its epic march from Eastern Venezuela across the plains and up into the Andes, where the Irish troops played a key role in the Battle of Vargas Swamp and the subsequent decisive Battle of Boyacá. When offered laurels after the victory at Boyacá, Bolívar credited the victory at Boyacá to the English and Irish volunteers, declaring that "those soldier liberators are the men who deserve these laurels". In the subsequent upheavals in Colombia in the 1820s, Irishmen such as Daniel Florence O'Leary, Arthur Sandes and John Johnston were among Bolívar's most faithful officers. Descendants of the Irish volunteers live in Colombia to this day.

In a different form of relationship, the Catholic lay movement Legion of Mary founded in Dublin, Ireland, by layman Frank Duff sent Seamus Grace and Alphie Lamb to Bogotá in 1953 to expand their mission in Colombia. Grace and Lamb established Legion praesidia throughout the country. The Legion was well received in Colombia, especially by the poor, brought many people back to the Catholic faith, and later expanded to other parts of South America.

== The Colombia Three ==
In 2001, Colombian police, acting on information from "an international security organisation", arrested three Irishmen in Bogota, alleging that they were members of the Provisional Irish Republican Army (IRA) and had been training members of the Revolutionary Armed Forces of Colombia (FARC), a revolutionary guerilla movement in Colombia. In 2005, the Colombia Three, as they had become known in Ireland, were able to flee to Ireland while waiting appeal. There is no extradition treaty between Ireland and Colombia. Ireland has taken no action to extradite the men back to Colombia.

== Formal relations ==
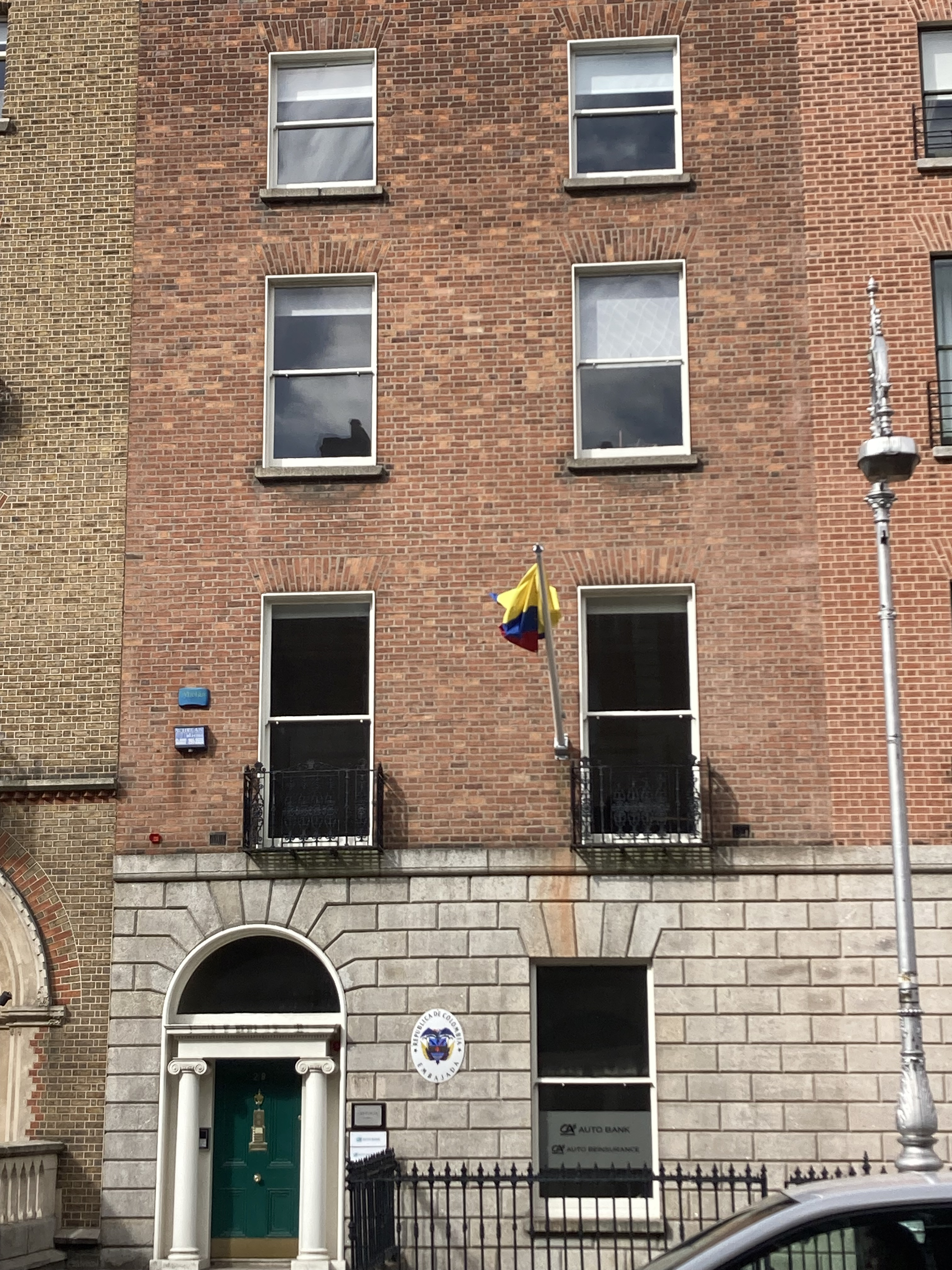
Embassy of Colombia in Dublin

Ireland established diplomatic relations with Colombia on 10 November 1999. In February 2017, Irish President Michael D. Higgins paid an official visit to Colombia, the first Irish head of state to visit the country. During his visit, President Higgins visited a FARC rebel army camp in a fully demobilised FARC zone and shook hands and spoke with senior FARC commander, Pastor Alape, upon his arrival. President Higgins also pledged €3 million Euros over the next five years in support of the Colombian Truth and Reconciliation process.

== Resident diplomatic missions ==
- Colombia has an embassy in Dublin.
- Ireland has an embassy in Bogotá.
