= Bolívar's campaign to liberate New Granada =

Military campaign in Venezuelan War of Independence (1819–1820)

- Part of the Colombian War of Independence and the Venezuelan War of Independence
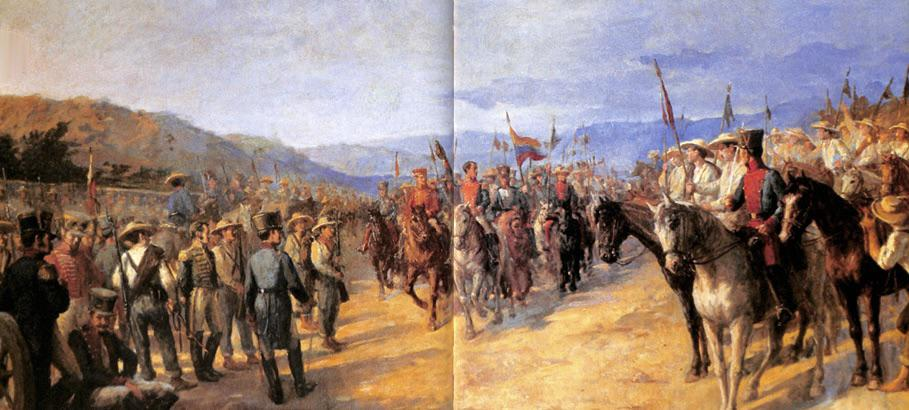
- The Battle of Boyacá by Ricardo Acevedo Bernal, 1920
Date	27 May – 10 August 1819
Location	Eastern and Central parts of the Viceroyalty of New Granada
Result	Republican victory: Defeat and capture of José María Barreiro; Collapse of the principal royalist field army defending Santafé; Flight of Viceroy Juan de Sámano; Occupation of Santafé by republican forces; Establishment of a republican administration under Francisco de Paula Santander
Territorial changes	Republican control established over Santafé de Bogotá and much of central New Granada; Spanish royalist authority persisted in other provinces

Belligerents
Republic of Venezuela; New Granadan republican forces: Patriot Army; British and Irish volunteers	Kingdom of Spain and the Indies (the Spains): Royalist forces of New Granada; Royalist Third Division

Commanders and leaders
Simón Bolívar (Commander-in-chief); Carlos Soublette (Chief of Staff); Francisco de Paula Santander (Vanguard Division); José Antonio Anzoátegui (Rearguard Division); Juan Nepomuceno Moreno (Casanare forces); Juan José Rondón (Cavalry commander); Pedro Fortoul (Vanguard staff officer) James Rooke (British Legion)	(Spain) Juan de Sámano (Viceroy of New Granada) (Spain) José María Barreiro (Royalist field commander; captured) (Spain) Francisco Jiménez (Royalist senior officer; captured) (Spain) Sebastián Díaz (Royalist officer)

Military formations
Liberator Army of New Granada and Venezuela: Vanguard Division; Cazadores Battalion; New Granadan contingents; Rearguard Division; Rifles Battalion; Barcelona Battalion; Bravos de Páez Battalion; British Legion; Republican cavalry; Llanero lancers; Guides of Apure; Guides of Casanare; Dragoons	Royalist Third Division: Royalist infantry; Royalist cavalry; Dragoons; Hussars of Ferdinand VII; Royalist artillery; Provincial royalist detachments

Strength
2,500 (1819)	4,500 (1819)

Bolívar's campaign to liberate New Granada, also known as the Liberation Campaign of 1819, was part of the Colombian and Venezuelan wars of independence and was one of the many military campaigns fought by Simón Bolívar. In 1819 Bolívar led a combined New Granadan and Venezuelan Army in a campaign to liberate New Granada which had been under Spanish control since 1816.

Bolívar marched his army through the flooded plains from Venezuela and entered the Casanare Province with his army in June 1819, combining his forces with those of Francisco de Paula Santander at Tame, Arauca, on 11 June. The combined Patriot force reached the Eastern Range of the Andes on 22 June and began a grueling crossing. On 6 July, the Patriots descended from the Andes arriving at Socha and into the valleys of central New Granada. After a brief convalescence, the Patriots fought a series of battles against the III Division of the Royalist army of Spanish colonel José María Barreiro Manjón, with the campaign culminating at the decisive Battle of Boyacá, where Bolivar's forces routed and dismantled the Royalist Army entering Santa Fe de Bogotá triumphantly 3 days later.

Bolivar's victory in New Granada (today: Colombia, Venezuela, Ecuador and Panama) secured the eventual independence of northern South America. It provided Bolívar with the economic and human resources to complete his victory over the Spanish in Venezuela and Colombia.

Bolívar's New Granada campaign is considered one of the most daring in military history, compared by contemporaries and some historians to Hannibal's or Napoleon's crossing of the Alps in 1800 and José San Martín's Crossing of the Andes in 1817.

== Background ==
During the years 1815 and 1816, Spain had reconquered most of New Granada, after having deployed the Expeditionary Army of Costa Firme under the command of General Pablo Morillo from Spain in early 1815. This effort was also aided by General Juan de Sámano and his royalist forces in the south of New Granada. After five years of de facto and official independence, Morillo reestablished Royalist government in Santa Fe, leaving Juan de Sámano as Viceroy, and returned to Venezuela with the bulk of his army in late 1816. By 1817, Bolívar had set up his headquarters in the Orinoco region in southern Venezuela. It was an area from which the Spaniards could not easily oust him. There he engaged the services of several thousand foreign soldiers and officers, mostly British and Irish, set up his capital at Angostura (now Ciudad Bolívar) and established liaisons with the revolutionary forces of the Llanos. This included one group of Venezuelan llaneros (cowboys) led by José Antonio Páez and another group of New Granadan exiles led by Colonel Francisco de Paula Santander, who was the commander of the remnant forces that made up the army of the United Provinces of New Granada and would join Bolivar's army.

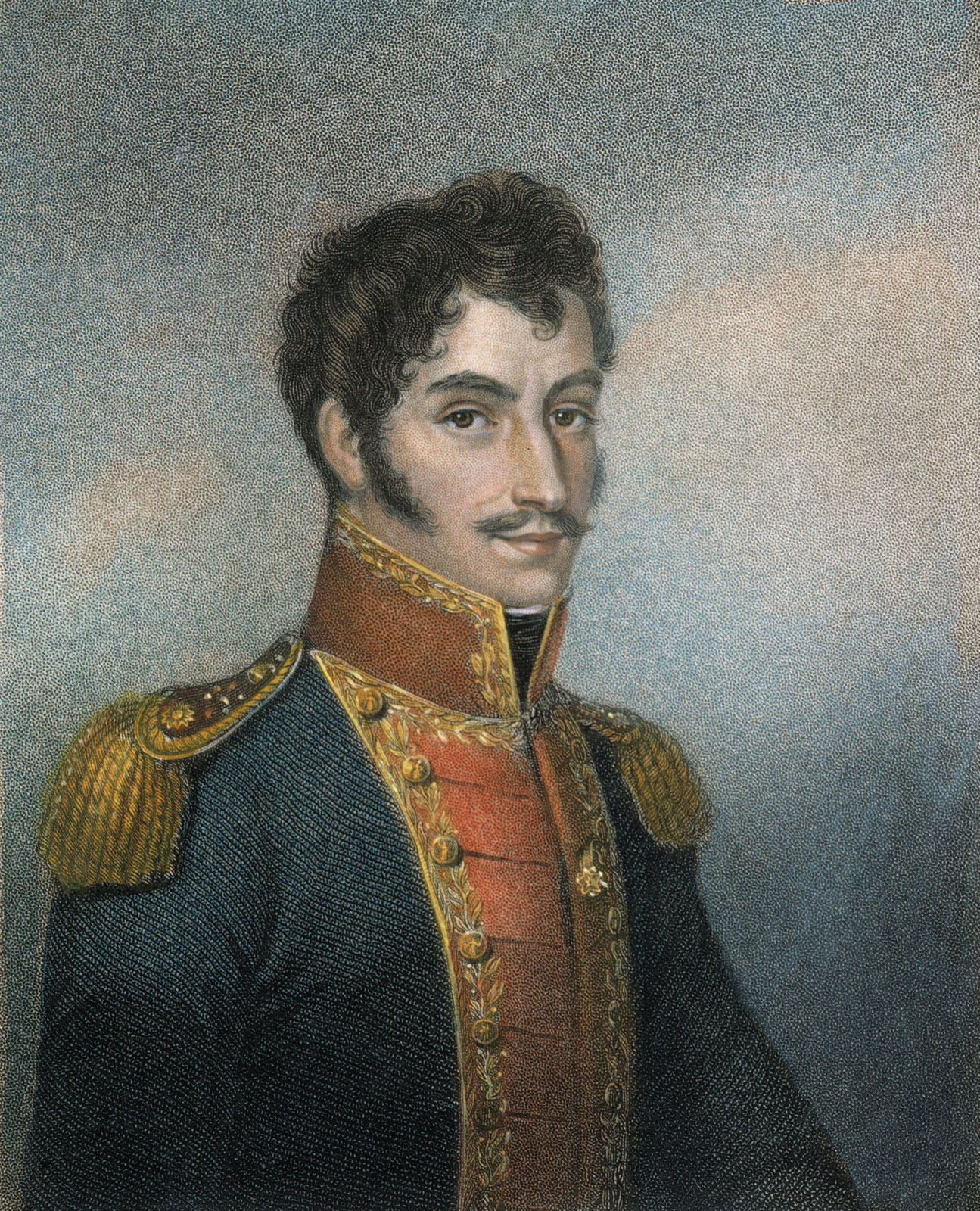
Simón Bolívar. Engraving by M.N. Bate.

With these forces he began a campaign from Guayana, pushing Morillo westwards where his forces would reach the gates of Caracas, only to be turned back by Morillo at the 3rd Battle of La Puerta. With this defeat Bolívar retreated to the safety of Llanos of the Apure region. In early 1819, Morillo's forces penetrated the Llanos of the Apure region with the goal of finishing off Bolívar. Bolívar defeated him at the Battle of Las Queseras del Medio in April, forcing Morillo to retreat to Calabozo, where he would stay to wait out the rain season.

After the failure of the Center Campaign a change in strategy was needed, thus the possibility of launching a military campaign to liberate New Granada was not a far-fetched idea. On August 15, 1818, in a proclamation Bolivar announced to the peoples of New Granada his intention to launch a military campaign in their country. However, most of his army was in tatters as a result of the Center Campaign, if there was any hope of carrying out this plan a new army would need to be raised, organized, and trained in order for any chance of success. The man for the job would be none other than Colonel Francisco de Paula Santander, who Bolivar had just promoted to Brigadier General on August 12, this would be followed by naming him Commander of the Vanguard of the Liberator Army of New Granada and dispatching him to the Llanos of the Casanare Province along with 1,200 muskets, uniforms, and other supplies, with the mission of creating and training a New Granadan army for a future campaign to liberate New Granada. Casanare was one of the few areas of New Granada that was free of Spanish presence, it harbored many of the New Granadans who had fled Morillo's reconquest.

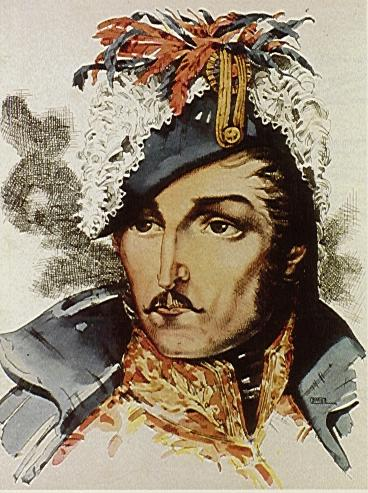
In August 1818, Francisco de Paula Santander would be tasked with building a new army in Casanare. Watercolor by Santiago Martinez Delgado.

Santander along with four other officers departed Angostura on August 27 arriving in Casanare on November 28, upon arriving he found the small Patriot forces in the region in a state of anarchy with their leaders Juan Galea, Antonio Arredondo, Ignacio Mariño, and Ramón Nonato Pérez constantly fighting each other. It would be here that Santander's organizational and leadership skills would shine, as upon arriving to the region he was able to calm the tensions amongst the military leaders in the region and impose his authority to get them to work towards a common goal.

Through the implementation of his military regulations, strict discipline, and knowledge of infantry tactics, over the course of several months Santander was able to transform a band of irregular guerrilla patriot forces into a disciplined fighting force of around 1,200 men composed of 2 line infantry battalions the first being the Cazadores Constantes Infantry Battalion and the First of the Line New Granadan Infantry Battalion along with a cavalry squadron. He would also implement a wide variety of strategies to prevent desertion, such as implementing a permit system to allow some of his men to return to their farms so that they could tend and herd cattle. This also served as a means to bolster the army's food supply given the scarcity his army suffered.

Politically he worked with the main stakeholders in the region to reestablish the defunct United Provinces through a provisional government. He also had his troops recognize the authority of Bolivar as President of Venezuela and Captain-general of the New Granadan and Venezuelan armies for the eventual union between the two's forces. He also sent 5 delegates to represent Casanare in the Congress of Angostura. While Santander did not discard the possibility of a permanent union between the two countries like the one Bolivar proposed, as Venezuelan support would be a necessity in order to liberate New Granada from the Spanish, he sought emphasize New Granadan autonomy and that the union be of two equals.

By early 1818, artillery Colonel José María Barreiro was the military commander of all royalist troops in New Granada, and counted with at least 4,500 trained soldiers of the III Division of the Expeditionary Army of Costa Firme scattered throughout the Kingdom. Since assuming command, he had been tasked with both to attacking and defending the kingdom against any rebel threat. He would soon have to deploy his army as both Viceroy Sámano and General Morillo through their intelligence service began to receive word of Santander's efforts to organize an army in Casanare, with the first reports detailing his presence in the region arriving in November 1818. Come early 1819 when Morillo penetrated the Apure region in Venezuela, Barreiro was instructed by him to attack Santander in Casanare. Barreiro then organized a force of 1,200 men and 540 cavalry in March 1819, crossing the Andes and arriving in the llanos and capturing Pore in early April.

This campaign was unsuccessful: the Royalist Army became exhausted as it was badly prepared for the campaign and began to stretch their supply lines thin as Santander withdrew deeper into the llanos, eventually forcing Barreiro to withdraw to the other side of the Andes and garrison his forces in Tunja as the rainy season set in. The failure of this campaign destroyed Spanish hopes for the destruction of the rebel threat in Casanare, from now on the III Division of the Royalist Army would limit itself to defending central New Granada from the potential threat of invasion.

== The campaign ==
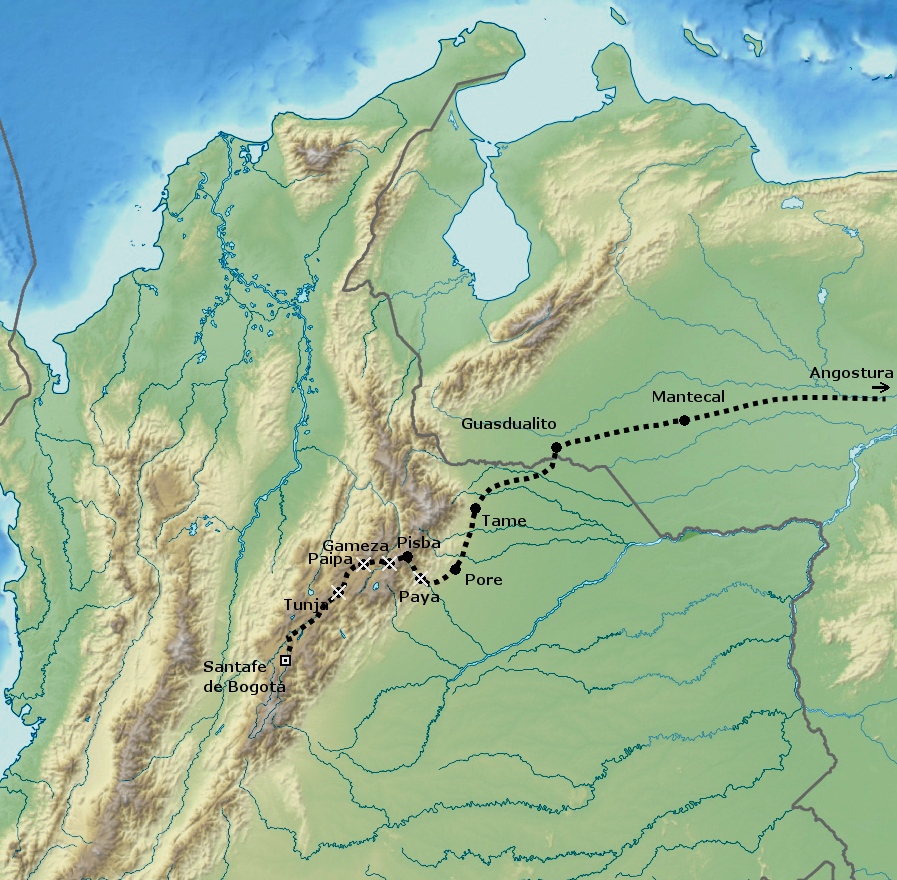
The Campaign to Liberate New Granada (1819).

Bolívar conceived of the operation in late 1818 and early 1819 after the Congress of Angostura began its deliberations and had reappointed him president of Venezuela. If Bolívar could liberate New Granada, he would have a whole new base from which to operate against General Pablo Morillo, head of the royalist forces in the area and end the stalemate in Venezuela. Central New Granada held great promise since, unlike Venezuela, it had only been recently conquered by Morillo and it had a prior six-year experience of independent government. Royalist sentiment, therefore, was not strong. But it would be hard to take the initiative against the better prepared and better supplied royalist army.

To surprise it, Bolívar's proposed plan would be to move during the rainy season, when the Llanos flooded up to a meter which usually forced both sides to their winter quarters, and penetrate Central New Granada by crossing the Cordillera Oriental at the Salina pass through the Tunja Province and from there and march on the capital Santa Fe. Success depended on the rapid penetration of the central New Granada. This would be done in tandem with a diversionary effort led by Paez to invade New Granada near Cucuta in order to distract both the II Division of the Royalist Army based in Barinas, Venezuela as well as the III Division based in New Granada. Also included in the proposed plan would be a naval landing near Santa Marta or Riohacha led by Scottish adventurer Gregor MacGregor. The proposed route, however, was considered impassable, and therefore the plan understandably received little support from the Congress or from Páez.

On May 15 Santander informed Bolivar of his successes against Barreiro's failed invasion of Casanare stating:

"Barreiro, general commander of this expedition, has seen with his own eyes that it is not with three or four thousand men that Casanare is conquered, and that it is not with terror that he can erase the feelings of patriotism that her own troops have for freedom. of their homeland"

He also informed Bolivar that his agents that he had dispatched on the other side of the Andes reported that the peoples of central New Granada were "enthusiastic for their independence". In light of these events, on May 23, in the town of Mantecal Bolivar gathered all of his officers and presented his plan for the invasion of New Granada, with them agreeing to the plan. Prior to setting out for New Granada, Bolivar wrote a letter to his vice president Francisco Antonio Zea informing him of the start of the campaign and its goals stating:

After the most serious meditations I have determined, having previously consulted the leaders of the army, to execute the most important operation that in our state can be undertaken... speed will be the motto of this campaign... I have been thinking about this endeavour for a long time and I hope it will surprise everyone, because no one is prepared to oppose it.

On May 25, Bolívar set out with his Venezuelan troops from the town of Mantecal in the Apure region of Venezuela westwards towards Tame in New Granada to meet up with the army Santander had formed to combine their forces and then set off for the Andes.

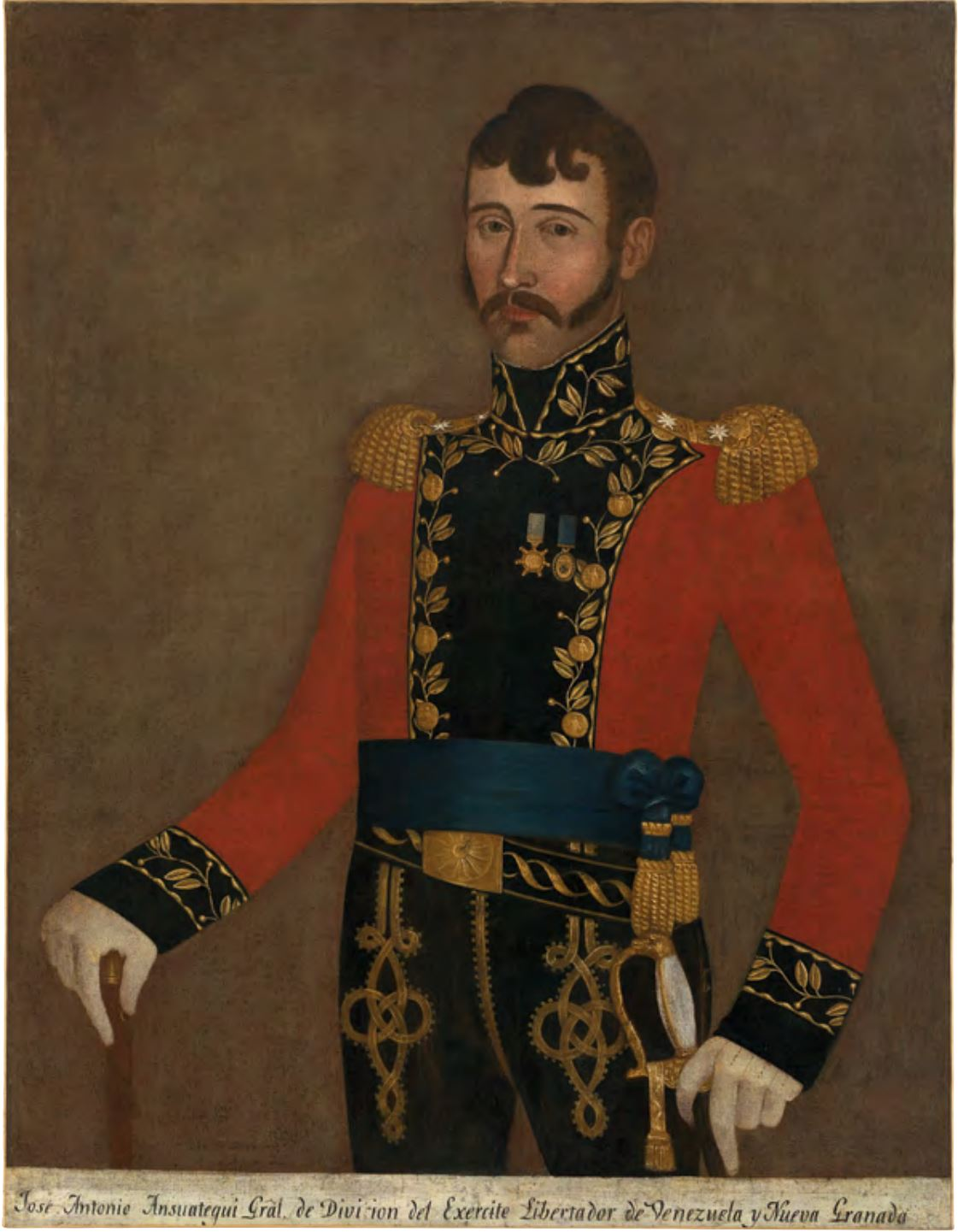
Brigadier General José Antonio Anzoátegui, commander of the Rearguard Division. painting by Pedro José Figueroa

During the march from Venezuela to New Granada a considerable number of horses and pack mules were lost to the flooded Llanos where they drowned. On June 4 they crossed the Arauca River and reached Tame on June 12, his army exhausted took the following days to rest. Once at Tame, Bolívar began the organization of the combined army of 2,500 men with him as commander-in-chief and General Carlos Soublette as his Chief of staff, the army was officially named the Liberator Army of New Granada and Venezuela. The army was organized into 2 Divisions, a Vanguard Division in the front of the army under the command of Brigadier General Francisco de Paula Santander, and a Rearguard Division, with the bulk of the army under the command of Brigadier General José Antonio Anzoátegui. Within this Rearguard Division was the British Legion under the command of Colonel James Rooke.

While at Tame, Bolivar and Santander conducted a war meeting in order to discuss which route the army would take to cross the Cordillera Oriental. While Bolivar had originally intended to take the route through La Salina pass, Santander disagreed with this and suggested taking the route through the Paramo de Pisba with Bolivar eventually agreeing with this recommendation. The pass through the Paramo de Pisba was the shortest and the least defended route, however it was also the most difficult and treacherous but with the greatest chance of surprising Spanish forces as it was deemed impassable by Barreiro especially during the rainy season. With the forces that he and Santander had recruited in the Apure and Meta River regions now combined, set off on June 17, 1819.

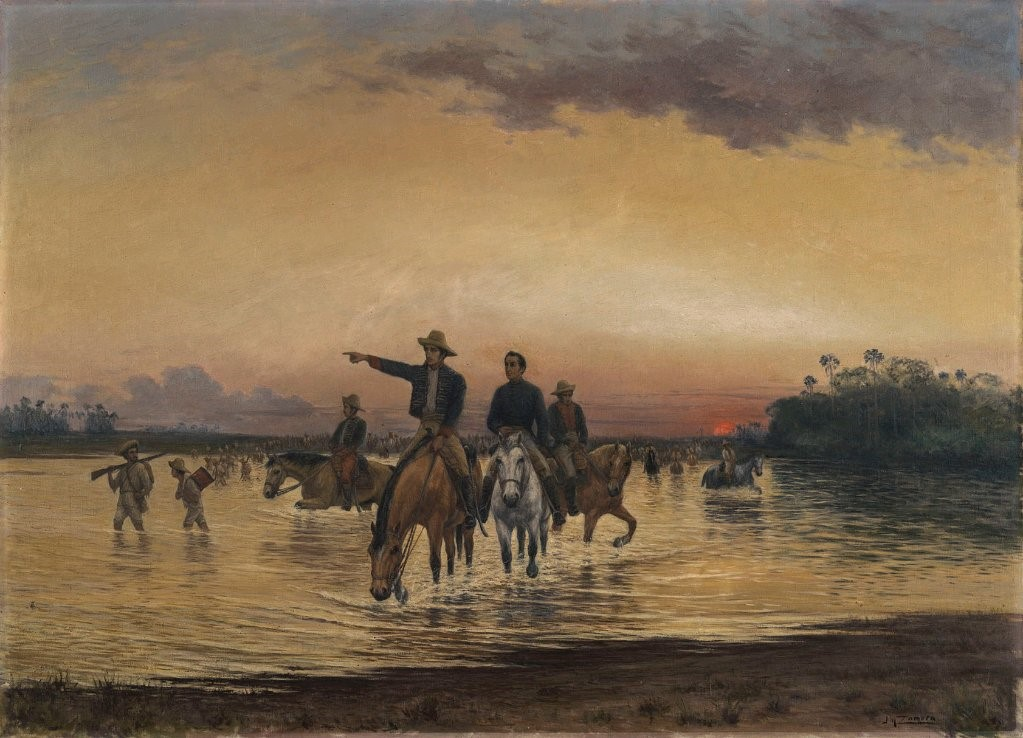
Bolívar and Santander traversing the flooded Llanos by Jesús María Zamora.

In order to reach the pass, the Patriot Army took the route that led to Morcote where the foothills of the Andes began which would lead them to Paya where they would begin their ascent to the last town, called Pisba, before crossing the Paramo, where they would reach the town of Socha on the other side of the Cordillera. The army's march usually began in the early hours of the morning with troops awaken at 4am, formed up at 4:30 and marching by 5 am as the early morning weather was much easier on the troops as the heavy rain and humidity took a heavy toll on them. The Vanguard division eventually reached Morcote on 26 June and on 27 June they marched towards Paya. The rearguard was usually a day's march behind the vanguard. The Vanguard force reached Morcote on the morning of 27 June.

=== Battle of Paya - 27 June ===
On 27 June, as the Patriot Vanguard approached the town of Paya, they spotted the presence of a Spanish Garrison guarding the town. This Spanish garrison of 2 companies which numbered around 300 men was under the command of Sergeant Major Juan Figueroa y Ladron. They were guarding the town because it was along the road that led to the main mountain pass at Labranzagrande. Santander then ordered the troops of the Cazadores Battalion to attack the Spanish force in order to clear the way for the rest of the army. The battle was short, as Figueroa ordered his troops to withdraw towards Labranzagrande when he realized that he was facing a much larger force. During the retreat he ordered his men to cut the bridge towards that town, thinking that it was the intended route for the Patriot Army. That same day 27 July, he wrote a letter to Colonel Barreiro, informing him of the battle.

=== Crossing the Andes ===
With the path cleared, the army continued its march. However that same day 27 June, Bolivar and the rearguard reached Morcote. Doubts began to arise amongst some of the Venezuelan troops and officers (apart from Bolivar) about the feasibility of the campaign, due to the lack of sufficient clothing and supplies for the difficult mountain crossing. Bolivar then convened a war council and sent a letter to Santander informing him of this, recommending that the army try crossing the Andes through Cucuta. Santander then gathered his officers (who were mostly New Granadan like him) to discuss what should be done. He then sent a letter responding to Bolivar, writing that even if the rest of the army did not wish to continue, the Vanguard force would continue the campaign whilst there was the slightest chance of success. Santander also countered Bolívar by saying that crossing the Andes through Cucuta would take far longer and that they would lose their element of surprise, allowing Barreiro to receive reinforcements from Venezuela. The conviction and determination of the New Granadan officers inspired confidence in Bolivar and the Venezuelan officer corps and as a result of this he decided to continue the campaign.

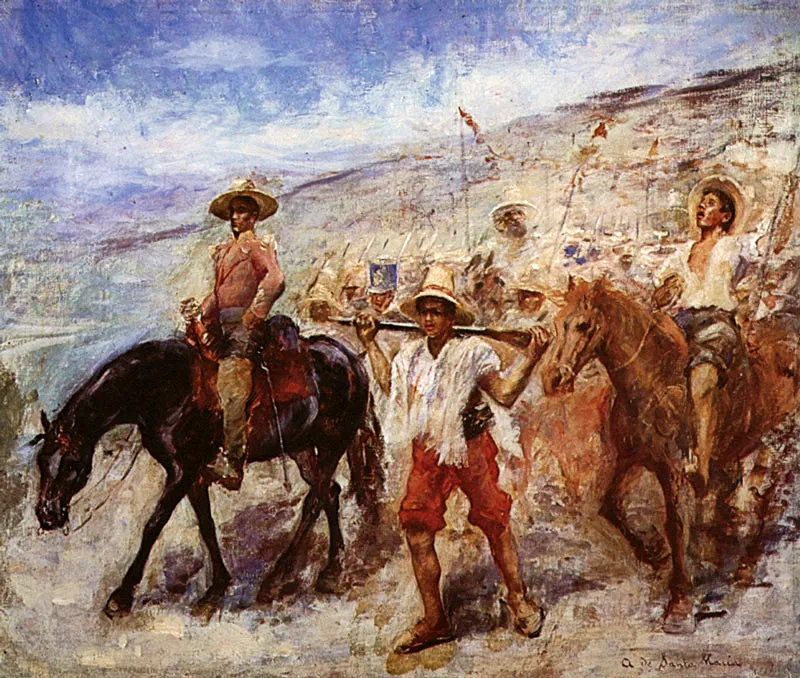
Bolívar's troops ascend the Cordillera Oriental

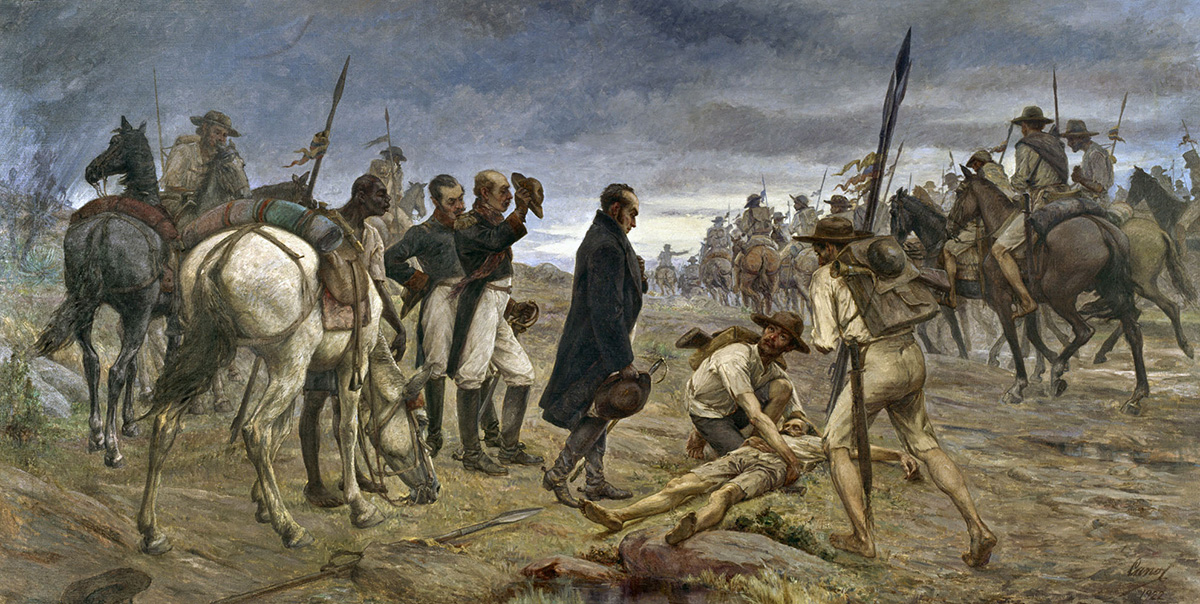
Bolivar crossing the Paramo de Pisba by Francisco Antonio Cano

The army ascended from the flood-swept plains of Venezuela of New Granada into the icy mountain pass of the Páramo de Pisba, which reached an elevation of 3,960 meters (13,000 feet), through the Cordillera Oriental. After wading through a virtual sea, the mostly llanero army was not prepared and poorly clothed for the cold and altitude of the mountains as well as the heavy rainfall they experienced.

The army was split into 3 sections in order to facilitate the crossing with a small force composed of the Cazadores battalion under Colonel Antonio Arredondo crossing first arriving July 3. Santander and the Vanguard division followed suit, both he and Arredondo's units were able to weather the climate better as they were mostly from the Andes. This force arrived in Socha on July 4 and sent back men to assist the struggling Rearguard in their crossing. Anzoategui and the rearguard division began to cross the Paramo on July 5 and had spent the night on the plateau. Bolivar, who was with them, described the crossing: "That same day we entered the Paramo, while the weather was good, the troops suffered a lot from the cold and we lost all beasts of saddle and burden; It has been rare that one would make it." The rearguard suffered heavily during the crossing as their troops were mostly men of the Llanos.

During the night many froze to the death due to the scarcity of vegetation in the area preventing the building of fires for warmth. The rearguard eventually descended on 6 July. General Soublette, who was still in Paya, informed Bolivar that the British Legion would cross on the 13th. During the crossing, 100 men had perished and a number of soldiers had deserted. In Socha, some 500 men were hospitalized and had to be cared for by the townsfolk. Santander commented on the sorry state of the army, stating that "the army was a dying body."

=== Barreiro's reaction ===
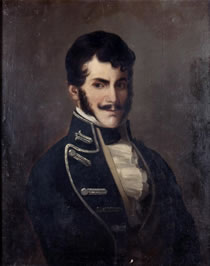
Colonel Jose Maria Barreiro circa 1818

Since June 1819, the Spanish had received intelligence that Bolívar was possibly on the move. However, they doubted that Bolívar's army could make the trip during the rainy season. Barreiro who had been garrisoned in Tunja since May was informed about the reunion of Bolívar and Santander in Tame on June 25 and their intentions of penetrating central New Granada, the same day he informed Viceroy Juan de Sámano of the situation. He then considered several paths through which Bolívar could cross the mountains: La Salina, Paya (Pisba), Pueblo Viejo, Medina, Miraflores, Tenza valley and Cáqueza. He discarded the first four, considering them too difficult and costly in human lives, especially in the winter season. He also ruled out penetration through Cáqueza, because it was located too far to the south. He assumed that Bolívar would choose the one in the Tenza Valley as the most appropriate and sent a number of forces there to guard the pass.

Barreiro soon found himself in a difficult situation: he did not dare to cross the mountain range and attack Bolívar, because he feared opening any other passage for him on a front that extended almost 250 kilometers. Furthermore, he did not see the possibility of maintaining his troops on the other side of the mountains, practically cut off from Tunja and the capital. He therefore chose to wait, while alarming and contradictory reports began to arrive such as one that informed that Bolívar was going to meet Páez in Píedecuesta. He tried to gather, as far as the security of the Kingdom allowed, several detachments of his army, who had been stationed at widely dispersed points.

Finally, on July 5 he received news that 500 cattle were led from Paya to Pisba and on the 6th, that the enemy army had moved towards the moor towards Pisba and Socotá, confirming that the Patriots had taken the route through the Páramo de Pisba. When Bolívar arrived in Socha on July 6 his army was in a weakened state and at its most vulnerable, however Barreiro preferred to stay garrisoned in Tunja in order to concentrate his forces that had been dispersed throughout the province. Viceroy Sámano grew frustrated with this approach and decided to relieve Barreiro of his command and replace him with Colonel Sebastian de la Calzada, who was commander of the 400 strong European Aragon Battalion which guarded Santa Fe, as commander of the III Division dispatching him to Tunja at once. Barreiro however refused to obey this order as it would "Stain his honor as a military officer" and also told the Viceroy that only General Pablo Morillo had the authority to relieve him of his command, as a result he ordered de la Calzada to return to Santa Fe.

During this time Bolívar remained near Socha as he began to rebuild his weakened army, this was aided with the support of the local people of the Tunja Province (modern day: Boyacá Department) who sewed uniforms, provided men for the army, as well as horses to replace the losses suffered during the crossing of the Paramo. The support of the local people for the Patriot Army had been noted by Royalist officials, with Barreiro complaining about this in his communications with Viceroy Samano. While the bulk of the army rested for 4 days in Socha, Bolívar ordered Santander's Vanguard force to take control of the nearby towns of Corrales and Gámeza, Gámeza in particular was important strategically as there was a bridge there that crosses the Gameza river which was swollen during this time of year. On July 7 this vanguard force engaged in small skirmishes with patrolling Royalist squads dispatched from Sogamoso by the local Spanish commander Lieutenant Colonel Francisco Gonzalez. As reports of the Patriot troops taking nearby towns reached Gonzalez he decided to fall back from Sogamoso towards Tunja.

=== Corrales and Gameza - 10 July ===
On July 8, Barreiro after hearing about the Patriot presence near Corrales and Gameza finally moved his army in the direction towards Sogamoso where he was joined by Gonzalez, arriving there on the night of July 9. The next morning July 10 he ordered his troops to conduct a reconnaissance sweep in the area of the towns of Corrales and Gameza. In the direction of Corrales he dispatched 30 men under the command of Lieutenant Manuel Gutierrez and to Gameza a company of grenadiers of the King's 1st Battalion as well as some dragoons numbering 200. Lieutenant Gutierrez's troops who were near Corrales encountered 20 Patriot Cavalry, Gutierrez ordered his men to chase after them where they were subsequently ambushed by 300 Patriots under the command of Colonel Justo Briceño who were hiding in nearby buildings, as a result of this action the Royalist squad was decimated with only Gutierrez and 4 dragoons managing to escape, the force that had been deployed to Gameza was also forced to withdraw.

As a result of these circumstances Barreiro advanced along the banks of the Chicamocha River setting his headquarters in a place known as Topaga Mills, once there he sent reinforcements in order to support his forces near Corrales and Gameza. These reinforcements pushed back the Patriot advances, with the Patriot Cavalry being chased down by Spanish forces past the town of Corrales where they were forced to throw themselves into the river in order to escape. As a result of these skirmishes Spanish casualties were 20 men dead and 5 captured, meanwhile the Patriot infantry was almost entirely wiped out. With this Barreiro achieved a partial victory of which he informed the Viceroy about in his letter. The Spanish also captured a large group of Patriot troops who were unable to retreat across the swollen river, these prisoners were tied up in a group and executed by bayonet on the orders of Barreiro to conserve ammunition.

=== Gameza Bridge - 11 July ===
After the battle of Corrales, on July 11 Barreiro deployed around 900 infantry and 180 cavalry to take Gameza bridge, this force marched on the morning of July 11 from Molinos de Topaga. The Spanish vanguard force was dispatched ahead and crossed the bridge over the Gámeza River and continued the ascent of the slope where the town is located.

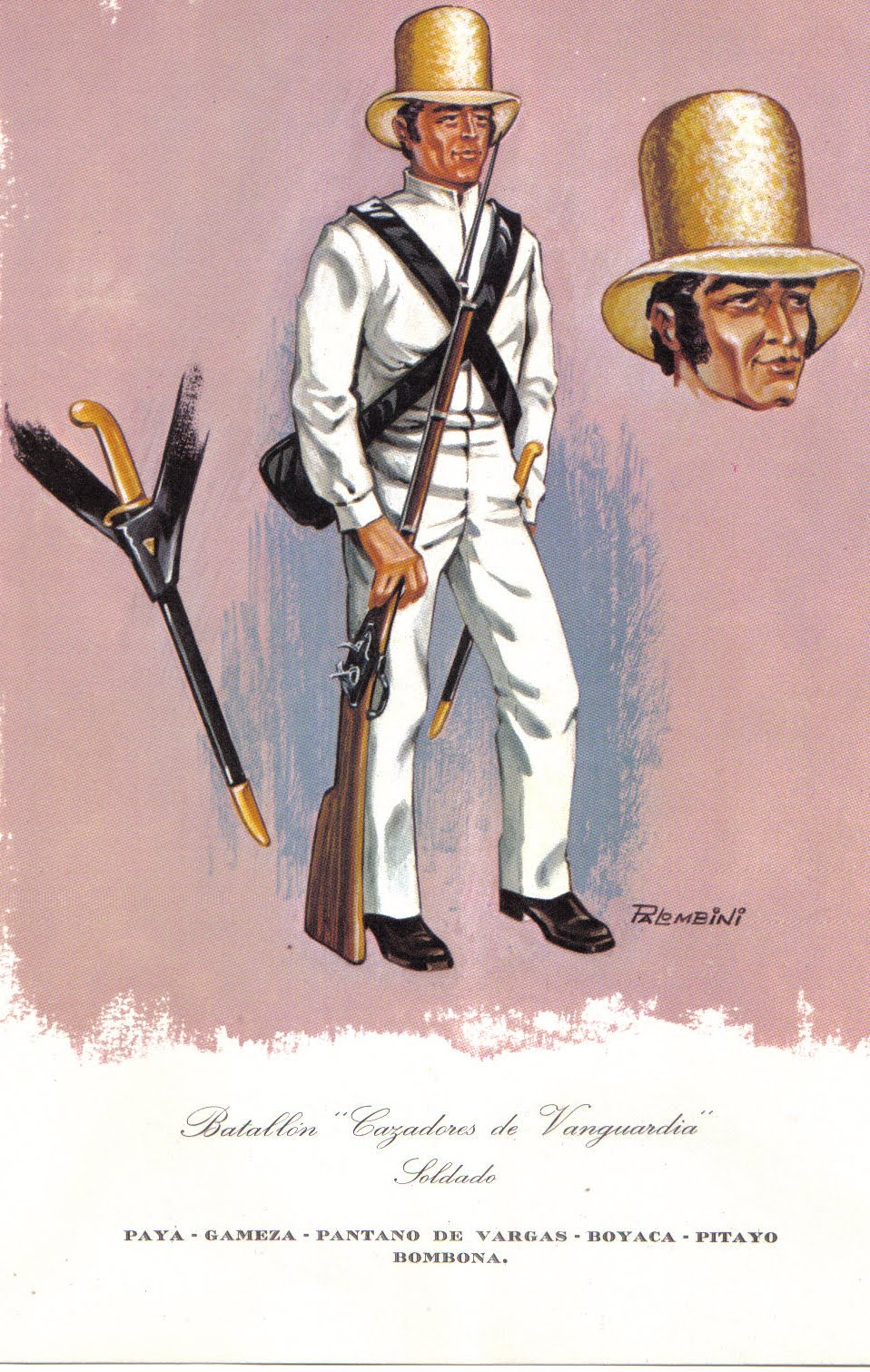
The uniform of a Patriot Soldier of the Cazadores Constantes de la Nueva Granada infantry battalion

Barreiro, who was marching at the head of the main group, observed when he arrived near the bridge that a column was coming from the top of the mountain, above the town. He immediately ordered the Numancia battalion to halt their positions. He then saw that the other columns were coming down, apparently to attack the royalist force. He estimated the enemy at 2,000 infantry and 150 cavalry divided into five columns. These forces were the vanguard and rearguard divisions of Santander and Anzoátegui, that is, the entire Patriot Army.

Barreiro considering that the Numancia battalion could be cut off from retreating along the river, ordered its unit commander, Lieutenant Colonel Juan Tolrá, to withdraw his battalion to the left bank, that is, behind the bridge, taking into account the direction of the river. Bolivar saw this movement, and ordered the Cazadores Battalion as well as a company from each of the Rifles, Barcelona and Bravos of Páez battalions to charge the royalists.

This led both the patriots and royalists, to take defensive positions on both sides of the river with both attempting to cross each others sides various times to no avail, the battle lasted between 5 and 8 hours with neither able to cross both armies withdrew to their previous positions. As a result of the battle the Patriots suffered 180 casualties with Santander himself being lightly wounded as well as Colonel Antonio Arriendo being mortally wounded and dying a few days later, leading to his second in command Joaquin Paris being promoted to Lieutenant Colonel and being given command of the Cazadores Battalion.

The Royalists suffered 74 casualties, during the encounter both sides expended a large amount of ammunition with the Spanish having expended some 35,000 Paper cartridges (39 rounds per soldier) forcing Barreiro to urgently request more ammunition from the Viceroy.

=== Vargas Swamp - 25 July ===
After the results of the Battle of Gameza, Bolivar changed his strategy disregarding his initial plan for a frontal assault on Sogamoso and instead opting for a flanking maneuver through Cerinza Valley. By July 18 Bolivar was in Belen de Cerinza, the next day they reached Santa Rosa, and on July 20 the bulk of the army reached Duitama and camped there while the Vanguard took up positions in an area known as Bonza. This movement caused Barreiro to fall back towards the town of Paipa where he hoped to intercept him.

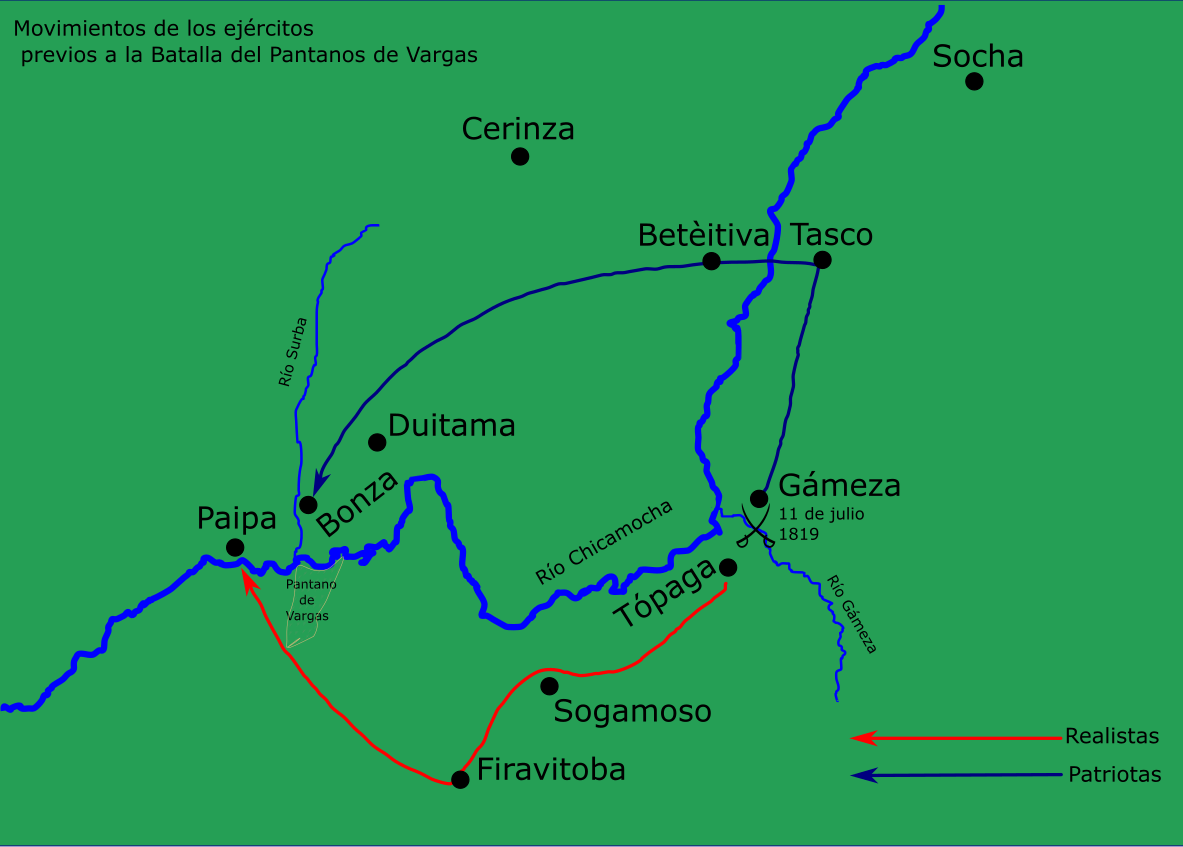
The movements of both armies from July 12 to July 20

By 22 July the British Legion had finally crossed Páramo de Pisba and rejoined the army, the Patriot army now numbered around 2,400 men. Bolivar now at full strength, still aimed to reach the capital Santa Fe through the main Camino Real, however he would need to cross the swollen Chicamocha River in order to do this. On 23 July the Patriot army began building rafts to ford the river, these would be completed by late 24 July. On the early hours of July 25 the Patriot Army attempted to cross the Chicamocha River near an area called Puente de Balsa, this crossing would be complicated by the collapse of some of the rafts which delayed the army significantly.

This delay was noticed by royalist spies in the vicinity who informed Barreiro of this, Barreiro camped in Paipa now knew Bolivar intended to take the road from Salitre and Paipa. The Royalist Army was able to muster 1,800 men as some of troops from the surrounding areas finally rejoined the bulk of the army. Barreiro moved quickly to place his troops on favorable ground on top of Picacho and Cangrejo hills in an area near Vargas Swamp that served as a chokepoint between the Salitre to Paipa road arriving there at 11am. The Patriot Army arrived at 12pm and immediately did battle with the Royalist Army.

The Battle of Vargas Swamp lasted 5 hours as the Patriot Army tried repeatedly to dislodge Spanish forces from their positions on Picacho Hill, Cangrejo Hill, and the main road that bordered the swamp. Time and time again the Royalists were able to hold off and push back the Patriots. Around 5pm the Patriots began to fall back in disarray, seeing this Barreiro committed his reserve infantry and cavalry for a frontal assault in tandem with a flanking maneuver in order to encircle the patriots to finish them off. Bolivar in an act of desperation committed his reserve cavalry under the command of Colonel Juan José Rondón who led an uphill charge with 14 lancers that managed to penetrate the Spanish line on Cangrejo Hill. Rondón's charge caught the Spanish off guard and inflicted heavy casualties on the Spanish reserve infantry. Lt. Colonel Lucas Carvajal also charged with his cavalry squadron in support of Rondón, concentrating his attack on the main road where Hussars of Ferdinand VII had been advancing along.

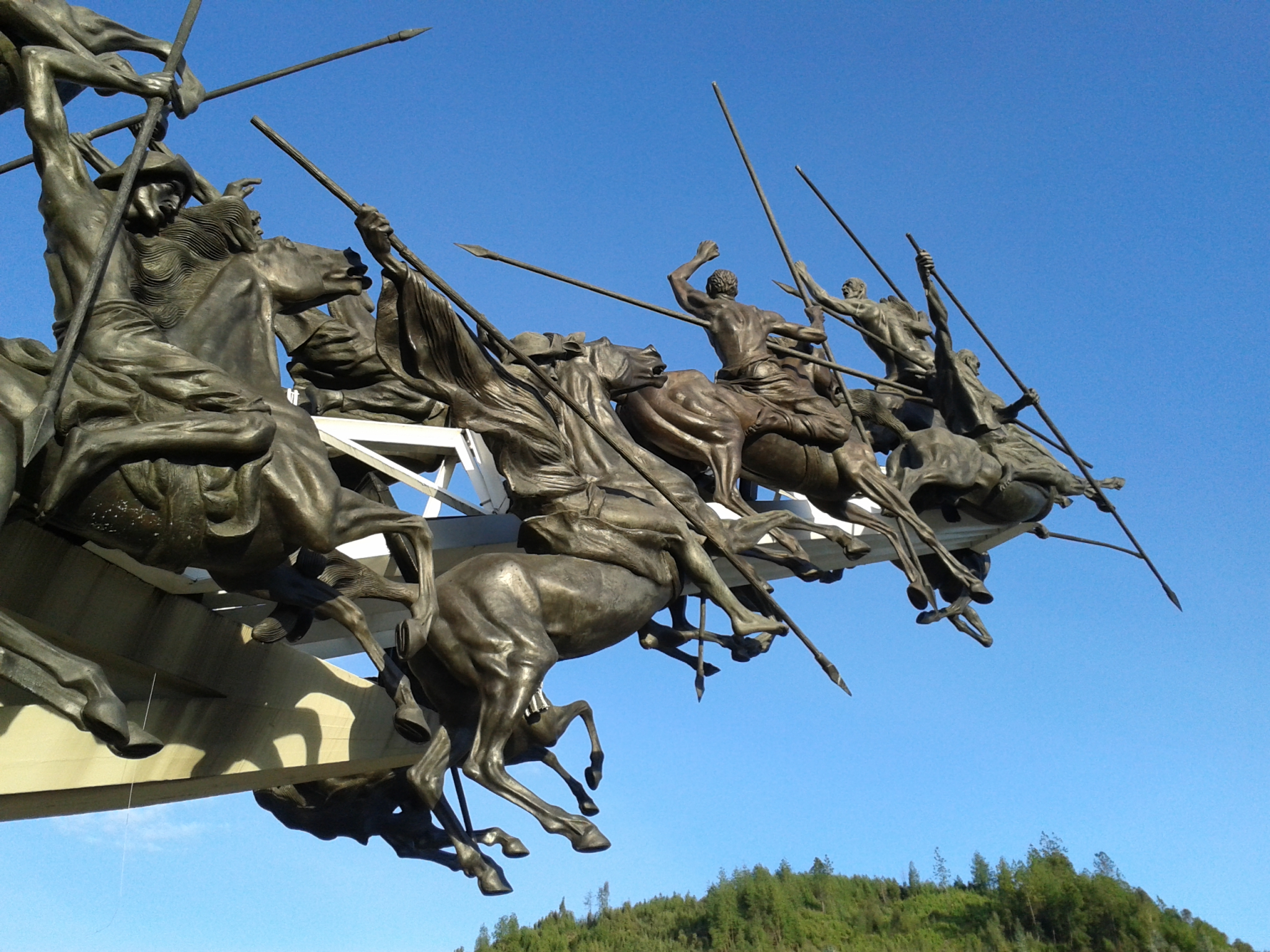
Close up of the Vargas Swamp Lancers Monument, built on the site of the Battlefield

. At the same time Santander's Vanguard force along with the British Legion under Rooke, led a renewed bayonet charge up Picacho Hill which dislodged the Spanish forces there as well, however Rooke would be mortally wounded as a result of the charge dying a few days later. While the Royalists had been pushed back, their forces were mostly intact and were able to avoid further destruction thanks to a tropical rainstorm that covered their withdrawal towards Paipa.

The Patriot army withdrew to the Chicamocha River. This uphill battle for Bolivar was a close victory, however it was ultimately indecisive as neither side was able to decimate the other. Both armies suffered heavy loses as a result, with Barreiro suffering around 400-500 dead and Bolivar 300 dead as well numerous wounded. Barreiro in his letter to the Viceroy informed him that it was the Royalist Army that triumphed at Vargas swamp but that the tropical storm had prevented it from crushing the Patriots.

=== Boyacá - 7 August ===
Map showing the route that both armies took to reach Boyaca Bridge.

After the Battle of Vargas Swamp, the losses suffered by Bolivar's army had left the army nonoperational, to remedy this he decreed martial law in the area on 28 July and conscripted all men from the ages 14 to 60 to rebuild his force. The Patriot Army rested until August 3, when Bolivar ordered a return to Venezuela retreating across the Chicamocha River which was observed by Barreiro's forces. This was feint however, as during the night, he redirected his forces and crossed the river again and marched towards Tunja taking the alternate way through the Toca Road. The Patriot Army took the city by mid-day of 5 August 1819, in the city the Patriots were able to capture 600 muskets as well as uniforms, blankets and other important supplies.

Barreiro was not aware of this until August 5, and marched his army down the Camino Real de Santa Fe in the direction of Tunja, where he was joined by Royalist reinforcements under the command of Colonel Juan Loño who had been sent by the Viceroy, who provided him with munitions as well as 3 cannon that he had so requested from the Viceroy. Barreiro continued his march towards Tunja and was informed of its capture by passersby, with Tunja captured his defensive strategy had failed and he was now obliged to mobilize his troops to cut Bolivar's advance defend the capital, Santafé.

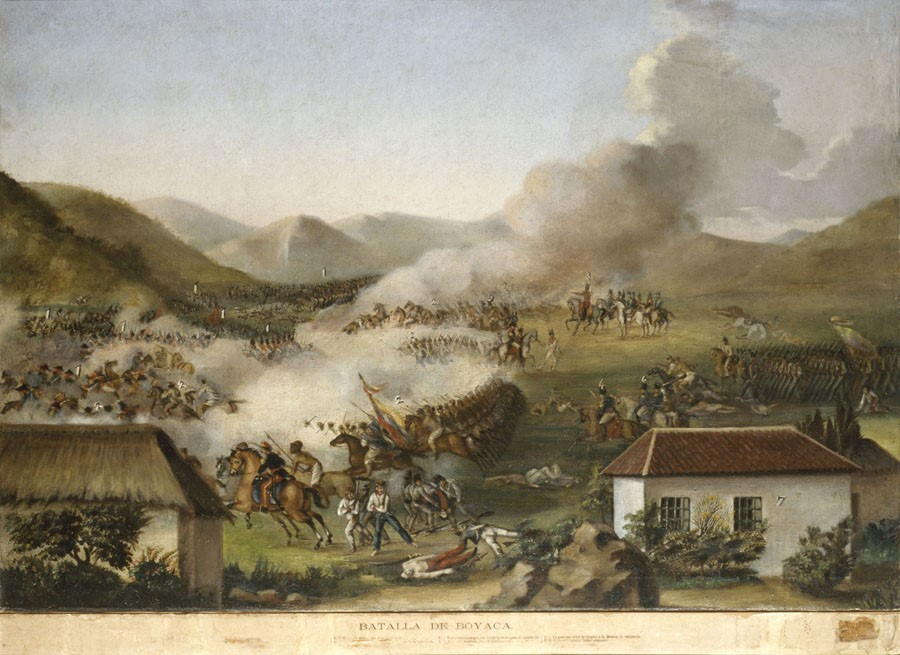
the Battle of Boyacá by José María Espinosa (1840)

Barreiro now needed take the fastest route to Santa Fe, he hoped to fool the Patriots by conducting a night march in the rain around Tunja through the towns of Combita and Motavita, the arduous march was conducted the same day August 5 with the Royalist Army arriving in Motavita during the early hours of August 6. the Royalists believed they had moved undetected. Taking Motavita was important as it sat at an elevation of 3.200 meters allowing the Royalists to observe Tunja from its heights.

On the early hours of August 7, the Royalist Army, now with some 2,670 troops, continued their march to Santa Fe. In order to rejoin the main Camino Real that led to Santa Fe the Royalist troops would have to march some 45 km from Motavita through the Samaca Road that rejoined the main Camino Real at the Boyaca Bridge which crossed the overflowing Teatinos River. Barreiro then split his army in two, sending a vanguard force to hold the bridge and wait until the rest of the army caught up.

Unbeknownst to Barreiro, was that spies had informed the Patriots of the Royalist Army's march to Motavita, Bolivar on the morning of August 7 observed Barreiro's march in the direction of Boyaca Bridge from the San Lazaro Heights near Tunja. At 9am he ordered Santander and Anzoategui to intercept Barreiro at the Boyaca Bridge. The Patriot Army mustered some 2,850 troops, and marched down the Camino Real from Tunja and successfully intercepted Barreiro at the Boyaca Bridge around 2 in the afternoon.

The Battle of Boyacá was the decisive culmination of the campaign, as the Patriot Army successfully divided and defeated the 2,670 royalist soldiers in a battle that lasted two hours. Santander pinned down the Spanish Vanguard by the bridge while Anzoategui led his infantry and cavalry into the heart of Barreiro's rearguard. The battle resulted in 66 Patriot casualties, 250 Royalist casualties, as well as the capture of approximately 1,600 of the remaining troops of the III Division. Colonel Barreiro was also captured himself alongside 37 of his officers. The III Division was effectively dismantled at the Battle of Boyaca with only a small group of soldiers and officers, the most notable being Barreiro's chief-of-staff Colonel Sebastian Diaz, who were able to flee and avoid being captured or killed.

== Aftermath ==
News of the Royalist Army's defeat at the Battle of Boyacá reached Santa Fe on the night of August 8, Viceroy Juan José de Sámano was shocked at the news as his last communications with Barreiro had been his supposed victory over the Patriots at Vargas Swamp. Samano and the rest of royalist government fled the capital in the direction of Honda where they would take the Magdalena River up to Cartagena de Indias the very next morning, leaving behind the treasury. The 400 troops belonging to the Aragon Battalion under the command of Colonel Sebastian de la Calzada also left the capital in the direction towards Popayan but not before destroying the gunpowder supply in the city.

On the afternoon of 10 August Bolívar's army entered Santa Fe without any royalist resistance. His arrival concluded the campaign for liberating New Granada. The battle of Boyacá was a decisive triumph over Spanish power in New Granada, and the Spanish America as a whole. Despite the royalists' strength in the other provinces of the region, such as Santa Marta and Pasto – where resistance withstood various years of revolutionary uprisings – the capital of the viceroyalty of New Granada had fallen into the hands of the Patriots.

== Political ramifications ==
With New Granada secure, Bolívar returned to Venezuela in a position of unprecedented military, political and financial strength. In his absence, the Congress had flirted with deposing him, assuming that he would meet his death in New Granada. The vice-president Francisco Antonio Zea was deposed and replaced by Juan Bautista Arismendi. All this was quickly reversed when word got to the Congress of Bolívar's success. In December Bolívar returned to Angostura, where he urged the Congress to proclaim the creation of a new state: the Republic of Colombia (Gran Colombia). It did so on 17 December and elected him president of the new country. Since two of its three regions, Venezuela and Quito (Ecuador), were still under royalist control, it was only a limited achievement. Bolívar continued his efforts against the royalist areas of Venezuela, culminating in the Battle of Carabobo two years later, which all but secured his control of northern South America. Bolívar's victory in New Granada was, therefore, a major turning point in the history of northern South America. With this shift in political power, the path was laid out for the union of New Granada and Venezuela into the Republic of Colombia. However, the campaigns for independence would continue: Antonio José de Sucre marched South, towards Pasto, the Audiencia de Quito, the Viceroyalty of Peru, and Upper Peru, while Bolivar sought to expand the campaign to the westernmost regions of Venezuela, which still lay under Spanish power, and counted with 27,000 soldiers for its defense.

== See also ==
- United Provinces of New Granada
- Spanish reconquest of New Granada
- Military career of Simón Bolívar
- Gran Colombia
