= James Rooke =

James Rooke or Rook may refer to:

- James Rooke (British Army general) (1742–1805), English general and politician
- James Rooke (British Legion officer) (1770–1819), British soldier in the Napoleonic wars
- James Rook (rowing) (born 1997), Australian rowing coxswain
- Nightmaster (James "Jim" Rook), a fictional character by DC Comics
