= James Towers English =

James Towers English (22 February 1782 – 26 September 1819) was an Anglo-Irish commander of British Legions forces in the Spanish American wars of independence.

== Biography ==
James Towers English was the son of a well-to-do Dublin merchant. He went into business supplying horses to the British Army until his company went bankrupt, then took a job with the army Commissariat as a clerk. In May 1817 he met Luis López Méndez, the representative of Simon Bolívar in London. Claiming to have been a cavalry lieutenant, he was made a captain in the '1st Venezuelan Hussars' and sailed for South America in December 1817. He fought with distinction at the battle of Ortiz on 26 March 1818, and was promoted to full colonel and appointed second-in-command of the British Guard of Honor led by James Rooke.

In May 1818, he signed a contract with the Patriot government to recruit and equip a British force of 1,000 men, in return for which he was promised £50 per head and a General's commission. By painting a rosy picture of pay and conditions in South America, he succeeded in recruiting between 1,000 and 2,000 mercenaries, who sailed during the following months. English returned to Venezuela and landed on Margarita Island in mid-April, 1819 where he was confirmed in the rank of Brigadier General and was given command of all the foreign mercenaries, as subordinate to Venezuelan General Rafael Urdaneta.

In July 1819 he participated in storming the fortress of El Morro, which guarded the city Barcelona. His troops looted the city, drank all the alcohol they could find and devastated their section of the town. On August 7 1819 Urdaneta's army attempted to storm Maturín but failed after grievous losses in their assault against Fort Agua Santa, while General English remained in the rear pleading sickness. With his authority destroyed, English was replaced as leader of the British Legion by Colonel John Blossett. English retired to Margarita Island where he died of illness on 26 September 1819 and is buried in a cemetery overlooking Juan Griego Bay. His wife, Mary, remained in Colombia and married the English trader William Greenup.
