= Luis López Méndez =

Venezuelan lawyer and diplomat

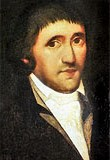
Luis López Méndez before 1831

Luis López Méndez (August 1758 – 1841) was a Venezuelan ambassador who supported the cause of Venezuelan independence by purchasing military equipment and recruiting the British Legions. His recruitments were critical to winning the war, leading Simón Bolívar to call him the true Libertador, rather than himself. Later, his illegal, spendthrift purchases were credited with causing a debt crisis in Colombia.

== Personal life ==
López Méndez was born in August 1758. He studied at the University of Caracas, graduating with a degree in philosophy in 1777. He first married Francisca Dacosta Romero, and later married Maria Rodriguez y Miranda, the niece of Francisco de Miranda.

== Career ==
In 1797, he was elected mayor of Caracas. In 1810, he embraced the Patriot cause. That year, he was sent to London as part of a mission headed by Simón Bolívar, with himself as the most experienced member, and Andrés Bello as secretary. Their ship was accompanied by the Spanish vessel Castilla, whose captain was oblivious that he was protecting rebel diplomats. Representing the Supreme Junta to the British government, they secured an unofficial meeting with Marquess Wellesley. The British were unwilling to directly support the cause, as Spain was a co-belligerent against the French Empire, however, they received a guarantee that they would not be invaded by the French, and were told that ports in the British West Indies would allow Venezuelan ships to trade. Marquess Wellesley also offered to mediate a peace; the offer was declined. The ambassadors also went to the home of Francisco de Miranda at 27 Grafton Street and convinced him to return to a leading role in the movement. They joined, along with other Patriots in London, the society Miranda organized out of his home called the Great American Reunion.

After this, Bolívar returned home while López Méndez and Bello remained in London. López Méndez began promoting the cause of Latin American independence in Britain, succeeding in making it more popular than the Spanish cause there. In 1817, he was given plenipotentiary powers on behalf of the new Republic of Venezuela by Bolívar, who requested that Méndez send materiel, uniforms, and British sergeants and officers to populate the army. That year, he contracted commercial vessels Hero and Hunter to supply the Patriot military. He also began to form what would be called the British Legions from recruits, including adventurers, ideologically motivated men, men out of work, and mainly veterans of the Napoleonic Wars. That year, he personally hired officers like Gustavus Hippisley and Henry Wilson. Because of the purchases being made on credit, he was repeatedly sent to debtors' prison. His contributions to the Patriot cause, which was greatly helped in 1819 by the recruits, led Bolívar to say that Méndez was the true liberator of the Americas, rather than he.

In 1820, after the Republic of Venezuela became part of Colombia, López Méndez was dismissed in his role as plenipotentiary ambassador in favor of Francisco Antonio Zea. However, López Méndez refused to step down or recognize the authority of Zea. He continued to make purchases on behalf of the government, including a purchase of equipment for 10,000 soldiers at an overpriced rate. After Zea's death in 1822, his replacement, José Rafael Revenga was arrested and temporarily held because of Colombia's failure to pay the debts accrued by Méndez. Both he and Zea had found that Colombia was considered by financiers in London to be in debt with very poor credit. He and Revenga both had their powers revoked in 1823. Méndez had already been given a new assignment. In 1822 he was made ambassador to France, the Netherlands, and the (former) Hanseatic cities, to be given plenipotentiary powers if they established relations with Colombia.

== Return to the Americas ==
In 1826 he returned to the Americas. He wrote from Lima to Bolívar in 1826 complaining about the poor situation he had found himself in. In 1827 he joined a conspiracy led by José María Bustamante to revolt and oppose the 1826 Bolivian Constitution. He traveled to Guayaquil, but a mutiny led by José Ramón Bravo prevented the conspiracy. He and the conspirators were arrested, and Méndez was sent to Bogotá. After that, he went to Chile, where he lived until his death in 1841.

== Bibliography ==
- Dawson, Frank Griffth (1990). The First Latin American Debt Crisis: The City of London and the 1822–25 Loan Bubble. Yale University Press. ISBN 978-0-300-04727-1.
- Peña Martínez, José A. (2023). Heroes En Uniforme, Indumentaria militar en la Guerra de Independencia de Venezuela (1810-1823). ISBN 978-980-419-100-8.
- Arana, Marie (9 April 2013). Bolivar: American Liberator. Simon and Schuster. ISBN 978-1-4391-2495-6.
- Masur, Gerhard (1948). Simon Bolivar. Literary Licensing, LLC. ISBN 978-1-258-91499-8.
