= Venezuelan War of Independence =

Conflict between the Spanish Empire and its Venezuelan colonies (1810-23)

- Part of Spanish American wars of independence
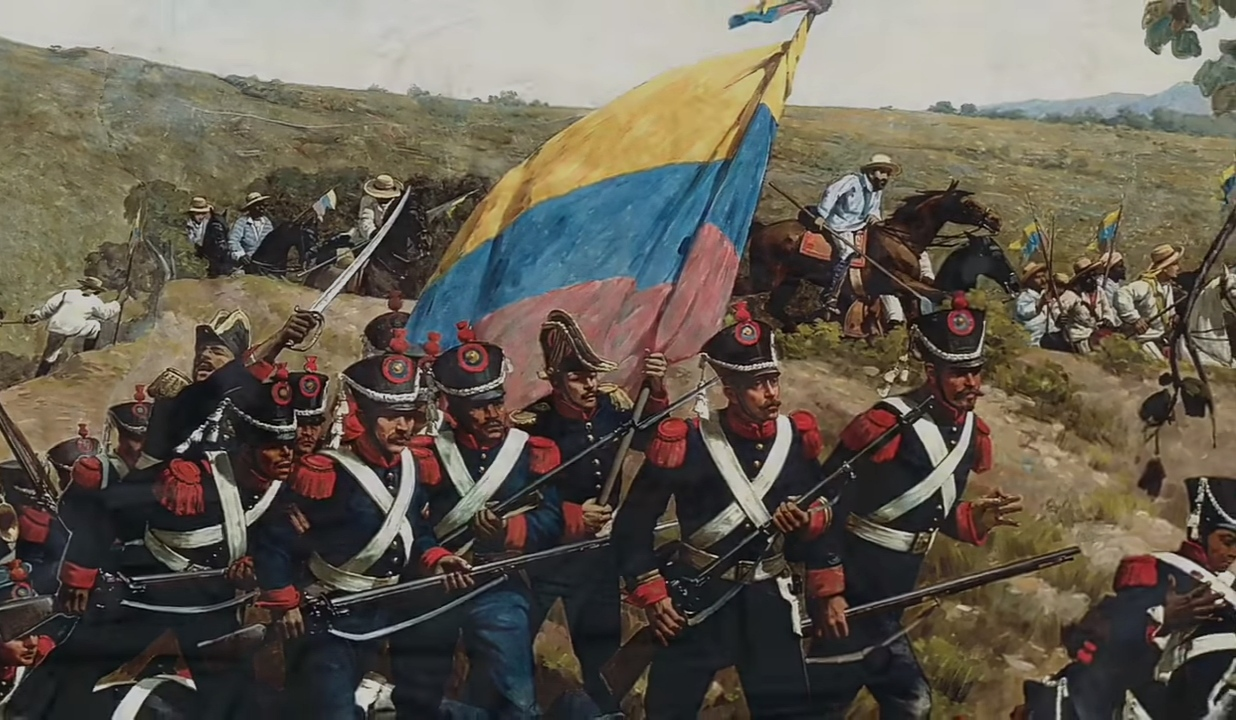
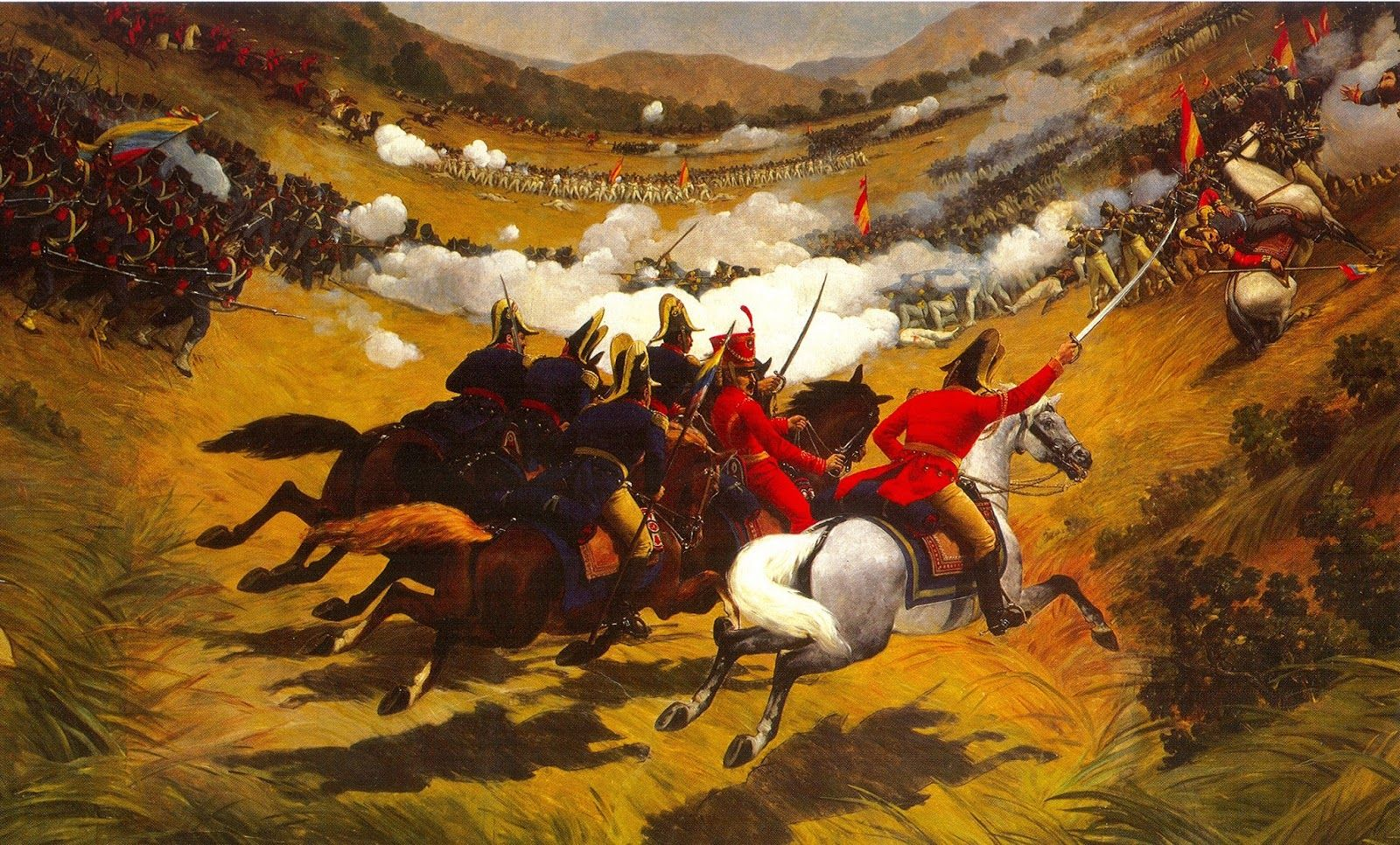
- La Batalla de Carabobo, Martín Tovar y Tovar
Date	19 April 1810 – 24 July 1823 (13 years, 3 months and 5 days)
Location	Venezuela and New Granada
Result	Patriot and Colombian victory: Military outcomes; Defeat of the principal Spanish royalist armies in Venezuela.; Liberation of much of Venezuela following the Battle of Carabobo (1821).; Republican naval victory at the Battle of Lake Maracaibo (1823), followed by the capitulation of the royalist forces in Maracaibo.; Capture of Puerto Cabello (1823), ending the last major Spanish royalist stronghold in Venezuela.; Political and constitutional outcomes; Declaration of Venezuelan independence by the First National Congress of Venezuela (5 July 1811).; Establishment of successive Venezuelan republican governments during the independence struggle.; Proclamation of the Republic of Colombia by the Congress of Angostura (17 December 1819), providing for the union of Venezuela and New Granada.; Ratification of the union of Venezuela and New Granada by the Congress of Cúcuta (1821).; Adoption of the Constitution of Cúcuta (1821), establishing the constitutional institutions of the Republic of Colombia.; Territorial outcomes; End of effective Spanish royalist control over mainland Venezuela.; Incorporation of the former Captaincy General of Venezuela into the Republic of Colombia, organized into constituent departments.; Wider consequences; Consolidation of republican control in northern South America.; Participation of Venezuelan and New Granadan forces within the Colombian armies in subsequent campaigns for the liberation of Quito and Peru.
Territorial changes	Independence of the Captaincy General of Venezuela; Venezuela becomes a part of Gran Colombia

Belligerents
Early republican governments (1810–1812); Supreme Junta of Caracas (1810–1811); First Republic of Venezuela (1811–1812); New Granadan intervention and Second Republic (1813–1814); United Provinces of New Granada; Free State of Cartagena; Second Republic of Venezuela (1813–1814); Republican resistance and reconquest (1814–1816); United Provinces of New Granada (until 1816); Venezuelan republican remnants and expeditionary forces; Free State of Cartagena (until 1815); Republican reorganization (1816–1819); Third Republic of Venezuela (1817–1819); New Granadan republican forces in Casanare and the Llanos; Republican armies in Guayana, Apure and the Orinoco region; Republic of Colombia (1819–1823); Republic of Colombia (1819–1821); Republic of Colombia (1821–1823); Foreign assistance; Republic of Haiti (1816; arms, supplies and expeditionary assistance); British Legions (foreign volunteers serving in republican armies)	Royalists; Kingdom of Spain and the Indies (the Spains); Early royalist resistance (1810–1812); Captaincy General of Venezuela; Royalist authorities in Coro; Royalist Maracaibo Province; Royalist Guayana Province; Spanish royalist forces based in Puerto Rico; Royalist restoration and civil war (1812–1814); Captaincy General of Venezuela; Royalist forces of Domingo de Monteverde; Royalist llanero forces of José Tomás Boves; Royalist forces of Francisco Tomás Morales; Spanish reconquest and royalist administration (1815–1818); Captaincy General of Venezuela; Pablo Morillo's expeditionary army; Royalist forces in the Viceroyalty of New Granada; Royalist garrisons of Caracas, Cumaná and Puerto Cabello; Royalist campaigns and territorial retreat (1819–1821); Captaincy General of Venezuela; Royalist forces in Maracaibo, Coro and Cumaná; Royalist garrison of Puerto Cabello; Spanish royalist naval forces; Final royalist resistance (1821–1823); Royalist forces of Miguel de la Torre; Royalist forces of Francisco Tomás Morales; Royalist forces in Maracaibo and Coro; Royalist garrison of Puerto Cabello (until November 1823); Spanish naval forces under Ángel Laborde

Commanders and leaders
Simón Bolívar (Commander-in-Chief); Early republican leadership (1810–1812); Francisco de Miranda; Cristóbal Mendoza; Francisco Espejo; Juan Germán Roscio; New Granadan intervention and Second Republic (1813–1814); Atanasio Girardot †; José Félix Ribas (executed); Santiago Mariño; Antonio Ricaurte †; Rafael Urdaneta; José Francisco Bermúdez; Vicente Campo Elías; Jacinto Lara; José Tadeo Monagas; Francisco de Asís Mejía; Manuel del Castillo y Rada; Hermógenes Maza; Luciano D'Elhuyar; José María Ortega Nariño; Francisco de Paula Vélez; Manuel París Ricaurte; Antonio París Ricaurte; José María Ricaurte; Joaquín Ricaurte; Tomás Gutiérrez; Luis Lamprea; Pedro Briceño Méndez; Republican resistance and reconquest (1814–1816); Juan Bautista Arismendi; José Francisco Bermúdez; Francisco Esteban Gómez; Gregor MacGregor; Republican reorganization (1816–1819); José Antonio Páez; Manuel Piar (executed); José Antonio Anzoátegui; Francisco de Paula Santander; José Maria Vergara y Lozano; Manuel Cedeño †; Carlos Soublette; Luis Brión; Francisco Esteban Gómez; Juan Bautista Arismendi; Republic of Colombia and final campaigns (1819–1823); Antonio José de Sucre; José Prudencio Padilla; José María Córdova; Ambrosio Plaza †; Joaquín París Ricaurte; Daniel Florencio O'Leary; Carlos Soublette; Jacinto Lara	(Spanish Empire) Ferdinand VII (King of Spain from 1813): (Spain) Vicente Emparan; (Spain) Pablo Morillo; (Spain) Miguel de la Torre; (Spain) José Boves †; (Spain) Francisco Morales; (Spain) Fernando Miyares; (Spain) D. de Monteverde; (Spain) José Ceballos; (Spain) Juan Cajigal; (Spain) Eusebio Antoñanzas; (Spain) Juan Vargas (surrendered); (Spain) Francisco Rosete †; (Spain) Isidro Valdés; (Spain) Ramón Correa; (Spain) Ángel Laborde; (Spain) S. de la Calzada; (Spain) José María Barreiro; (Spain) Juan de Sámano; (Spain) Francisco Montalvo y Ambulodi; (Spain) Antonio Tiscar y Pedrosa

Casualties and losses
- 250,000–500,000 dead

The Venezuelan War of Independence (Spanish: Guerra de Independencia de Venezuela, 1810–1823) was one of the Spanish American wars of independence of the early nineteenth century, when independence movements in South America fought a civil war for secession and against unity of the Spanish Empire, emboldened by Spain's troubles in the Napoleonic Wars.

The establishment of the Supreme Caracas Junta following the forced deposition of Vicente Emparan as Captain General of the Captaincy General of Venezuela on 19 April 1810, marked the beginnings of the war. On 5 July 1811, seven of the ten provinces of the Captaincy General of Venezuela declared their independence in the Venezuelan Declaration of Independence. The First Republic of Venezuela was lost in 1812 following the 1812 Caracas earthquake and the 1812 Battle of La Victoria. Under the authority, resources and army of the New Granadan government, Simón Bolívar commanded the Admirable Campaign of 1813 to retake and liberate Venezuela, establishing the Second Republic of Venezuela in 1813; but this too did not last, falling to a combination of a local uprising and Spanish royalist reconquest of New Granada. Only as part of Bolívar's campaign to liberate New Granada in 1819-20 did Venezuela achieve a lasting independence from Spain (initially as part of Gran Colombia).

Following the liberation campaign of New Granada and the republican victory at the Battle of Boyacá in august 1819, New Granada became an important military and political base for the continuation of the independence struggle in northern South America. On 17 December 1819, the Congress of Angostura, convened as the Congress of Venezuela, adpoted the Fundamental Law of the Republic of Venezuela proclaiming the union of Venezuela and New Granada under the name Republic of Colombia. The union was subsequently ratified in Bogotá 1820 and later by representatives of both New Granada and Venezuela at the Congress of Cúcuta on 12 July 1821. The congress also adopted the Colombian Constitution of 1821 on 30 august 1821, establishing the constitutional framework of the new republic.

== First Republic (1810–1812) ==
The French invasion of Spain in 1808 led to the fall of the Spanish Monarchy. Most subjects of Spain did not accept the government of Joseph Bonaparte, placed on the Spanish throne by his brother, Emperor Napoleon Bonaparte of France. At the same time, the process of creating a stable government in Spain, which would be widely recognized throughout the empire, took two years. (See Junta (Peninsular War).) This created a power vacuum in the Spanish possessions in America, which created further political uncertainty. On April 19, 1810 the municipal council of Caracas headed a successful movement to depose the Spanish Governor and Captain-General, Vicente Emparán. A junta was established in Caracas, and soon other Venezuelan provinces followed suit. The reverberations of this act of independence could be felt throughout Venezuela almost immediately. Across Venezuela, towns and cities decided to either side with the movement based in Caracas or not, and de facto civil war ensued throughout much of Venezuela. The Caracas Junta called for a congress of Venezuelan provinces to establish a government for the region. Initially, both the Junta and Congress upheld the "rights of Ferdinand VII," meaning that they recognized themselves to still be part of the Spanish Monarchy, but had established a separate government due to the French invasion of the Iberian Peninsula. As Congress deliberated, a faction proposing outright independence quickly won favor. Persons such as Francisco de Miranda, a long-term Venezuelan expatriate, and Simón Bolívar, a young, Criollo aristocrat—both influenced by Age of Enlightenment ideas and the example of the French Revolution—led the movement. The Congress declared Venezuela's independence on 5 July 1811, establishing the Republic of Venezuela.

Even before the Congress began its sessions in November 1810, a civil war started between those who supported the juntas, and eventually independence, and royalists who wanted to maintain the union with Spain. Two provinces, Maracaibo Province and Guayana Province, and one district, Coro, never recognized the Caracas Junta and remained loyal to the governments in Spain. Military expeditions to bring Coro and Guayana under the control of the Republic failed. In 1811 an uprising in Valencia against the Republic was successfully suppressed. By 1812 the situation increasingly became aggravated for the young Republic. It was short of funds, Spanish Regency set up a blockade (although it was easily bypassed by British and American merchant ships), and, shortly after, on 26 March 1812, a devastating earthquake affected republican areas. In these desperate moments, Miranda was given dictatorial powers, nevertheless, he was unable to stem the royalist advance headed by Captain Domingo de Monteverde. By midyear, after the Battle of La Victoria, the Republic collapsed. Miranda capitulated to Monteverde and signed an armistice on 25 July 1812.

== Second Republic (1813–1815) ==
Bolívar and other republicans continued the resistance from other parts of the Spanish South America and the Caribbean, or organized guerrilla movements in the interior of the country. In 1813 Bolívar joined the army of the United Provinces of New Granada. After winning a series of battles, Bolívar received the approval of the New Granadan Congress to lead a liberating force into Venezuela in what became known as the Admirable Campaign. At the same time, Santiago Mariño invaded from the northeast in an independently organized campaign. Both forces quickly defeated the royalist troops in various battles, such as Alto de los Godos. Bolívar entered Caracas on 6 August 1813, proclaiming the restoration of the Venezuelan Republic and his supreme leadership of it, something which was not fully recognized by Mariño based in Cumaná, although the two leaders did cooperate militarily.

In the viceroyalties of La Plata and New Granada the Creoles displaced the Spanish authorities with relative ease, as Caracas had done at first. The autonomous movement swept through New Granada, but the country remained politically disunited. Bogotá inherited the role of capital from Spain, but the royalists were entrenched in southern Colombia (Popayán and Pasto). Cali was a bastion of the independence movement just north of royalist territory. Cartagena declared independence not only from Spain but also from Bogotá. Bolívar arrived in Cartagena and was well received, as he was later in Bogotá, where he joined the army of the United Provinces of New Granada. He recruited a force and invaded Venezuela from the southwest, by crossing the Andes (1813). His chief lieutenant was the headstrong José Félix Ribas. In Trujillo, an Andean province, Bolívar emitted his infamous Decree of War to the Death with which he hoped to get the pardos and any mantuano who was having second thoughts on his side. At the time that Bolívar was victorious in the west, Santiago Mariño and Manuel Piar, a pardo from the Dutch island of Curaçao, were successfully fighting royalists in eastern Venezuela. Quickly losing ground (much as Miranda had a year earlier) Monteverde took refuge in Puerto Cabello, and Bolívar occupied Caracas, re-establishing the Republic, with two "states", one in the west headed by Bolívar and one in the east headed by Mariño.

But neither the successful invasions nor Bolívar's decree were provoking a massive enrollment of pardos in the cause of Independence. Rather it was the other way around. In the Llanos a populist Spanish immigrant caudillo, José Tomás Boves, initiated a widespread pardo movement against the restored Republic. Bolívar and Ribas held and defended the mantuano-controlled center of Venezuela. In the east, the royalists started recovering territory. After suffering a setback, Mariño and Bolívar joined their forces, but they were defeated by Boves in 1814. Republicans were forced to evacuate Caracas and flee to the east, where, in the port of Carúpano, Piar was still holding out. Piar, however, did not accept Bolívar's supreme command, and once again Bolívar left Venezuela and went to New Granada (1815). (See Bolívar in New Granada).

The traditional image of the Venezuelan llanos swarming with caudillos like Boves exaggerates the situation. Boves was the only significant pro-Spain caudillo and he was acting in concert with Francisco Tomás Morales, who was a regular officer of Spain. In the Battle of Urica, Boves was killed and Morales took command and carried out mopping up operations against the remaining patriot resistance, which included the capture and execution of Ribas. As was still common in the early 19th century, Morales had his head boiled in oil (to preserve it) and sent to Caracas. (See the Execution of Miguel Hidalgo in Mexico.) Boves died shortly thereafter in battle, but the country had been returned to royalist control, ending the second republic. Morillo arrived in Venezuela and began operations with Morales.

== Spanish reconquest of New Granada (1815–1816) ==
In Spain, anti-French forces had liberated the country, and the restored Ferdinand VII sent a large expeditionary force to Venezuela and New Granada under Pablo Morillo, who had distinguished himself during Spain's War of Independence.

Royalist forces under Morillo and Morales captured Cartagena and Bogotá in 1816. Before leaving for New Granada Morillo had decommissioned most of the irregular forces that had fought under Boves, except those that he took to New Granada. With little prospects, some pardos and llaneros began to join the rebellions that were breaking out against Spanish rule in the broad plains of southern Venezuela. In the meantime, Bolívar chose to sail to Jamaica to enlist British aid, which was refused. From there, he went to Haiti, which had been the first Latin American republic to become independent. With the support of the Haitian president Alexandre Pétion and with the naval aid of Luis Brión, another émigré, who was a merchant from Curaçao, Bolívar returned to Margarita Island, a secure republican redoubt, but his command of the republican forces was still not firm. Mariño, who had come back with Bolívar from Haiti, headed his own expeditions and succeeded in temporarily capturing Cumaná in 1817. With Brión supplying a small fleet, Bolívar sailed west along the Venezuelan coast to Ocumare de la Costa (the Expedition of Los Cayos), where, in fulfillment of Pétion's request, he officially proclaimed the end of slavery (although this went unheeded). Morales, back in Venezuela after subduing New Granada, attacked the republican expeditionary force with an army that vastly outnumbered the republicans. Bolívar fled, sailing once again to Haiti with Brión. However, Piar and Gregor MacGregor, a Scottish soldier of fortune, who had previously been active in New Granada, managed to escape with their forces into the interior of the country, defeating Morales at El Juncal in September 1816 before moving south to Guayana.

Boves's locally raised Llanero army was replaced in 1815 by a formal expedition sent from Spain under the leadership of Pablo Morillo. It was the largest expedition the Spanish had ever sent to the Americas. Venezuela's proximity to Cuba, Puerto Rico and Spain made it the first target of the royalist counterattack. The Llaneros were either demobilized or incorporated into the expeditionary units. The republican patriots found themselves once more dispersed, and again the war took a local character. Different patriot guerrilla bands formed, but could not agree on a united leadership, much less a united strategy. One group of patriots launched an expedition to eastern Venezuela that ended in failure. Bolívar thereafter sought to join forces with Manuel Piar, another patriot leader but differences between them prevented a united republican front. Bolívar then went to the Llanos where he joined forces with José Antonio Páez, but a failed attack on central Venezuela forced Bolivar to retreat back to Apure. Morillo counterattacked successfully but was defeated at the Battle of Las Queseras del Medio. A long-term stalemate ensued in which the royalists controlled the highly populated, urban north and the republicans the vast, under-populated plains of the south.

== Stalemate (1816–1819) ==
Bolívar and Brión returned and tried in 1817 to capture Barcelona, where the Spaniards repulsed them. In the meantime, Piar and Mariño had occupied defenceless Angostura (a city at the narrowest and deepest part of the Orinoco River, hence its name, subsequently changed to Ciudad Bolívar), to where Bolívar headed and was chosen as supreme leader of the independence movement. (It was at this time that Bolívar ordered the addition of a new star for Guayana to the seven stars on the Venezuelan flag, which represented the number of provinces that originally had favored independence. Since Bolívar played a central role in the symbolism of the Venezuelan government led by Hugo Chávez, this long-forgotten change was revived in the 2006 revision to the flag.) Once in Guayana, Bolívar quickly cashiered Piar, who had been trying (or was accused of trying—historians still debate this) to form a pardo force of his own, by having him arrested and executed after a court martial in which Brión was one of the judges. British veterans of the Napoleonic wars began arriving in Venezuela, where they formed the nucleus of what later became known as the British Legion. Morillo returned to Caracas and Morales was given troops to dominate eastern Venezuela, which he did successfully. Francisco de Paula Santander, a New Granadan who had retreated to the llanos after Morillo's invasion, met with Bolívar and agreed to join forces. Morillo's other lieutenant, the second in command of the expeditionary force, Miguel de la Torre, was ordered to put down a significant rebellion in the llanos of Apure led by José Antonio Páez. At the time in the Southern Cone of South America, José de San Martín had concluded the liberation of Chile with the essential support of the Chilean Bernardo O'Higgins.

The year 1818 saw a stalemate between the patriots based in Angostura (and free-wheeling in part of the llanos) and Morillo (entrenched in Caracas, triumphant in eastern Venezuela, and operating in the llanos as far as Apure). This is the time during which (according to Marx), Bolívar dilly-dallied and lost one skirmish after another, also saying that European officers in Angostura were egging him on to attack the center of Venezuela. (Bolívar did attempt to do so, but suffered defeat at La Puerta.) At the time James Rooke did in fact command over 1,000 European soldiers within Bolívar's army in Venezuela. But Morillo had larger forces, and not just of Spanish line troops but also of pardos still loyal to the Spanish crown.

In 1819 Bolívar proclaimed the republic of Great Colombia, which included Venezuela and New Granada. New volunteers arrived in Venezuela, though most, like those that preceded them, were in essence mercenaries probably under the illusion that there were fortunes to be made in Venezuela, which was hardly the case. There is no evidence that the British government was backing them, but since Spain was no longer a British ally, it was not hindering them either. In Europe, generally, Bolívar's name was known as was the Spanish American movement for independence, which had the sympathy of every liberal-minded person, as did the independence of Greece, then also in the process of emancipation. Morillo had his hands full and pardos were starting to look towards patriot leaders. Campaigns in eastern Venezuela began turning the tide for independence and in the llanos Páez defeated Morillo and Morales in Apure. This cleared the way for Bolívar and Santander to invade New Granada, where, in Pantano de Vargas, the Spaniards were defeated in a battle in which the British Legion played a central role and its commander, Rooke, was killed in action. In the battle of Boyacá (1819), Spanish power was crushed in New Granada, except in the south. Páez occupied Barinas and, from New Granada, Bolívar invaded Venezuela.

== Consolidation of independence ==
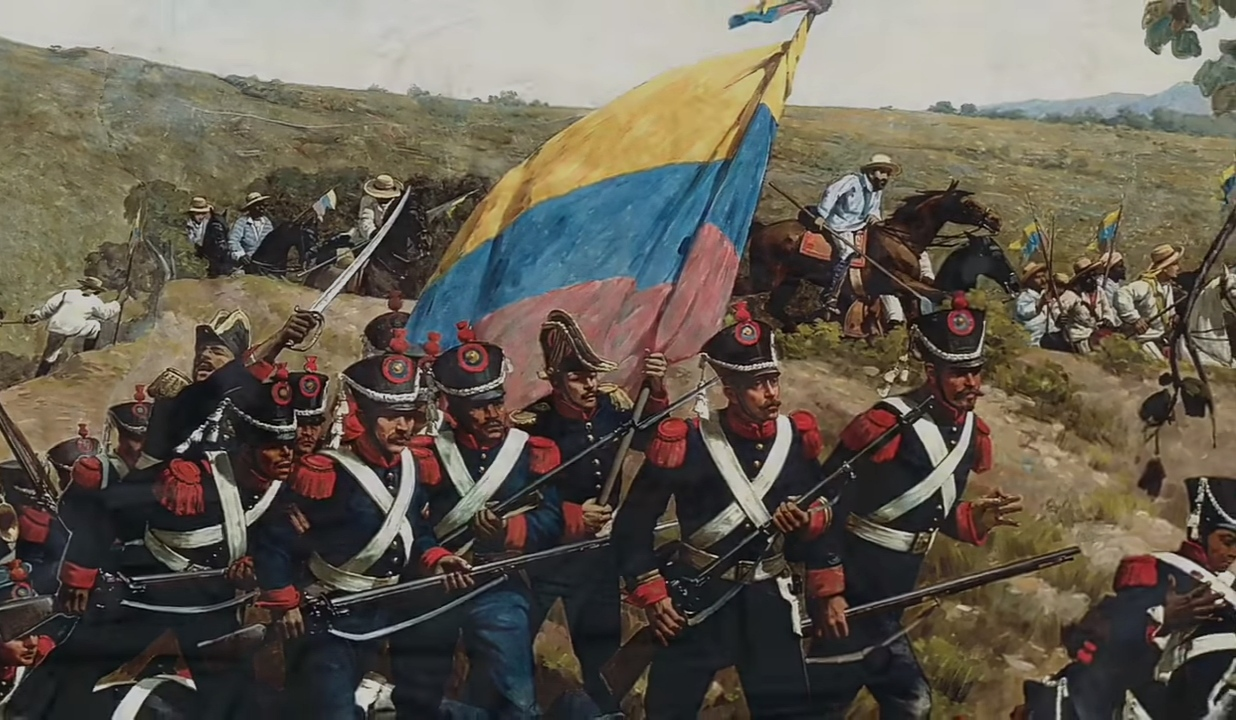
Detail of The Battle of Carabobo (1887) by Martín Tovar y Tovar. Federal Capitol of Venezuela.

In 1819, to break this impasse Bolívar invaded New Granada, which had been reconquered by Morillo's expeditionary force three years earlier. Bolívar decisively defeated the royalists at Boyacá. With the liberation of New Granada, the republicans had a significant base from which to attack Morillo's forces. A republican Congress at Angostura (today Ciudad Bolívar), which already had a small New Granada delegation, declared the union of New Granada and Venezuela in a Republic of Colombia (the Gran Colombia of contemporary accounts) to present a united front against the Spanish Monarchy.

In 1821, the Gran Colombian army won a decisive victory at the second Battle of Carabobo, after which the only cities in the hands of the royalist forces were Cumaná, which fell shortly thereafter, and Puerto Cabello, which managed to resist a siege before finally capitulating in October 1823.

== Aftermath ==
The Spanish sent a fleet in 1823 to reconquer the country but were defeated at the Battle of Lake Maracaibo. In the following years Venezuelan forces, as part of the army of Gran Colombia, continued campaigning under the leadership of Bolívar to liberate the southern parts of New Granada and Ecuador. Once this was accomplished, Gran Colombia continued its fight against the Spanish in Peru and Bolivia, completing the efforts of Chilean and Argentine patriots, such as José de San Martín, who liberated southern South America.

== Gual and España Conspiracy ==
San Blas Conspiracy

It consisted of a Liberal movement that involved the installation of democracy in Spain, inspired by the French Revolution and with the participation of important members of the society. Regardless this attempt at democracy failed, and some of their members were sent to prisons in Spanish Colonies, one of them, Juan Batista Picornell, was sent to the Port of La Guaira, where he secretly met with Manuel Gual and Jose Maria España. His revolutionary Ideas spread throughout the country, and sooner than later both Gual and España found themselves leading a conspiracy against the Spanish rule.

Manuel Gual and Jose Maria España

This conspiracy took place in the city of La Guaira, it was inspired by both the San Blas Conspiracy and the French revolution, and similar to the first one, it was led by very important members of the society, lawyers, engineers, and merchants, regardless of this, people from all races and status in society joined and conspired against the colonists. One of the main objectives this movement followed was the equality of man and equal rights for every one, either black or white, rich or poor. According to Tomas Fernandez and Elena Tamaro, this conspiracy had gained a lot of supporters both inside and outside the country, even the British and French navies supported their ambition of freedom against the Spanish rule.

In July of 1797 the conspiracy was supposed to materialize it's ambitions, but the Spanish Authorities including the Bishop of Caracas and the Governor of the Captaincy General of Venezuela, were quick enough to capture, interrogate and torture every individual suspected to be part of this conspiracy. Both Manuel Gual and Jose Maria España escaped to the Antilles, and even met again in Trinidad shortly after. España came back in 1799, he arrived to Barcelona and came back to la Guaira where he aspired to continue with his ambitions, regardless of the 5000 pesos reward on his head. He stayed in the port until he was captured, tortured and dismembered by the Spanish authorities. His parts where displayed all around the city of Caracas, which set an example of what happened to anybody that challenged their authority. According to the "Instituto Panamericano de Geografía e Historia" Gual never set foot again in Venezuela, and died while being persecuted by the Spanish.

Legacy

These events inspired liberals in the Americas to realize that this goal may be achieved. The Spanish authorities instead of achieving what they wanted with their treatment of revolutionaries, inspired even more hate and liberalism in the overall public. This conspiracy gave the Americas a message, that was transmitted through not only speech but by text and Ideas, Documents like "Derechos del Hombre y del Ciudadano" where widely spread throughout the country and helped achieve the ultimate goal of independence from the colonists.

== See also ==
- Military career of Simón Bolívar
- Simón Bolívar
- Eulalia Ramos
- Spanish American wars of independence
- Latin American wars of independence
- Venezuelan Independence
