= Supreme Junta =

Governing institution of Spanish Venezuela from 1810 to 1811

Supreme Conservative Junta of the Rights of Fernando VII
- La Suprema Junta Conservadora de los Derechos de Fernando VII (Spanish)
- Central government

Overview
- Established: 19 April 1810
- Dissolved: 2 March 1811
- Polity: Captaincy General of Venezuela

The Supreme Junta (Spanish: Junta Suprema de Caracas) was the institution that governed the Captaincy General of Venezuela following the forced resignation of the Captain General Vicente Emparán on April 19, 1810, marking the beginning of the Venezuelan War of Independence. It lasted until March 2, 1811, when the first constituent congress of the First Republic of Venezuela was established.

Before the First Republic of Venezuela was established, King Ferdinand VII of Spain accepted the abdication of his father and chose to renounce his name as King on May 10, 1808. This left Napoleon Bonaparte to place his brother, Joseph Bonaparte, in charge as King of Spain through a royal decree on June 6, 1808. Following the events of the Revolution of April 19, 1810, the commanding General and other colonial officials designated by Joseph Bonaparte to oversee the Captaincy General of Venezuela, were deposed by an expanded municipal government in Caracas that called itself: the Supreme Junta to Preserve the Rights of Ferdinand VII (La Suprema Junta Conservadora de los Derechos de Fernando VII).

One of the first measures taken by the revolutionaries, after securing the support of six provinces, was to send diplomatic missions abroad with the hope of gaining support and recognition for the revolution and that of the Supreme Junta of Caracas as the legitimate councilor of Venezuela in the absence of the King. Simón Bolívar along with Luis López Méndez and Andrés Bello as secretary, set sail for London from La Guaira in early June 1810. Juan Vicente Bolívar Palacios, brother of the Liberator, Jose Rafael Revenga and Telesforo Orea sailed for the United States, and had some success in gaining the interest of that country to support the Supreme Junta.
