= James Rooke (British Legion officer) =

British soldier who fought in the Napoleonic and Spanish American Wars of Independence

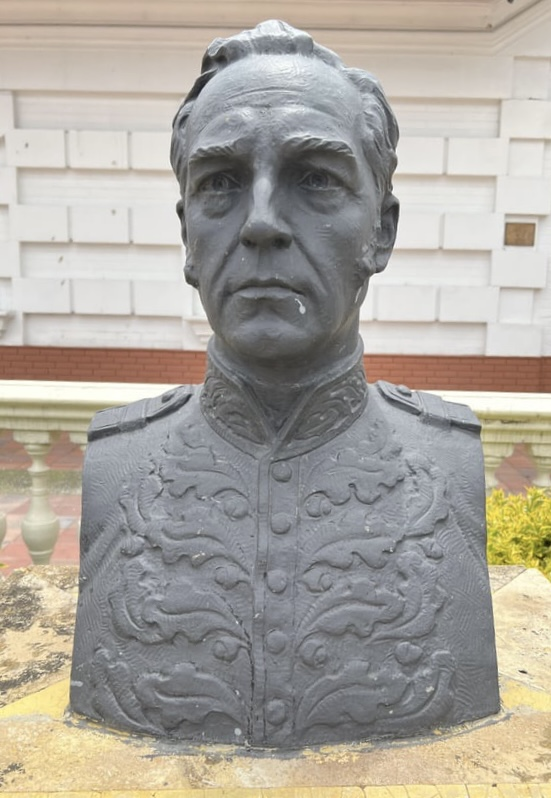
- A bust of Rooke located in the central plaza of Paipa.
- Born: 1770; Dublin, Ireland
- Died: July 28, 1819 (aged 48–49); Tunja Province, Viceroyalty of New Granada
- Military career
- Allegiance: Kingdom of Great Britain; United Kingdom; Venezuela
- Branch: British Army; Liberator Army of Venezuela of New Granada
- Service years: 1791–1802; 1813–1816; 1817–1819
- Rank: Colonel
- Unit: Cavalry Staff Corps
- Commands: 1st Regiment of Hussars of Venezuela; British Legion
- Conflicts: French Revolutionary Wars; Hundred Days; Battle of Waterloo; Venezuelan War of Independence; Battle of Calabozo; Battle of El Sombrero; Battle of El Semén; Battle of Ortiz; Battle of Rincón de los Toros; Colombian War of Independence; Bolívar's campaign to liberate New Granada; Battle of Vargas Swamp

James Rooke (1770–1819) also known as Jaime Rooke or Jaime Rook was a British career soldier who fought in the Napoleonic Wars and in the Venezuelan and Colombian wars of Independence.

Born in Dublin to a retired British army general, he joined the British army in 1791 fighting in the French Revolutionary Wars and later joined the Duke of Wellington's allied army in Spain in 1813. Rooke would also participated at the Battle of Waterloo.

After the end of the Napoleonic wars he traveled to South America and joined General Simon Bolivar's army in Venezuela where he became the commander of the British Legions during the South American wars of independence fighting in the inconclusive 1818 Center campaign. He took part in the New Granadan Campaign of 1819 when Bolivar invaded from Venezuela in an effort to liberate New Granada from Spanish control.

Rooke was mortally wounded at the Battle of Vargas Swamp on July 25, 1819, when he led his battalion in an uphill bayonet charge against Spanish forces on Picacho Hill. He initially survived his injuries and army doctors tried unsuccessfully to save him. He died of gangrene 3 days later.

He is remembered today in both Colombia and Venezuela as a hero of the Independence wars.

== Biography ==
James Rooke was born in Dublin around 1770, to an Irish mother and a British father. While there is few information regarding his mother, his father was General James Rooke of the British Army. At the age of 21, Rooke joined the British Army in 1791 as a Second Lieutenant and took part in the various campaigns of the French Revolutionary Wars, reaching the rank of major by 1802. Rooke was well-connected, and became a close friend of the Prince of Wales.

However, in 1801 he had to sell most of his property to pay his debts, and moved to France, which was then at peace with Britain, but when war broke out again, the French authorities interned him being held at Verdun. He remained in prison until his escape at the start of 1813, when he managed to reach the Duke of Wellington's headquarters in Cadiz, Spain. Rooke commissioned as Second Lieutenant on 15 April 1813 and promoted to Lieutenant in August but was discharged from the army when hostilities ended with the abdication of Napoleon in 1814.

When Napoleon returned in 1815 and began his Hundred Days campaign he traveled to Belgium to rejoin Wellington's army and fought at the Battle of Waterloo. At Waterloo he was made aide-de-camp to the Dutch Prince of Orange, and was wounded in the battle. For his services in the battle he was made a Lieutenant in the Staff Corps. of Cavalry on August 11, 1815.

== South America ==
Rooke left the British army in 1816 and made a trip to St. Kitts in the Caribbean to visit his sister Eleanor, who was wife of Thomas Probyn, the Governor of the colony.

=== Venezuela ===
In September 1817, Rooke sailed to Angostura (now Ciudad Bolívar) in Venezuela and enrolled in General Simón Bolivar's Liberator army, that was fighting for Venezuelan independence from Spain. Rooke was given the rank of lieutenant colonel, and organized and commanded an Anglo-Venezuelan unit, the 1st Regiment of Hussars of Venezuela.

With this unit, he fought in several battles during the inconclusive Venezuelan campaign of 1818 and was wounded twice. In March 1819, Bolívar consolidated most of his foreign volunteers into a brigade of 250 men, named the British Legion, and appointed Rooke as its commander. He was also promoted to the rank of Colonel.

=== New Granada Campaign of 1819 ===
In a bold attempt to break the stalemate with the Spanish forces, Bolivar decided to move west, ascend the Andes and seize the high ground to liberate New Granada. The march began in the height of the rainy season with Bolivar marching from the plains of Venezuela in early May 1819 later reaching Tame in the eastern plains of Casanare in New Granada to join with the other portion of the army that had been raised there by Brigadier General Francisco de Paula Santander. Bolivar's army arrived on June 15, 1819, he would spend the next few days organizing the army. At Tame, Rooke's British Legion was composed 200 men with Sergeant Major John Mackintosh as his second in command, the Legion was part of the 2nd Regiment of Brigadier General José Antonio Anzoátegui's rearguard division marching at the very back of the army.

The army soon left Tame for the Eastern Andes, since the early hours had a more tolerable climate troops were awaken around 4am and formed up by 4:30am and marching by 5am. During the crossing the Andes through the Paramo Pisba, the rest of the army would cross between the days of July 1 to the 6 taking many losses, the British Legion would not cross until July 13 to 14, the crossing was gruelling and the entire army had lost around 300 men en route, of whom 60 were from the British Legion. After their difficult crossing, the Legion rested at the town of Socha and would rejoin the army by July 22 at Bonza where their presence was greatly needed.

At his camp in Bonza, Bolivar planned to cross the Chicamocha River in order to reach the provincial capital of Tunja which would allow his army to cut off the Royalist Army's and Supply and communication lines to the viceregal capital of Santa Fe. On July 25, 1819, he crossed the river, and was blocked by Royalists while on the Tibasosa to Paipa road which resulted in the Battle of Vargas Swamp, near the town of Paipa. In the initial stages of the battle, the British Legion was kept in the reserve, however as the Cazadores battalion of the Vanguard division under the command of General Francisco de Paula Santander were pushed back by the Spanish 1st Rey Battalion who occupied Picacho Hill, Bolívar ordered the British Legion into the battle to support them. It would be here where Rooke fought with distinction, as he led his legion in a bayonet charge storming uphill against the Spanish defences. During this action both Rooke and Daniel Florence O'Leary were wounded, with Rooke's being of grave concern which led to the amputation of his left arm. However his efforts were vital in contributing to the Patriot victory which was finally achieved after 5 hours of gruelling combat which saw both sides taking heavy losses.

== Death and legacy ==
During the battle Rooke was shot in his left elbow causing a rupture of its joint, due to the battle the army surgeon was unable to amputate his arm until the next day. Once Rooke had his left arm amputated, he raised it with his right arm and shouted in poorly accented Spanish: "Viva la Patria!" (Long live the homeland.) The surgeon asked him in English: "Which Country? Ireland or England?" Rooke shook his head and replied: "The country which will bury me..."

Shortly after, Rooke died on 28 July 1819 at a monastery in Belén de Chámeza, near Tunja. Bolivar who had always respected and admired him for his professionalism, remarked:

"Colonel Rooke, leaving the cradle of glory, came to find his grave fighting for the freedom of America"

Rooke is remembered in Colombia, which honors him for being one of the architects of South American independence. His widow, Mrs. Anna Rooke, drew a pension for life and was given honors of a Military Widow.

There is a bronze statue of Colonel Rooke in the nearby town of Paipa where the main square is named after him. There is also a unit of the Colombian army, the 18th Infantry Battalion, named after him.
