= British Legions =

Foreign volunteer units in the Spanish American wars of independence

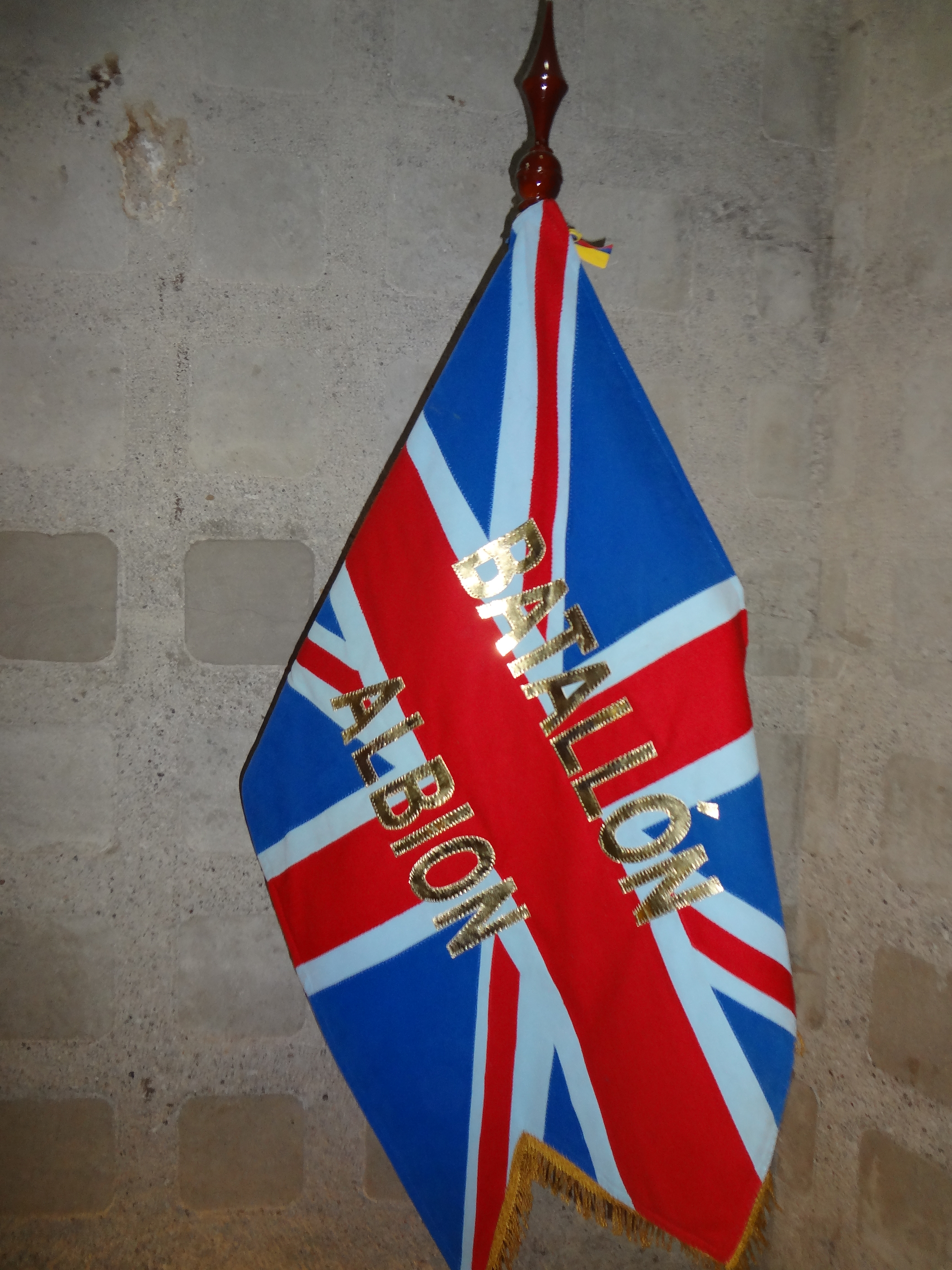
- Active: 1817–1824
- Country: Venezuela (1817–1819); Gran Colombia (1819–1824)
- Type: Infantry; Cavalry; Artillery
- Size: ~6,500
- Motto: "Morir o vencer" (Die or Conquer)
- March: "Ye Gentlemen of England"
- Engagements: Spanish American wars of independence

Commanders
- Supreme commander: Simón Bolívar
- Notable commanders: James Rooke; Arthur Sandes

Insignia
- The Union Flag carried throughout the campaigns.

- Flag of the Irish Legion carried by General Devereux

The British Legion (Spanish: Legión británica) or British Legions (Legiones británicas) were foreign volunteer units which fought under Simón Bolívar against Spain for the independence of Colombia, Venezuela, and Ecuador, and under José de San Martín for the independence of Peru, in the Spanish American wars of independence. Venezuelans generally called them the Albion Legion. They were composed of over seven thousand volunteers, mainly Napoleonic War veterans from Great Britain and Ireland, as well as some German veterans and some locals recruited after arriving in South America. Volunteers in the British Legion were motivated by a combination of both genuine political conviction and mercenary motives.

Their greatest achievements were at the Boyacá (1819), Carabobo (1821), Pichincha (1822) and Battle of Ayacucho (1824) which secured independence for Colombia, Venezuela, Ecuador and Peru from Spanish rule respectively.

== Background ==
At the end of the Napoleonic Wars the British Empire no longer required a large standing army. In April 1817, The Times calculated that there were 500,000 ex-soldiers in a British population of 25 million. After a quarter-century of Continental wars—both the wars against Revolutionary France and the Napoleonic Wars—these men had no other employment history or trade and, therefore, often found themselves in poverty.

South America's wars of independence from Spain provided many of them with an opportunity to continue their military careers and escape from the prospect of inactivity and poverty at home. Many Britons were still concerned by the threat that Spain, as a restored world power, potentially posed to Britain. Despite Spain and Britain having been allies in the Peninsular War just a few years before, many Britons' image of the Spanish in the Americas was influenced by the now-disputed Black Legend.

The motivations of volunteers for the British Legions varied. Volunteers were also motivated by the liberal propaganda of Simón Bolívar's supporters that portrayed the war as bringing freedom and rights to people under Spanish tyranny. For these reasons, particularly the former, the recruiting of British volunteers received tacit government support, even if in principle the British Crown discontinued its support to the insurgents after the Congress of Vienna in 1814. Mercenary interests also played a large part in motivating potential recruits, who were often unemployed, and perceived South America as a place where they would be able to continue to earn a living. About 7,000 British men had volunteered and only about one third of these men had previous military experience. The others were restless, idealistic young men who were too young to participate in the Napoleonic wars and saw joining as a "culture of adventure."

=== Formation ===
From May 1817, the British volunteers were mainly recruited in London by Bolivar's agent, Luis López Méndez with the probable approval of the Duke of Wellington. The recruits were encouraged by promises of pay equivalent to the British army and by promotion to one rank above that which they had held in the army. Pay was to commence upon arrival in Venezuela and when the call was heard on the streets of London thousands began to volunteer for the expedition and soon the first five detachments were formed as follows:

Early Formation	Number
1st Venezuelan Hussars: Colonel Gustavus Hippisley	30 officers and 160 NCOs
2nd Venezuelan Hussars (Red Hussars): Colonel Henry Wilson	20 officers and 100 NCOs
1st Venezuelan Lancers: Colonel Robert Skeene	20 officers and 200 NCOs
1st Venezuelan Rifles: Colonel Donald Campbell	37 officers and 200 NCOs
Brigade of Artillery: Colonel Joseph Gilmour	10 officers and 80 NCOs; 5 6-pounders, 1 5½ howitzer

== Campaigns ==
The soldiers used Margarita Island as their base. Conditions there were poor and some died of disease. To replace losses they recruited 100 locals into their ranks.

Expedition embarked Under command:	Number of Soldiers
Colonel Hippisley	720
Colonel James Towers English	1,200
Colonel Elson	572
General John D'Evereux	1,729
General Gregor MacGregor	600
Colonel Meceroni	300
Colonel James Rooke	200
Others	387
Total	5,508

=== Venezuela and New Granada ===
They took part in the campaign of the Venezuelan Llanos in 1818 and fought at the battles of El Sombrero, La Puerta, Ortiz, Rincón de los Toros and Calabozo. These first recruits from Britain made a good impression on Bolivar who was anxious to secure the services of more British volunteers. In March 1819, Bolivar combined most of his foreign volunteers into a brigade of 250 men named the British Legions, with James Rooke as commander. George Elsom, who had formerly been an ensign with a militia regiment near London and who had sailed with Hippisley's expedition, returned to London to recruit. Amongst his recruits were some 110 Hanoverians, who were commanded by John Uslar who saw action at Waterloo with the King's German Legion.

In June 1819 Elsom arrived at the mouth of the Orinoco with the first wave of British troops. They numbered some 2,200 men equipped and uniformed, under the command of Captain George Gibson and twenty officers. This Second British Legion' as it became known consisted of the 1st British Legion led by Colonel James Towers English, the 2nd British Legion led by Colonel John Blossett, and the Irish Legion, led by Colonel William Aylmer (1772–1820).

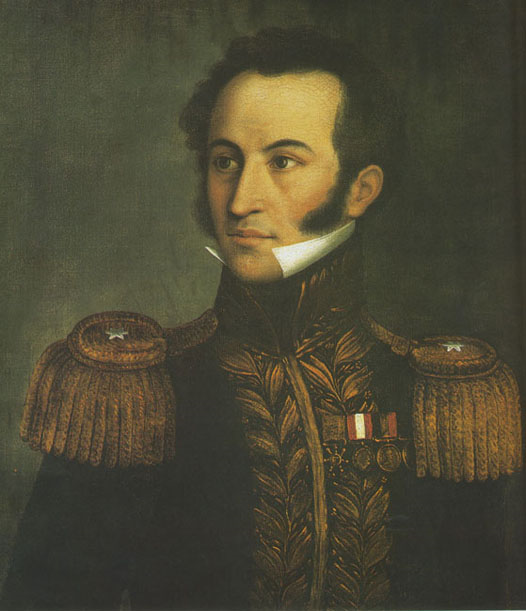
Colonel Arthur Sandes who commanded the Rifles

The Legion adopted the motto Morir o vencer (Die or Conquer), as well as an anthem, composed to the tune of Ye Gentlemen of England which was continually played by the Legion's band. The uniforms were similar to those worn by the British army which had been supplied by the firm of Herring and Richardson who had also fitted out the ships. In Ireland a similar recruiting process took place. Led by John D'Evereux who enlisted 1700 men which became known as the Irish Legion.

The Rifle Battalion joined the same month which saw Bolivar reorganise his forces. The Rifles, reinforced by another 350 British troops who had recently arrived in South America, were then formed into two battalions. The first was to be commanded by Colonel Arthur Sandes and the second by Major John Mackintosh who would later become a military aide-de-camp to Simón Bolívar and Antonio José de Sucre.

The British Legions after months of inactivity joined Bolivar's army on the Plains of Apure towards the end of 1818 but saw no serious action until March 19, 1819, in a skirmish in the woods of Gamarra. They would soon become an important part of Bolívar's army to liberate the Viceroyalty of New Granada. They had to endure the secretive and brutal crossing of the Andes from May to June during which the Patriot army suffered greatly including the British.

They played a pivotal role however in the Battle of Vargas Swamp on July 25. During this action Bolivar found himself in a difficult position; the left flank of the Patriot army was outflanked and withdrew in disorder. Rooke then led the 2nd Rifles against the Spanish positions on the hills. A ferocious bayonet charge regained the positions for the Patriots. Rooke fell mortally wounded while Sandes was also wounded twice. Despite heavy casualties the British troops distinguished themselves.

At the Battle of Boyacá on August 7, 1819, Sandes' Rifles Battalion led a bayonet charge on the royalist artillery which turned the tide of the battle. After the triumphal entry into Santa Fe de Bogotá Bolivar credited them with the victory saying "those soldier-liberators are the men who deserve these laurels" They were awarded with the 'Order of the Liberator' one of the rare occasions during the war when this decoration was bestowed onto an entire unit.

At the victory of Carabobo the legion troops were led by Colonel Thomas Ilderton Ferrier. They fought in the battle as part of the 1st Division, led by General José Antonio Páez. They defended strategically important hills while being greatly outnumbered and low on supplies; their heroic stand was the decisive moment of the day. They suffered 119 casualties, of those were two officers with Ferrier among the dead. Bolívar described the Legions and all who served in them as "the saviours of my country". As a reward for their service, they were given the Carabobo battle honour by the general staff of the Patriot forces, and all its personnel rewarded with the Liberators' Star by Bolívar himself, 20 days after the battle.

The Foreign Enlistment Act 1819 was passed to uphold British neutrality in the Spanish American wars of independence and made it a crime punishable by fines and imprisonment for British subjects to serve in foreign militaries. The 1819 act was almost never enforced.

=== Ecuador and Peru ===
With the independence of Colombia and Venezuela secured, Bolivar and his patriot army along with the British Legions moved South to drive the Spanish out of Peru and Ecuador. They marched over the mountains again this time to a land of high volcanoes where they managed to force the Spanish to withdraw at the Battle of Bomboná on April 7, 1822. The following month the Legions assisted Sucre's army and marched higher still to Quito standing at 9,300 feet in the mountains. There on 24 May 1822, they fought on the flanks of a volcano at the Battle of Pichincha. The battle could have turned into a rout if the British and Irish troops had not thwarted a dangerous flank attack by the veteran Spanish Aragón battalion. The victory at Pichincha for the Patriot army secured independence for Ecuador.

They took part in the last major campaign of the Independence wars in Peru during 1824; British volunteers, including the 1st Rifles under Sandes, were present at the Battle of Junin in August and the Battle of Ayacucho in December which marked the end of Spanish rule in South America.

== Aftermath ==
The British Legions fought until the end of the wars, their number much depleted. Many of the survivors settled in the new states that they helped to create. For a long time they were largely forgotten to history.

In the overall strategy British pressure by use of their navy and diplomacy was sufficient to prevent Spain from attempting any serious reassertion of its control over its lost colonies. At the same time British intervention between 1815 and 1819, was one of the key factors for the independence of South American states, in particular the role of the British Legions in Bolivar's campaigns.

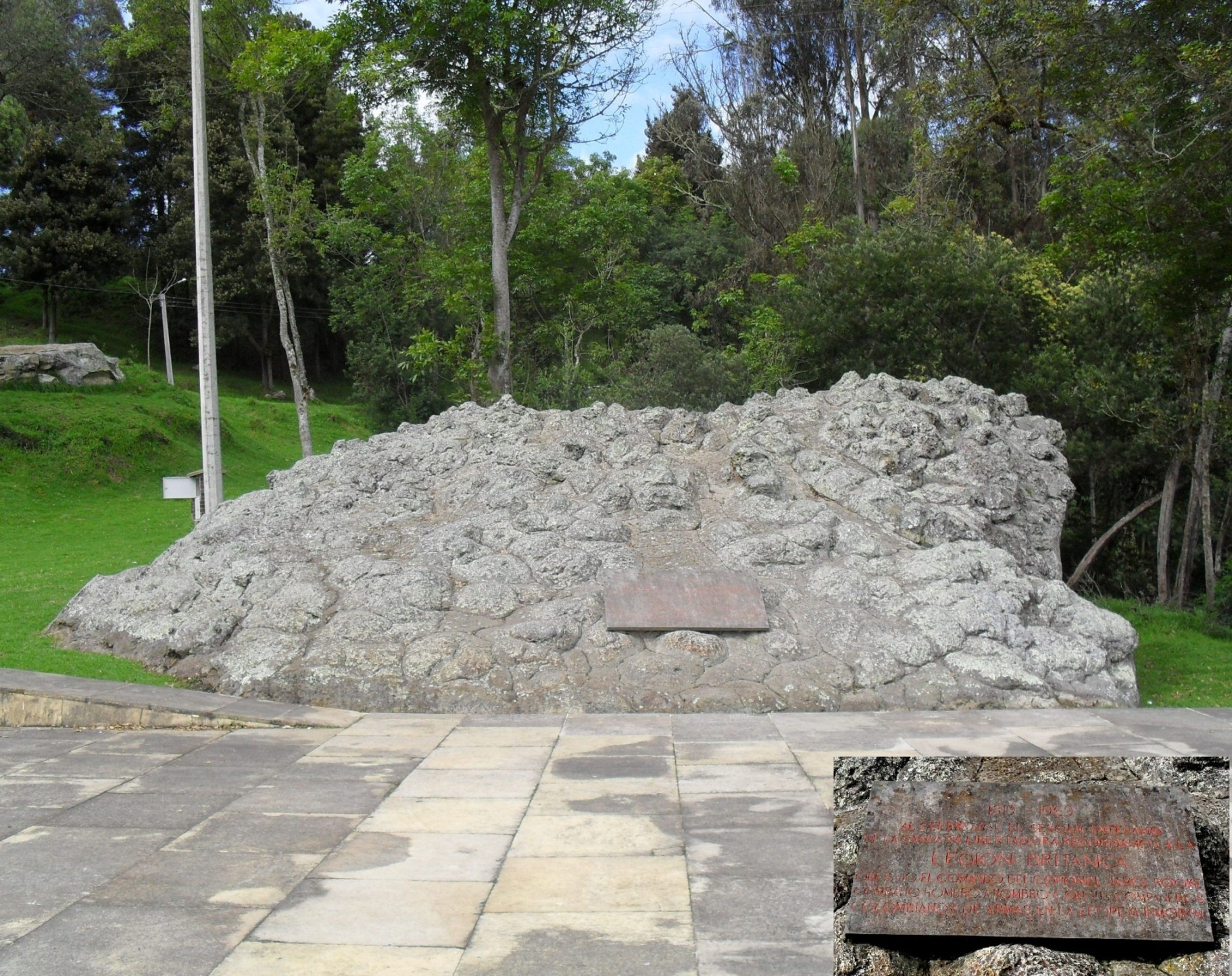
A monument honouring the British Legions at the Bridge of Boyacá

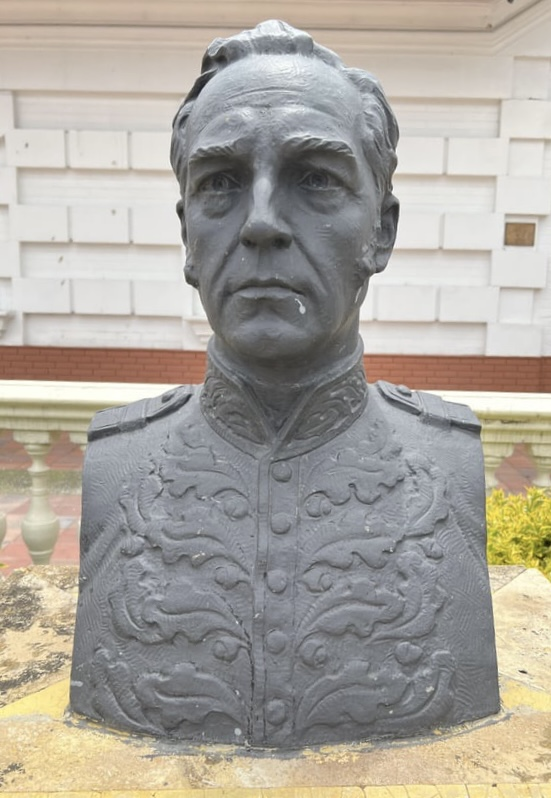
Bust of Colonel James Rooke located in the central plaza of the town of Paipa in the Boyacá Department in Colombia.

== See also ==
- Spanish American wars of independence
- Latin American wars of independence
- William Miller
- Thomas Cochrane

== Bibliography ==
- Boyd, Bill; Boyd, William Young (1998). Bolivar: Liberator of a Continent : a Dramatized Biography. SP Books. ISBN 9781561719945.
- Brown, Matthew. Adventuring through Spanish Colonies: Simón Bolívar, Foreign Mercenaries and the Birth of New Nations (Liverpool University Press, 2006). ISBN 1-84631-044-X
- Fanning, Tim (2018). Paisanos: The Irish and the Liberation of Latin America. University of Notre Dame Press. ISBN 9780268104924.
- Grant, R. G (2017). 1001 Battles That Changed the Course of History. Book Sales. ISBN 9780785835530.
- Dean, Malcolm; MacFarlane, Anthony; Brown, Matthew (2010) The Role of Great Britain on the Independence of Colombia.Republic of Colombia Ministry of Foreign Affairs.
- Hasbrouck, Alfred. Foreign Legionnaires in the Liberation of Spanish South America (Columbia University Press: New York, 1928; and New York: Octagon Books, 1969).
- Hughes, Ben, Conquer or Die!: British Volunteers in Bolivar's War of Extermination 1817-21 Osprey (2010) ISBN 1849081832
- Lambert, Eric. Voluntarios británicos e irlandeses en la gesta bolivariana, 3 vols. (Caracas: Ministerio de Defensa, 1980 and 1993)
- Mackenzie, S.P (2013). Revolutionary Armies in the Modern Era: A Revisionist Approach The New International History. Routledge. ISBN 9781135091194.
- Rodríguez, Moises Enrique. Freedom's Mercenaries: British Volunteers in the Wars of Independence of Latin America, 2 vols. (Lanham MD: Hamilton Books, University Press of America, 2006). ISBN 978-0-7618-3438-0
- Slatta, Richard W; De Grummond, Jane Lucas (2003). Simón Bolívar's Quest for Glory Volume 86 of Texas A & M University military history series. Texas A&M University Press. ISBN 9781585442393.
