= Trinidad Province =

Province of the Spanish Empire

Coordinates: 10°39′N 67°25′W

The Province of Trinidad (1525–1802) was a province of the Spanish Empire which was created in 1525. From 1591 to 1731 it was merged with Guayana Province, as Trinidad-Guayana Province. It was lost to the British in 1797, a loss recognised by the Treaty of Amiens in 1802.

== History ==
In 1520 the governorship of Trinidad was granted to Rodrigo de Bastidas, but this was opposed by Diego Columbus, and Bastidas waived the grant. In 1530 the king of Spain handed it over to Antonio Sedeño who was its first governor until 1535 when he abandoned it due to ongoing litigation over jurisdiction with the Province of Cumaná. Its first capital was San José de Oruña, founded in 1592 and destroyed by the English pirate Walter Raleigh.

In 1596, Trinidad was annexed to the Guayana Province under the government of Antonio de Berrío, who had governed the island since 1591. The province was overseen by the president of the Real Audiencia of Santo Domingo, which served as its court of appeal, until 1739 when it was transferred over to the Viceroyalty of New Granada and the Audiencia of Bogotá.

By 1757, the old capital, San José de Oruña, about 11 kilometres (7 mi) inland, had fallen into disrepair, and Governor Don Pedro de la Moneda transferred his seat to Port of Spain, which thus became Trinidad's de facto capital.

The province was returned to the jurisdiction of the Santo Domingo Royal Audience and placed in the Captaincy General of Venezuela in 1777. The 1783 Cedula of Population, which encouraged the settlement of French Catholics in the island, led to a rapid increase in the population. The last Spanish Governor of Trinidad, Don José Maria Chacón founded San Fernando in 1784 and devoted much of his time to developing the island. He compelled the province's Cabildo (governing council) to move to Port of Spain, and he limited its powers to the municipality.

With the establishment of the Royal Audience of Caracas in 1786, all administrative and judicial functions were centered on Caracas.

Finally in 1797, a British fleet commanded by Henry Harvey seized the island turning it into a British colony. Its loss was recognised at the Treaty of Amiens in 1802.

== See also ==
- History of Trinidad and Tobago
- Colonial Venezuela
  - Governorate of New Andalusia (1501–13)
  - New Andalusia Province (1537–1864)
  - Captaincy General of Venezuela (1777–1823)

== Sources ==
- Fundación Polar (1997). "Trinidad, gobernacion de" in Diccionario de Historia de Venezuela. Caracas: Fundación Polar. ISBN 980-6397-37-1
