= New Andalusia =

New Andalusia (Spanish: Nueva Andalucía) may refer to:

- Governorate of New Andalusia (1501–1513)
- Governorate of New Andalusia, in South America, created as one of the 1534 grants of Charles I of Spain
- New Andalusia Province, in South America, first colonized by Spaniards in 1569, led by explorer Diego Hernández de Serpa
- New Navarre, or New Andalucia Province (New Spain), created in 1565
- Nueva Andalucía (Marbella), a residential area west of Marbella, Spain
