= Governorates of the Spanish Empire =

After the 1494 territorial division of South America between Spain and Portugal in the Treaty of Tordesillas, the colonial administration of the continent was divided into Governorates.

== Caribbean and Tierra Firme ==
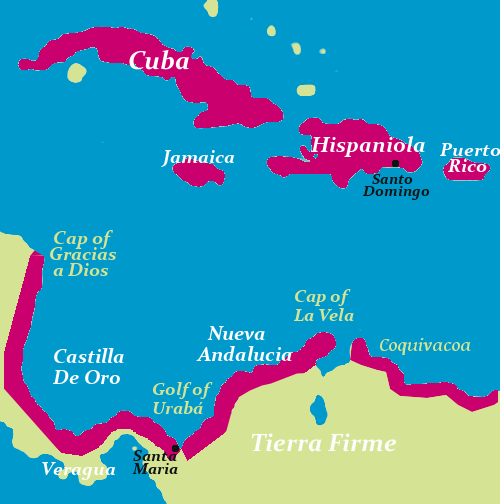
Tierra Firme, Governorate of Castilla de Oro and New Andalucia (Mainland of Colombia)

- Governorate of Santo Domingo 1493 to Christopher Columbus
- Governorate of Puerto Rico 1508 to Juan Ponce de León
- Governorate of Cuba 1511 to Diego Velázquez de Cuéllar
- Governorate of New Andalucia-Coquibacoa (Venezuela) 1501 to Alonso de Ojeda
- Governorate of New Andalucia (Colombia) 1510 to Alonso de Ojeda
- Governorate of Castilla de Oro 1513 to Pedro Arias Dávila
- Governorate of Pánuco. Its ill-defined territory may have corresponded to the Huasteca, as far north as the Pánuco River. This gobierno was absorbed by New Spain in 1534 when Nuño de Guzmán moved to Nueva Galicia.
- Governorate of New Spain 1521 to Hernán Cortés, elevated into a viceroyalty in 1535.
- Governorate of La Florida 1565 to Pedro Menéndez de Avilés
- Governorate of Louisiana 1762 to Bernardo de Gálvez

== South America ==
Four enclaves after Spanish conquest of the Inca Empire:

The adelantado grants of Charles V prior to the establishment of the Viceroyalty of Peru.

- Governorate of New Castile, granted in 1529 to Francisco Pizarro and redefined in 1534, it consisted of the territories approximately from the present Ecuador–Colombia border in the north to Cusco in the south
- Governorate of New Toledo, granted in 1534 to Diego de Almagro and consisting of the southern half of the former Inca Empire, Bolivia, parts of Southern Brazil, and stretching towards current parts of northern Chile.
- Governorate of New Andalusia, granted in 1534 to Pedro de Mendoza, was defined as stretching 200 leagues along the Pacific coast south of the New Toledo grant and reaching east to the Atlantic, covering the vast territory of current days North and Central Argentina, the totality of Uruguay and Paraguay, and parts of Central Chile. Only small areas of it were colonized, mainly along the Paraná River; this region did not fully develop colonially until decades later.
- Governorate of New Léon, granted in 1529 to Simón de Alcazaba y Sotomayor and redefined in 1534, it consisted of the southernmost part of the continent covering the Southern tip of the continent what is today current Patagonia Argentina and Chile, and Southern islands towards Antarctica; this was the last part of the colony to develop; and eventually attacked by the British pirates coming from Europe crossing the waters towards the Pacific Ocean en route to Tasmania current days Australia.
- Governorate of Terra Australis, granted to Pedro Sánchez de la Hoz in 1539 originally, included the territories from the south of the Strait of Magellan to the South Pole.
- Governorate of the Río de la Plata, established in 1549, it was originally simply a renamed New Andalusia until it was reorganized in the 17th century after successful settlement, this territory was granted to Governor Domingo Martínez de Irala and developed around the Silver River (Spanish: Río de la Plata) this governorate gave origin to the creation of Argentina and Uruguay.
