= Real Audiencia of Caracas =

The Real Audiencia of Caracas was the highest court of the Spanish Crown in the territory of the Captaincy General of Venezuela. It was created on 6 July 1786, in the city of Santiago de León de Caracas, and was one of the two the last Real Audiencias to be organized in continental America before the Spanish American wars of independence. It was officially installed on 19 July 1787.

== Creation ==
From 1550 to 1786, the territory of Venezuela was under the jurisdiction and administration of the Real Audiencia of Santa Fe de Bogotá. Over time, the Spanish moved away from their rigid centralized administrative system and divided their colonial empire into smaller, more manageable units. As a consequence, the Viceroyalty of New Granada (from 1717) and, within it, the Captaincy General of Venezuela were established. By royal decree of 6 July 1786, King Charles III ordered the establishment of a separate Royal Audiencia in Caracas.

== Jurisdiction ==
The reason for its establishment was a territorial reorganization of the colony. The regions of Cumaná, Margarita and Trinidad were transferred from the jurisdiction of the Real Audiencia of Santo Domingo to Caracas, while the territories of Caracas, Maracaibo, and Guyana were removed from the jurisdiction of the Real Audiencia of Santa Fe de Bogotá.

The Real Audiencia had as chairman the Captain General, bus his chairmanship was purely formal, as he had neither the right to speak nor to vote. Besides a chairman, the Audiencia had three Oidores, a fiscal, and several subordinate employees.

The establishment of the Audiencia had far-reaching consequences for the administration of justice in the region. For example, a Lawyers' College (Colegio de Abogados de Caracas) was established in Caracas in 1788, followed in 1790 by the Academy of Spanish and Public Law (Academia de Derecho Español y Público).

The Audiencia existed until 1821, when the Venezuelan territory became independent as part of the Republic of Gran Colombia, and jurisdiction was no longer in Spanish hands.
