= Pánuco (province) =

Province of New Spain

The Province of Pánuco was a province of the Spanish viceroyalty of New Spain. It was probably discovered by Amerigo Vespucci in 1498, and later by Juan de Grijalva. It was located on the Mexican gulf coast centered on Santiestebán de Pánuco, from the river of Tuxpan and extending into the current state of Tamaulipas. Originally inhabited by Huastecs, it was claimed both by conquistador Hernán Cortés who sent Francisco de Montejo to claim the area and by Francisco de Garay, governor of Jamaica, who sent Alonso Alvarez de Pineda. The province was the object of a power struggle between supporters of Cortés and his opponents, first divided into encomiendas and allotted to Cortés supporters.

A gobierno (governorate) of San Esteban de Pánuco was created in 1523. Its territory may have corresponded to the Huasteca, as far north as the Pánuco River. This gobierno was absorbed by New Spain in 1534.

In 1525 Nuño de Guzmán of the Anti-Cortés faction was appointed governor of Pánuco and he stripped Cortés' supporters of their encomiendas and undertook a policy of violent slave raids against the local Indians.
