= Captaincy General of Venezuela =

Administrative district within the Spanish Empire (1777–1834)

Captaincy General of Venezuela, Kingdom of Venezuela Capitanía General de Venezuela (Spanish), Reino de Venezuela (Spanish)
- 1777–1823
- Coat of arms of Caracas
- Motto: Plus ultra "Further Beyond"
- Anthem: Marcha Real "Royal March"
- Flag of Spain: first national flag, naval flag since 1785 and fortress flag from 1793, and the last Spanish flag to fly in continental America, in San Felipe Castle

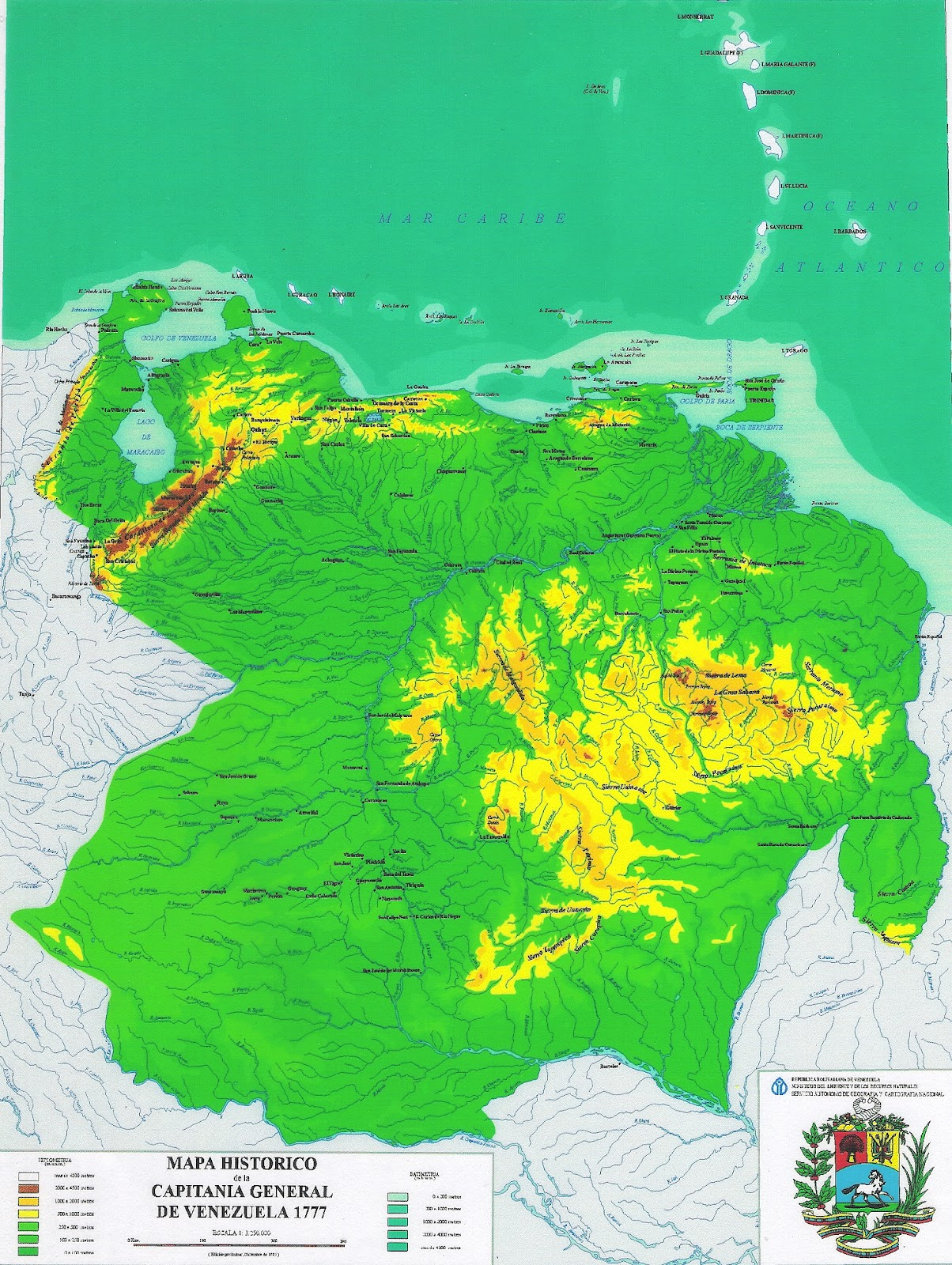
- Map type: Top: Captaincy General of Venezuela in 1777 (Projection).; Bottom: Map of the Captaincy General of Venezuela in 1777.
- Status: Captaincy De facto self-governing colony; contested by Spain (1810–1823)
- Capital: Santiago de León de Caracas
- Common languages: Spanish (official); Wayuu, Pemon, Warao, Yanomamö
- Demonyms: Spaniard, Venezuelan
- Government: General Captaincy
- Captain generals
  - 1777–1782: Luis de Unzaga
  - 1821–1823: Francisco Tomás Morales
- Legislature: Supreme Junta (1810–1811)
- History
  - Royal Decree: September 8, 1777
  - Revolution: April 19, 1810
  - Independence declaration ratified: 20 July 1811
  - Venezuelan War of Independence: 1810–1823
  - Capitulation: 24 July 1823

Population
  - 1810: 750,000
- Currency: Spanish colonial real
- ISO 3166 code: VE
Preceded by
Viceroyalty of New Granada
Venezuela Province
Succeeded by
Supreme Junta
First Republic of Venezuela
Second Republic of Venezuela
Third Republic of Venezuela
Gran Colombia

The Captaincy General of Venezuela (Spanish: Capitanía General de Venezuela), also known as the Kingdom of Venezuela (Spanish: Reino de Venezuela) was an administrative district of colonial Spain, created on September 8, 1777, through the Royal Decree of Graces of 1777, to provide more autonomy for the provinces of Venezuela, previously under the jurisdiction of the Audiencia of Santo Domingo (and thus the Viceroyalty of New Spain) and then the Viceroyalty of New Granada. It established a unified government in political (governorship), military (captaincy general), fiscal (intendancy), ecclesiastical (archdiocese) and judicial (audiencia) affairs. Its creation was part of the Bourbon Reforms and laid the groundwork for the future nation of Venezuela, in particular by orienting the province of Maracaibo towards the province of Caracas.

== History ==
=== Antecedents ===
In 1494, despite the presence of indigenous peoples in the Americas, Pope Alexander VI issued a papal decree with the Treaty of Tordesillas that unilaterally granted the Crown of Castile with full dominion over the majority of what is now regarded as South America. Following years of colonization by colonial Spain, the Bourbon dynasty took steps towards reorganizing their overseas possessions and Venezuela, in particular. When the New Granadan Viceroyalty was reestablished in 1739, the governor-captain general of Caracas was given military jurisdiction over the provinces of Maracaibo, Cumaná, Guayana, Trinidad and Margarita. The 18th century also marked a period of marked economic growth for Venezuela. Cocoa plantations were established along the littoral valleys, which resulted in large importations of slaves. The growth of the cocoa-exporting economy was created by the Real Compañía Guipuzcoana de Caracas, which was granted a full monopoly over exports and imports in 1728. The company's second largest export was tobacco. It also promoted the exploration and settlement of Venezuela's frontiers, most famously under the Expedition of the Limits, 1750–1761 headed by José de Iturriaga y Aguirre, which resulted in new settlements in Guayana Province. This growth was not experienced evenly, and the monopoly hurt small farmers, who continued to sell most of their product in the contraband trade. Resentment of the Company exploded in open revolt in 1749 headed by Canarian immigrant Juan Francisco de León.

=== Establishment ===
The Captaincy General, which was essentially a new viceroyalty in all but name, was actually created slowly over time by centralizing fiscal, administrative, military and ecclesiastical rule in Caracas. The first step was the creation of the Intendancy of Caracas, by Minister of the Indies, José de Gálvez in 1776. The new intendancy (superintendencia de ejército y real hacienda) covered the provinces of Venezuela (Caracas), Cumaná (sometimes New Andalusia), Guayana, Maracaibo, Trinidad and Margarita. Up to this point Maracaibo, Guayana and Trinidad's governance had been directly supervised by the Bogotá Audiencia; the other three provinces by the one in Santo Domingo. The following year a joint governorship-captaincy general with powers over military and administrative matters was established for the same provinces. Regional governors and military commanders were subordinated to the governor-captain general of Caracas. To maintain uniformity in judicial matters, in 1777 the provinces of Maracaibo, Margarita, Cumaná, Guayana and Trinidad were transferred to the Santo Domingo Audiencia, which had taken appeals from the province of Caracas since 1742. Judicial matters were finally centralized in 1786 with the creation of the Audiencia of Caracas, which had jurisdiction over these same provinces and the new Barinas Province, which had been established in the intervening years from the frontier regions of Maracaibo Province. The Audiencia was composed of a regent judge, three judges and a crown attorney. The governor-captain general served as its president. It was to carry out justice and to watch over the action of royal officials in the area of its jurisdiction. It only communicated directly with the Council of the Indies in Spain.

A consulado was established in 1793 to oversee the new captaincy general's trade. In religious matters all of the provinces were also placed under the direction of the new archdiocese of Caracas in 1803. Two new dioceses, Mérida and Guayana were created, as well. Previously areas of the new diocese of Mérida had been part of the archdiocese of Bogotá, and Guayana had been part of the diocese of Puerto Rico. Control of the Province of Trinidad was lost to the British in 1797.

=== Legislation establishing the Captaincy General ===
The Royal Decree establishing the Captaincy General:

The King.—Inasmuch and keeping in mind what has been reported to me by the current Viceroy, Governor and Captain General of the New Kingdom of Granada and the governors of the Provinces of Guayana and Maracaibo on the inconveniences that are created in the indicated provinces, as well as those of Cumaná and Islands of Margarita and Trinidad, by remaining united as they are to the Viceroyalty and Captaincy General of the indicated New Kingdom of Granada, because of the distance at which they find themselves from its capital Santa Fe, resulting as a consequence the delay in the decisions with the most grave harm to my Royal Service.

Therefore, to avoid these and greater harm, which would result in case of an invasion, I have best resolved the absolute separation of said Provinces of Cumaná, Guayana and Maracaibo, and islands of Trinidad and Margarita, from the Viceroyalty and Captaincy General of the New Kingdom of Granada, and add them in government and military matters to the Captaincy General of Venezuela, in the same manner that they are in regards to the administration of my Royal Treasury to the new Intendancy established in said Province and city of Caracas, its capital. In the same manner I have resolved to separate in judicial matters from the Audiencia of Santa Fe, and to add to the old one of Santo Domingo, the two mentioned Provinces of Maracaibo and Guayana, in the same manner that Cumaná and the islands of Margarita and Trinidad are, so that they find themselves under the same immediate Audiencia, Captain General and Intendant, be better ruled and governed with better utility to my Royal Service. Accordingly, I order the Viceroy and Audiencia of Santa Fe restrained from, and to abstain from, the knowledge of the respective matters which corresponded to them before the separation implied here; and order the governors of the Provinces of Cumaná, Guayana and Maracaibo, and Islands of Margarita and Trinidad, to obey as their Captain General, the one that today is, and in the future will be, of the Province of Venezuela, and carry out the orders that in my Royal Service he communicate to them in government and military matters; and that in the same way the governors of the Provinces of Maracaibo and Guayana observe the provisions that in the future my Royal Audiencia of Santo Domingo issues, accepting the appeals that are lodged before it according to and in the manner they have been, or should have been done, before the Audiencia of Santa Fe; such is my will. Given in San Ildefonso on the eighth of September of 1777.—I the King.

As representative of the King of Spain, José de Gálvez signed the Cedula de Poblacion of 1783 opening the island of Trinidad to immigration from, primarily, the French Caribbean islands. Negotiated by Phillipe Rose Roume de Saint-Laurant, the edict consists of 28 articles governing various forms of land grants to encourage population growth, the naturalization of inhabitants, taxation, the arming of slave owners, the duty and function of a militia to protect the island, and trade and mercantile issues.

The Royal Decree (Real Cédula) of June 13, 1786, was the first to establish the Real Audiencia, describe its functions and to define its limits (subsequent ones defined further faculties and appointed members):

His Majesty has resolved in view of everything, that the Province of Maracaibo continue united, as it is, to the Captaincy General and Intendancy of Caracas, keeping what is provided by the Royal Decree [Real Cédula] of February 15 of this year on the addition of the City of Trujillo and its jurisdiction to the Government of Maracaibo; and the creation for the present of a separate Command in the Province of Barinas. And to avoid the harm that would arise for the inhabitants of said Provinces of Maracaibo, Cumamá, Guayana, Margarita and Island of Trinidad, comprising the same Captaincy General, of having to recur for appeals in their affairs to the Audiencia Pretorial of Santo Domingo, the King has resolved to create another in Caracas, comprised for now of a Regent Dean, three judges [oidores] and a crown attorney [fiscal]; leaving the same number of ministers in the one in Santo Domingo and limiting its district to the Spanish part of that island, the islands of Cuba and Puerto Rico; to which end His Majesty will of course name the ministers who should serve in one and the other.

=== Independence ===
The independence movement for Venezuela began with the establishment of the Caracas Junta in 1810. After the Venezuelan Declaration of Independence in 1811, the provinces of Caracas, Cumaná, Barinas, Margarita, and the newly separated ones of Barcelona, Trujillo, and Mérida established a Republic of Venezuela, which claimed the area of the Captaincy General. The provinces of Maracaibo and Guayana, along with the city of Coro, rejected the republic, and after a year of war against the royalists, this First Republic collapsed. The provinces that had created the Venezuelan Republic were reconquered by Frigate Captain Domingo de Monteverde, who usurped power from the appointed Captain General Fernando Miyares. Because of this the Cortes of Cádiz erected the province of Maracaibo into a separate Captaincy General with Miyares at its head, but did ratify Monteverde as Captain General of the smaller Venezuela. During this period, the province of Maracaibo elected a representative to the Cortes, José Domingo Rus, who served from March 3, 1812, to May 10, 1814, and continued to represent the province before the crown after Ferdinand VII abolished the Cortes. With Ferdinand VII's return, Venezuela was reunited in one captaincy general.

In 1812 a new Audiencia appointed by the Cortes was able to return in Caracas. Under the leadership of Dominican-born Regent José Francisco Heredia (father of Cuban poet José María Heredia y Heredia), the Audiencia put up fierce resistance to Monteverde's attempts to rule the Captaincy General under martial law. After an interruption due to the restoration of the Republic and attempts by Pablo Morillo to suspend the Audiencia, both the Audiencia and the Captaincy General continued to function until 1821.

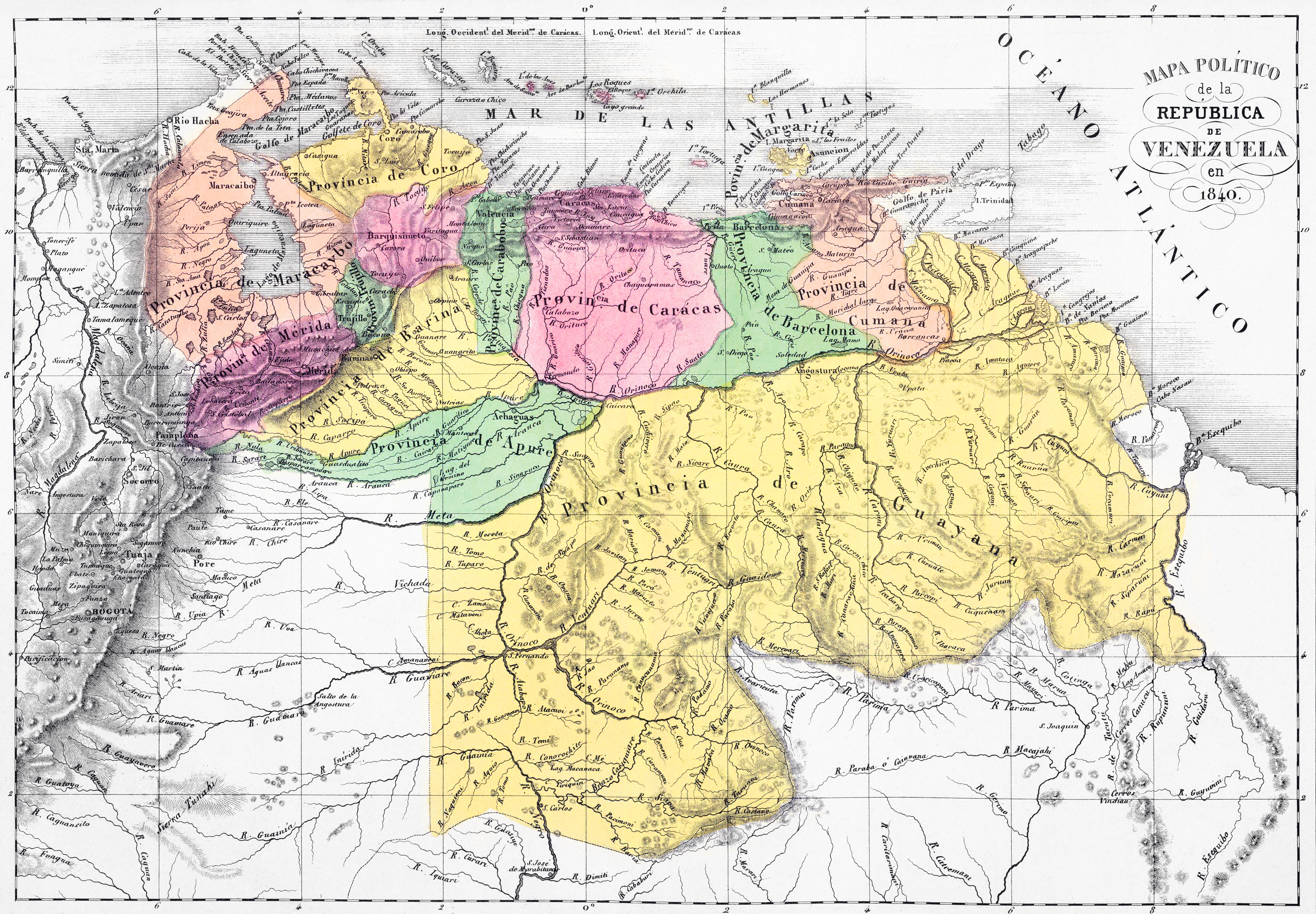
Political map of Venezuela in 1840

Independence for Venezuela was consolidated in 1821 as part of Gran Colombia. The Congress of Cucuta looked to the territorial area of former Viceroyalty of New Granada (during the period of 1739–1777) as the basis for its territorial claims, and created a state composed of regional departments. Venezuela became the Department of Venezuela through this territorial reorganization. The rising animosity between Venezuelans and New Granadians, due to irreconcilable differences in opinion as to how the new republic ought to be governed, led to the inevitable collapse of Gran Colombia in 1830. After 1830, the provinces within the old Captaincy General of Venezuela constituted the territory of the new independent republic of Venezuela.

== See also ==
- History of Venezuela
- Captaincy General
- Viceroyalty of New Granada
- First Republic of Venezuela
- Gran Colombia
- List of governors of Venezuela Province
