= Guayana Province =

Former province of Spanish Colonial Venezuela and independent Venezuela

Guayana Province Provincia de Guayana
- 1585–1864
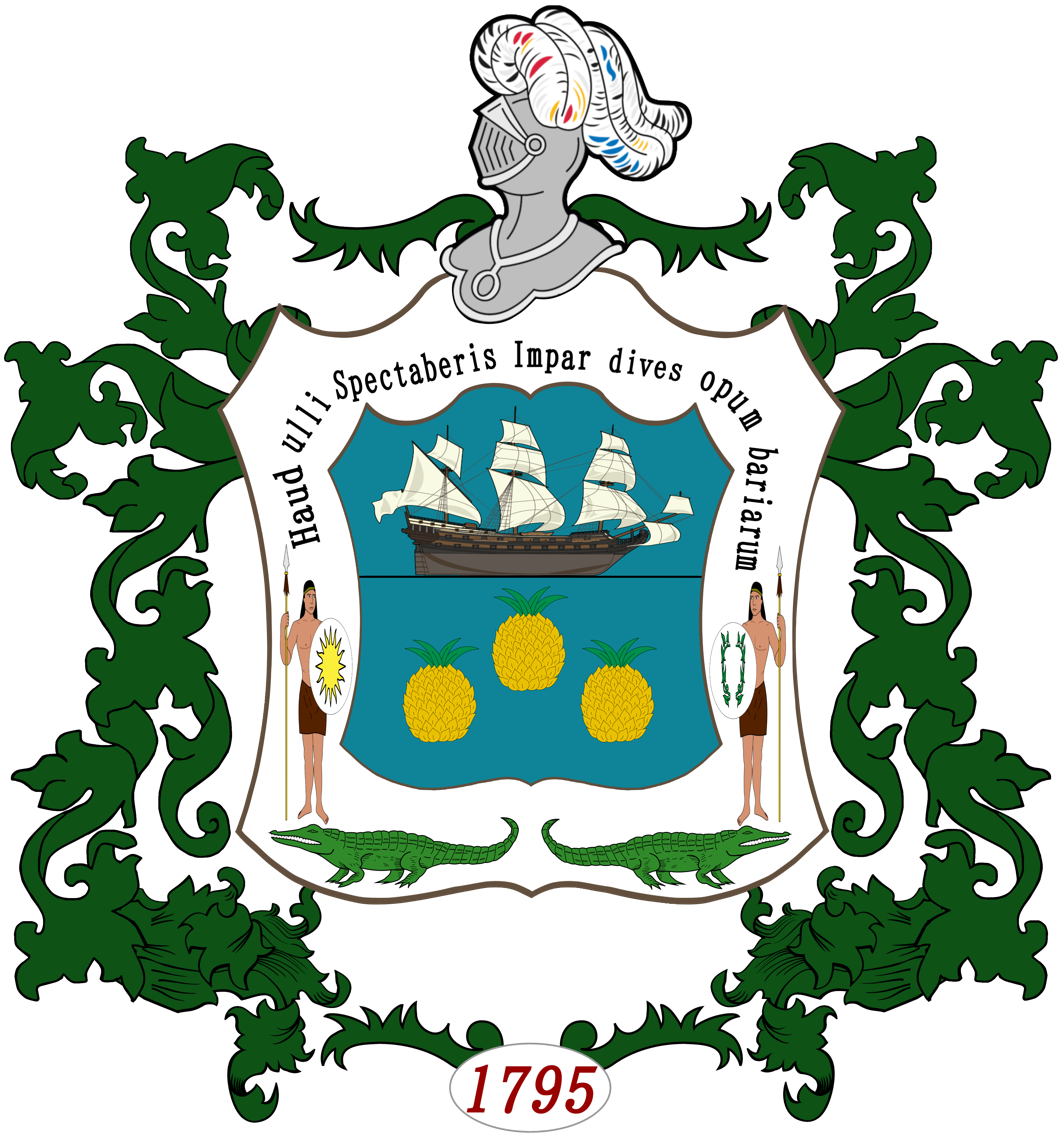
- Flag (Spanish Empire) Coat of arms

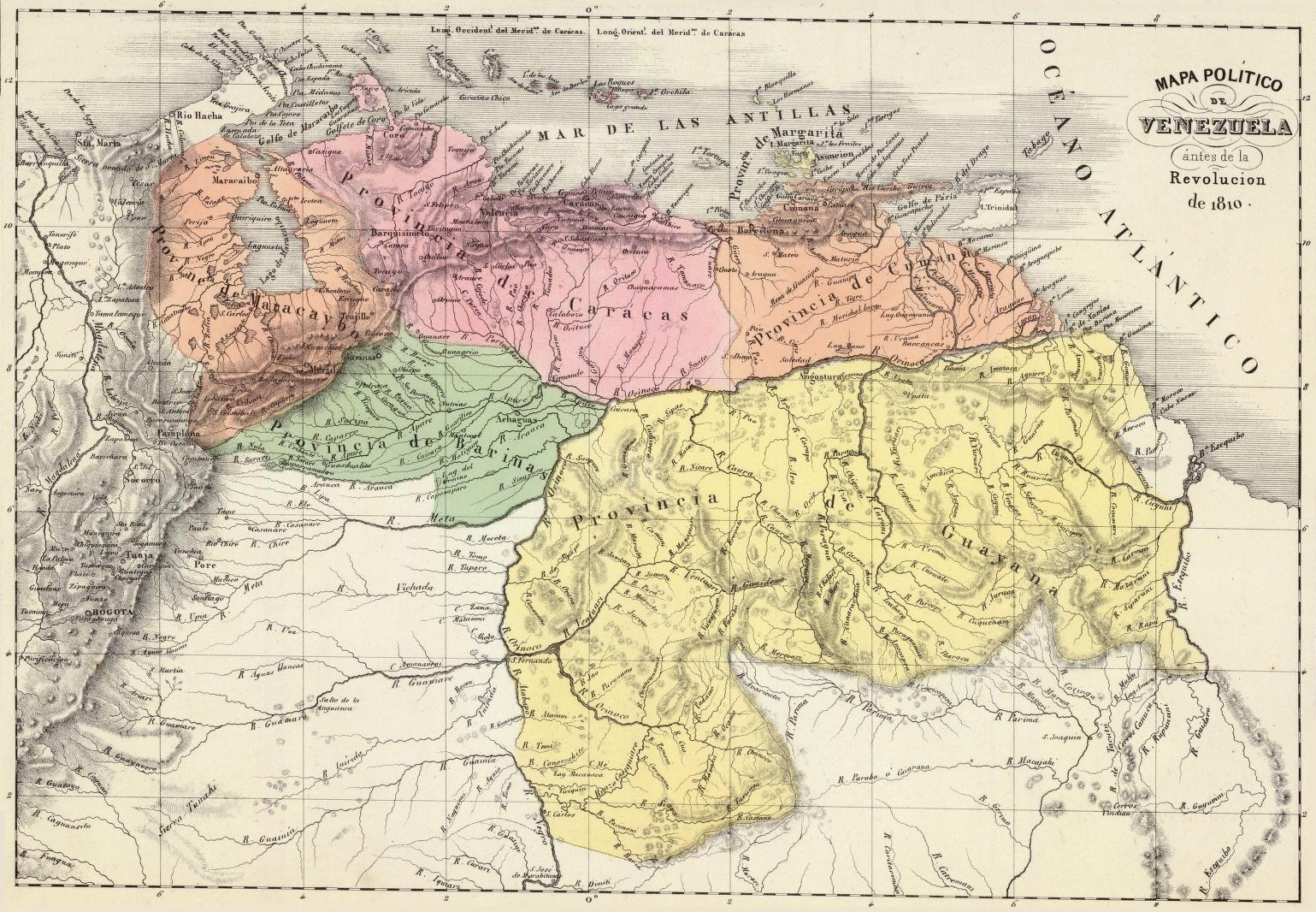
- Map of colonial Venezuela, with Guayana Province in yellow, published in 1810]
- Capital: Angostura
- Area
  - 1840: 469,671 km^{2} (181,341 sq mi)
- Population
  - 1840: 56,471
- Government
  - Type: Monarchy (until 1821)
- King
  - 1665–1700: Charles II
  - 1700–1724: Philip V
  - 1724: Louis I
  - 1724–1746: Philip V
  - 1746–1759: Ferdinand VI
  - 1759–1788: Charles III
  - 1788–1808: Charles IV
  - 1808–1833: Ferdinand VII (de jure)
- Historical era: Spanish colonization
  - Real cédula: 1585
  - Venezuelan Independence: 24 June 1821
  - Elevation to statehood: 1864
- Contained within
  - Empire: Spanish Empire
Preceded by	Succeeded by
Venezuela Province; New Andalusia Province	Guayana State
- Today part of: Venezuela; Guyana; Brazil

Guayana Province (1585−1864) was a province of Spanish Colonial Venezuela and independent Venezuela, located in the Guyana region of northeastern South America.

The province was part of independent Venezuela from 1821 to 1864.

== History ==
Guayana Province covered a territory roughly equal to the present day country of Guyana and the Venezuelan Guayana Region from 1591 to 1739, when the province's territory was merged into the Spanish Trinidad-Guayana Province, along with Trinidad Province (present day Trinidad and Tobago).

Amazonas is named after the Amazon River, and was formerly part of the Spanish Viceroyalty of Peru, a region called Spanish Guyana. It was settled by the Portuguese in the early 18th century and incorporated into the Portuguese Empire after the Treaty of Madrid in 1750. It became a state of the Brazilian Republic in 1889.

Guayana Province was within the Spanish colonial New Andalusia Province from its establishment in 1585 to 1776, when it was incorporated into the new Captaincy General of Venezuela. It was also within the larger jurisdiction of the Viceroyalty of New Granada (1717–1819).

After the Venezuelan War of Independence (1811–1823) it was a province in the new nation of Venezuela until 1864.

== Maps ==
Cantons of Guayana Province in 1840

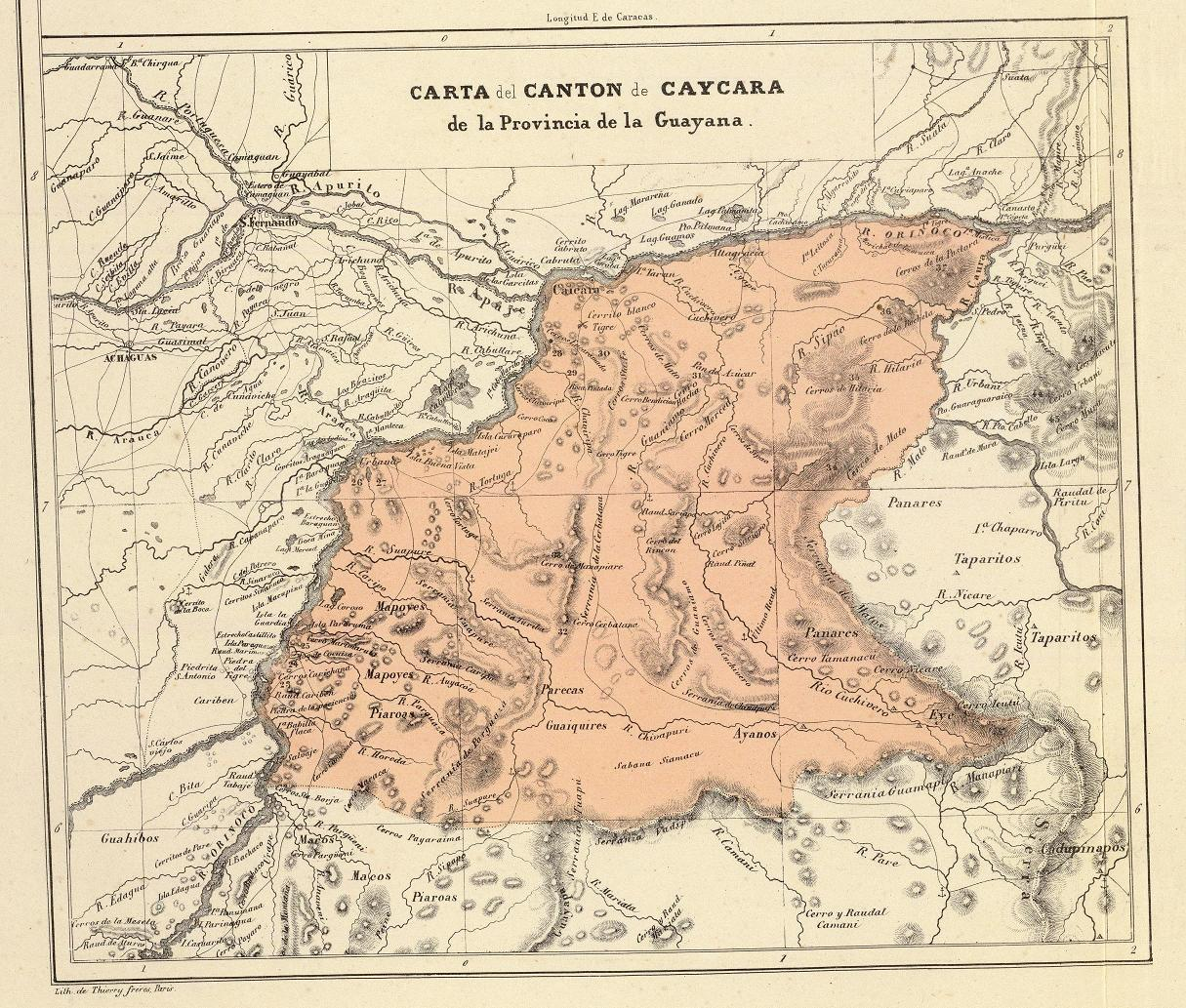
Cantón Caycara (now western Bolívar State)

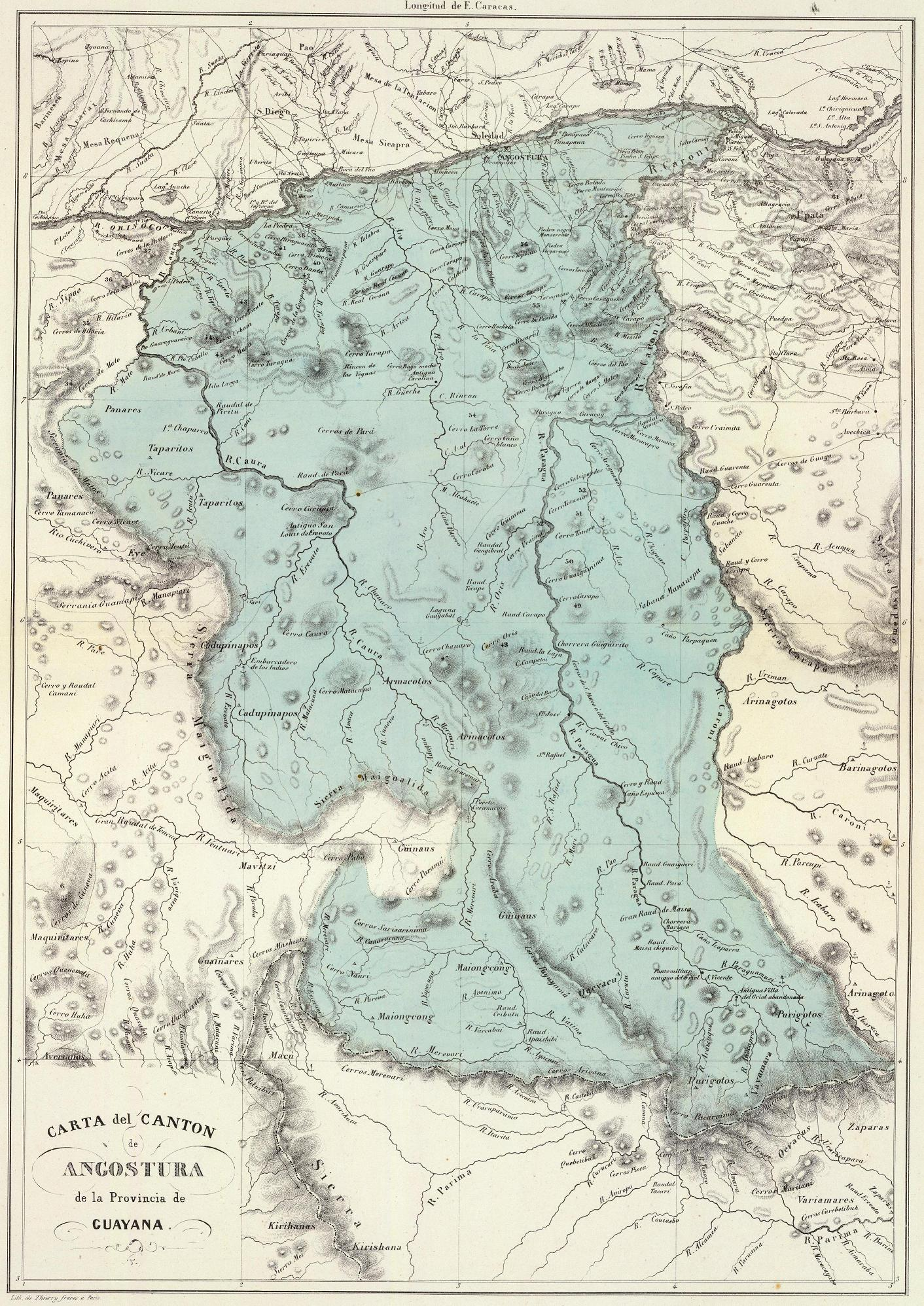
Cantón Angostura (now central Bolívar State)

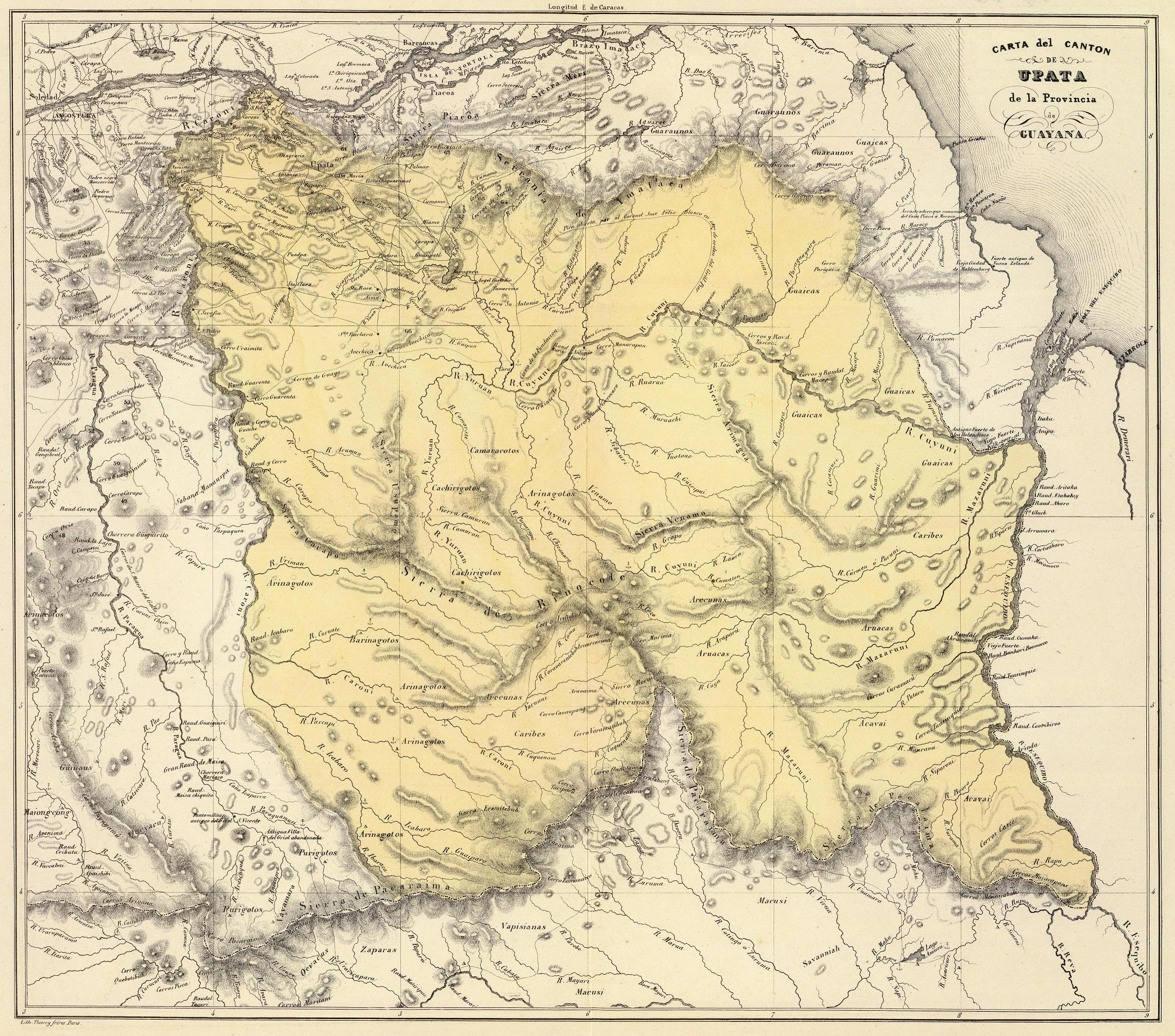
Cantón Upata (now eastern Bolívar State)

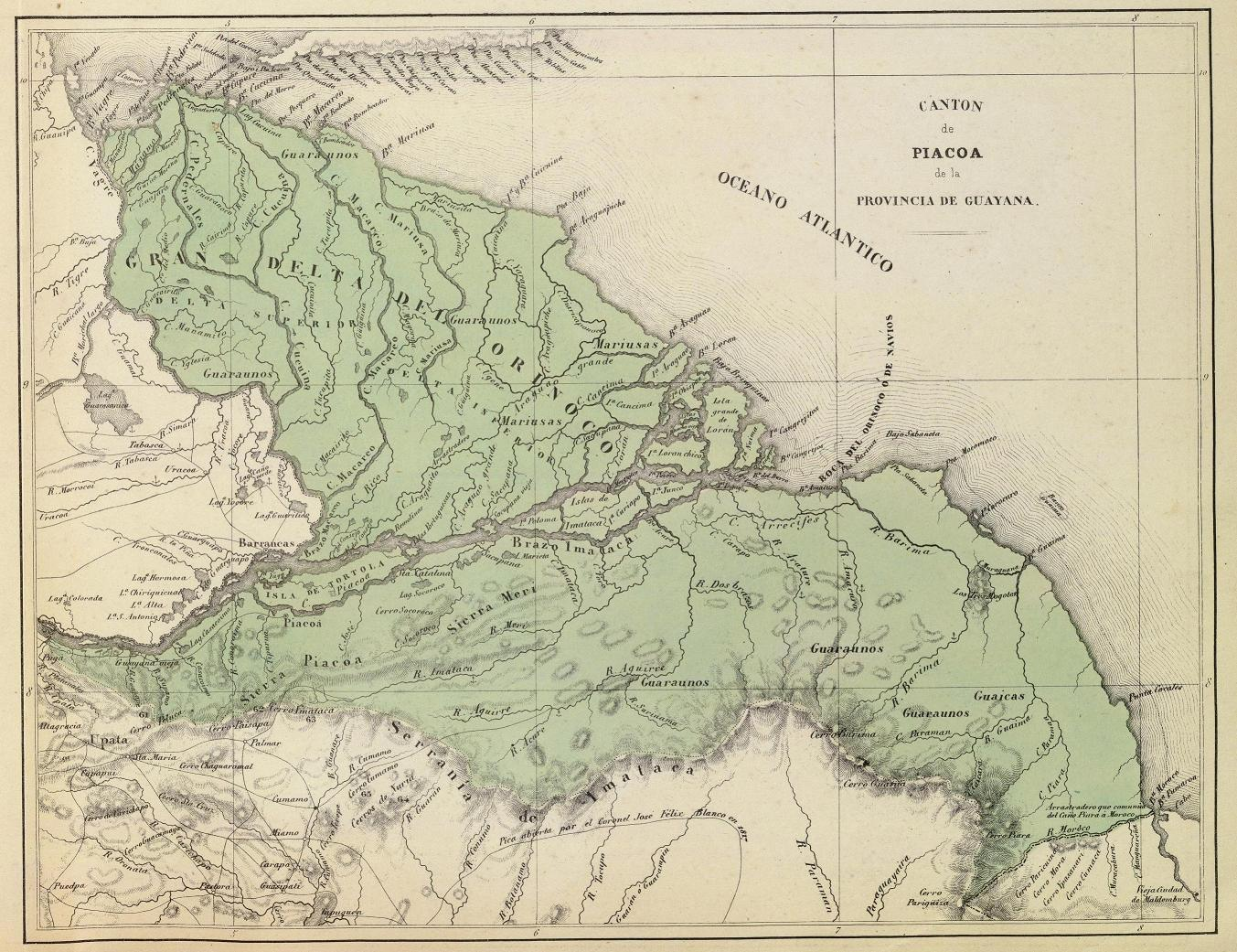
Cantón Piacoa (now Delta Amacuro, previously part of colonial New Andalusia Province)

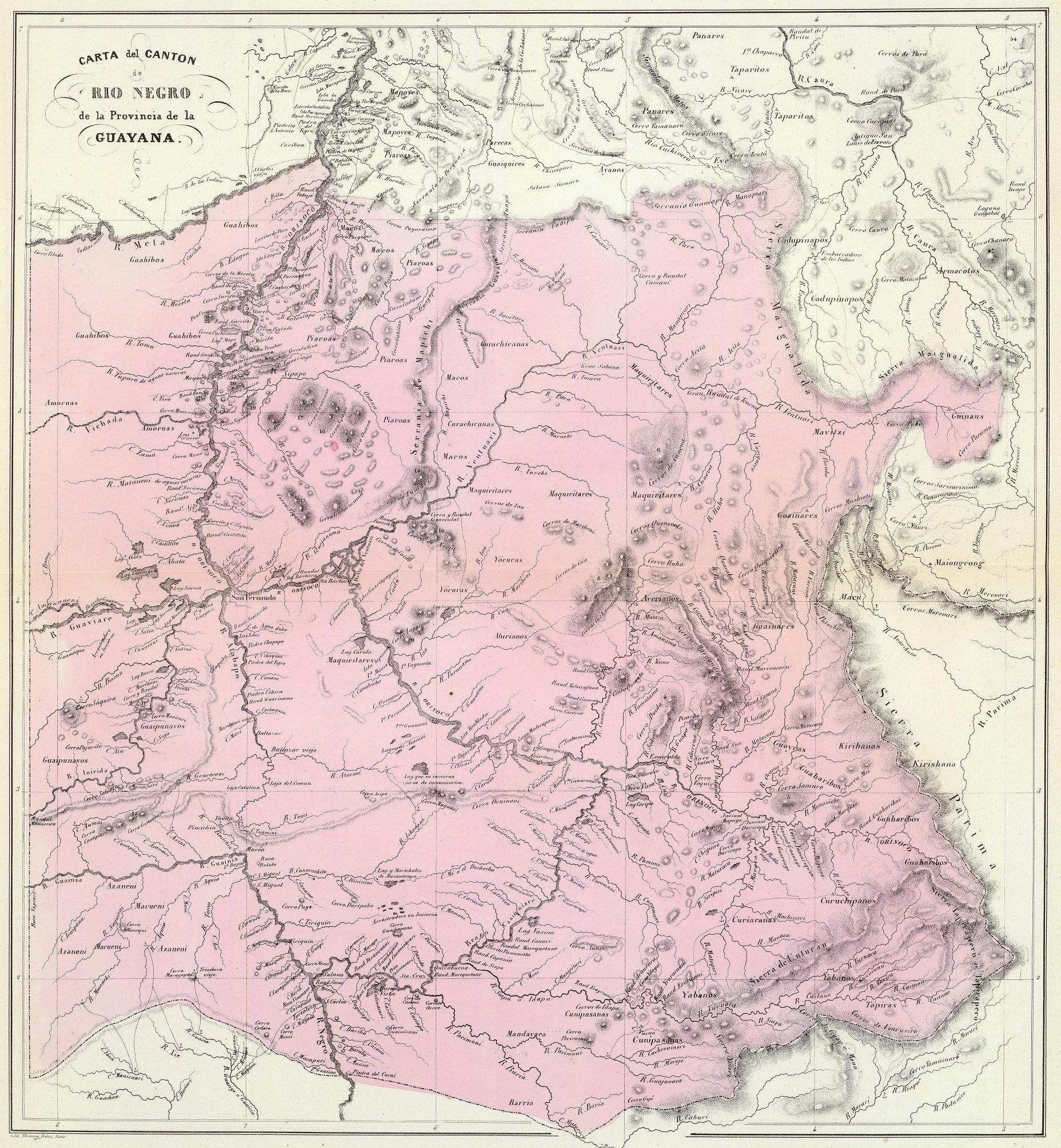
Cantón Rionegro (now Amazonas State)

== See also ==
- History of Guyana
- Colonial Venezuela
  - Governorate of New Andalusia (1501–13)
  - New Andalusia Province (1537–1864)
  - Captaincy General of Venezuela (1777–1823)
