= Museo de las Casas Reales =

Dominican historical monument

Museo De Las Casas Reales
- Museo de las Casas Reales
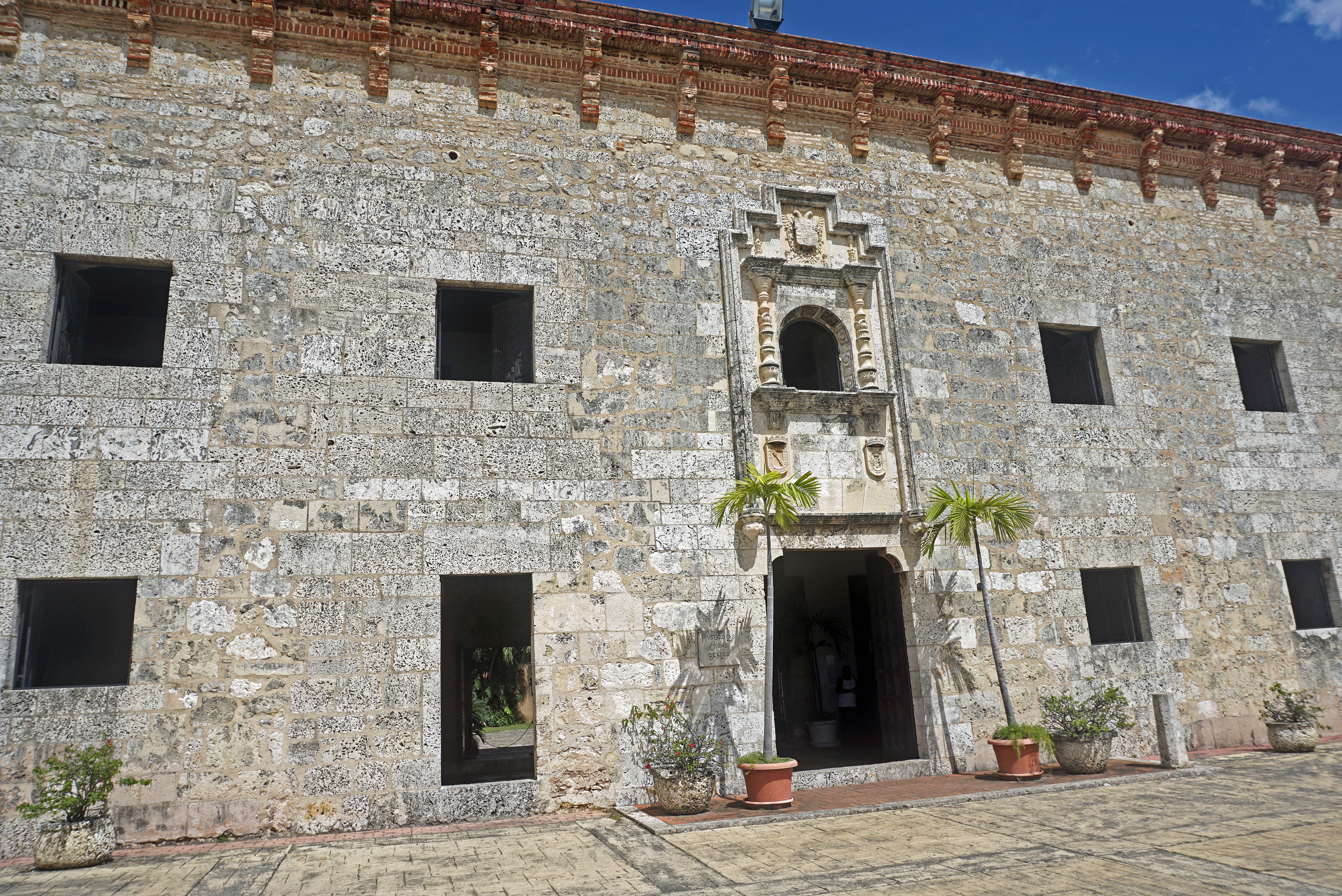
- Entrance of the Museo de las Casas Reales in the Colonial district of Santo Domingo
- Established: 1973
- Location: Santo Domingo, Dominican Republic
- Coordinates: 18.475883°N 69.883208°W
- Type: Historical and Cultural
- Director: Elizabeth Hazim de Vásquez
- Website: educando.edu.do

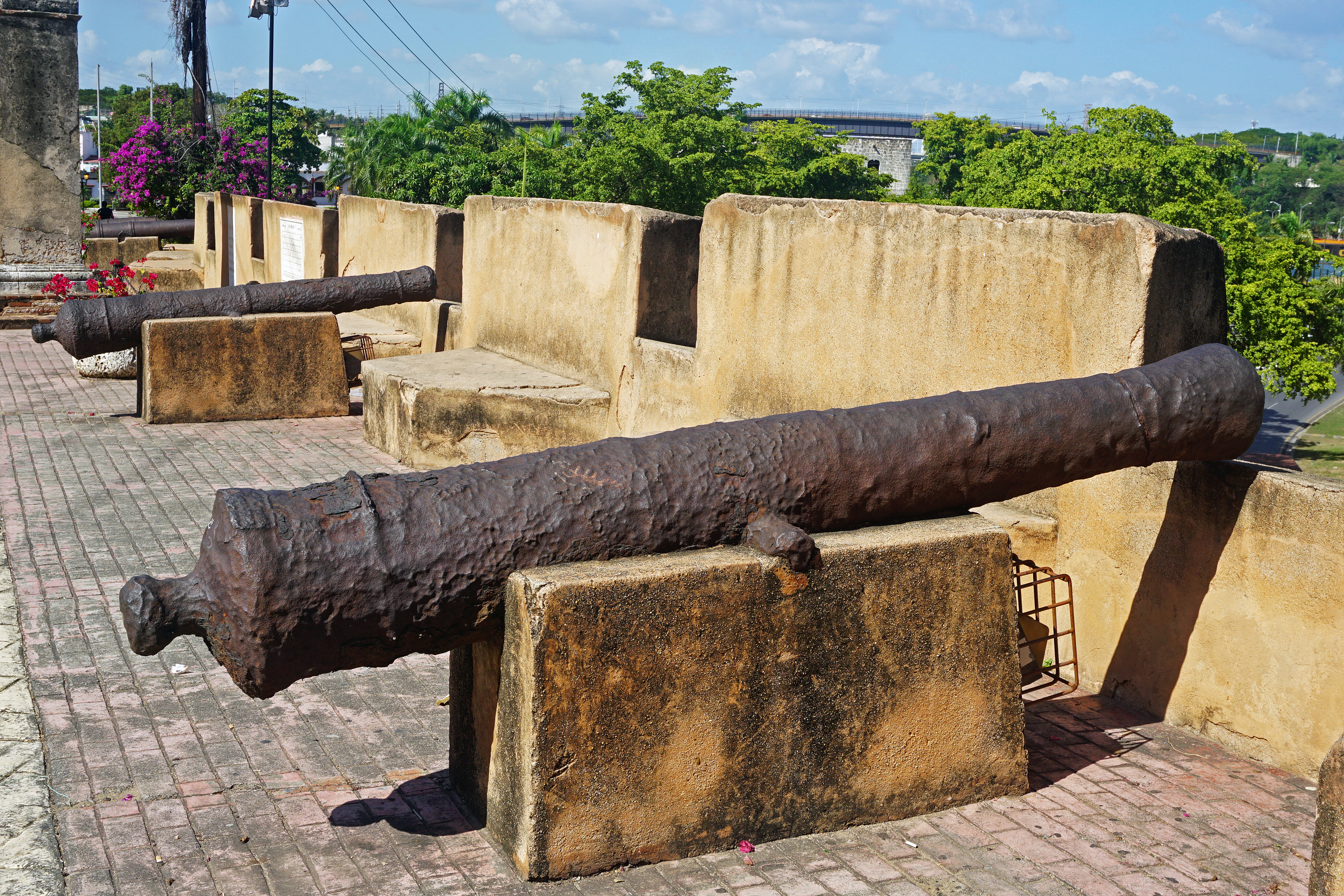
Old colonial cannons in the Museo de las Casas Reales

The Museo de las Casas Reales (English: Museum of the Royal Houses) is one of the important cultural monuments built during the colonial era in Hispaniola, now the Dominican Republic. It is located in the Colonial district of Santo Domingo.

It was the Palace of the Real Audiencia of Santo Domingo, called then Edificio de las Casas Reales, and it is the first (oldest) headquarters of Spanish power in the New World.

The building dates back to the sixteenth century, and was built to house the administrative offices of the Spanish colonies in the Americas, at the time any trespassers would be sentenced to death.

It is part of the UNESCO World Heritage Site called Colonial City of Santo Domingo.

== History ==
The palace was built by orders of the Spanish Crown, represented by King Ferdinand II of Aragon, on October 5 of 1511 to house the main government offices of the colony in two interconnected buildings (hence the plural Casas Reales). In the first (South) section was the Royal Audiencia, the first court of the New World, as well as the office of the Comptroller General. The second (North) section was used by the successive Viceroys, Governors and Captains-General.

The original architectural structure has undergone a number of changes through the country's history. In 1807, during the period of French sovereignty over the Eastern part of Hispaniola, French general Louis Ferrand gave the facade a classical architectural style. During the last year of government of President Carlos Felipe Morales, some changes were made to use the building as the Governmental Palace. The Presidency later moved to a mansion on the site of today's Palacio Nacional. During the government of Rafael Leónidas Trujillo other modifications were made in order to house government offices. Trujillo's office, and an extensive collection of arms and armor that he purchased, remain on display.

The building was later restored to its original 16th-century appearance and was established on October 18, 1973, during the administration of President Joaquín Balaguer, as a museum to highlight the history, life and customs of the inhabitants of the Spanish colony. However, it was not officially opened until May 31, 1976. Attending the opening ceremony was King Juan Carlos I of Spain. A self-guided tour giving a sequential history of the island includes a portable audio speaker that is available in various languages. It is currently one of the most visited sites in Santo Domingo.

== Rooms ==
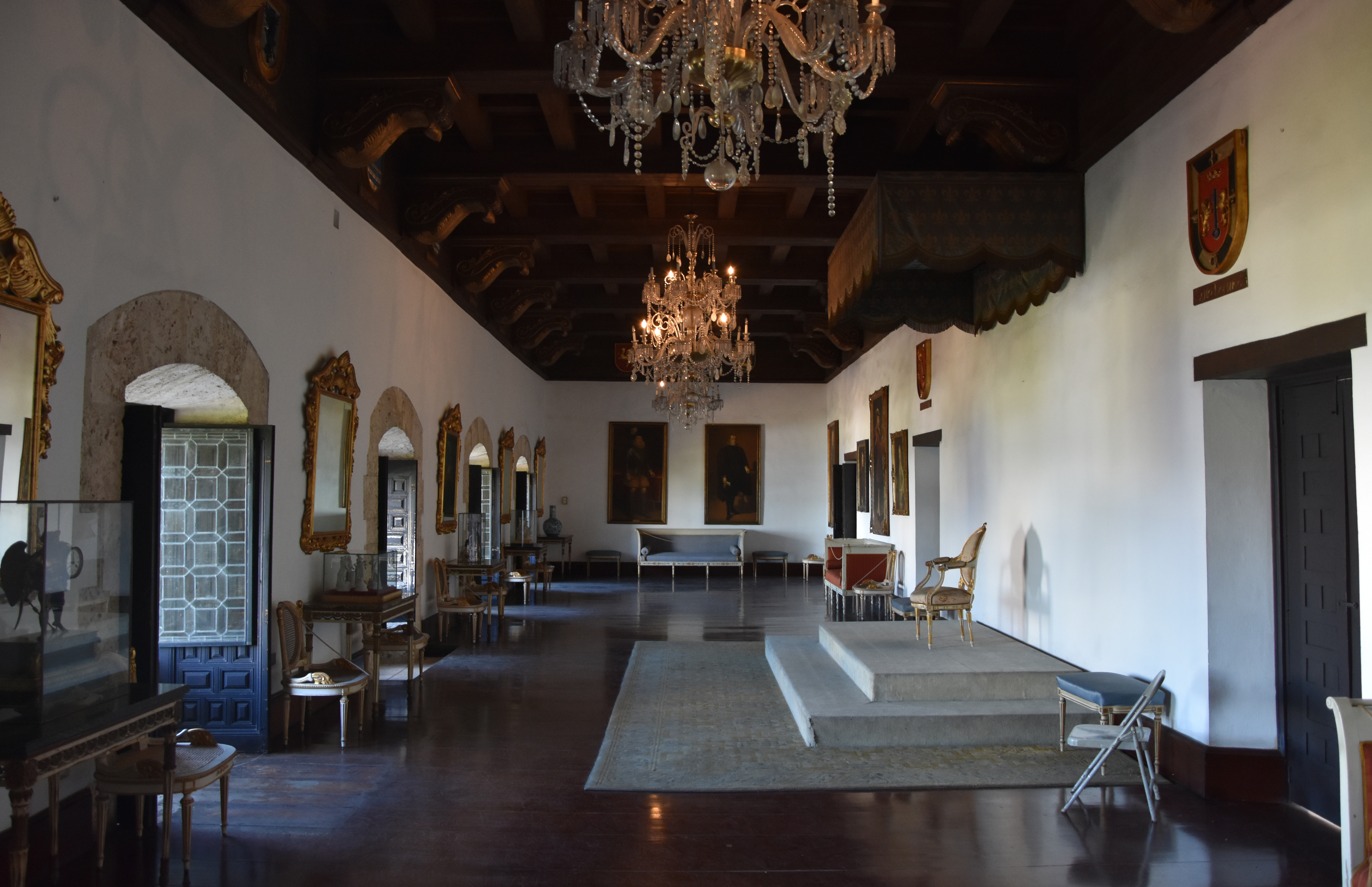
Interior of Museo de las Casas reales.

- Comptroller-General
- Legislation
- Secretaries of the Audiencia
- Office of the Chief Judge
- Waiting Hall
- Chamber of the Chief Judge
- Vestibule of the Captain
- Office of the Captain General
- Family Life
- Historical Ceramics
- Military I
- Military II
- Great Hall of the Governors

== Gallery ==
=== Courtyard ===
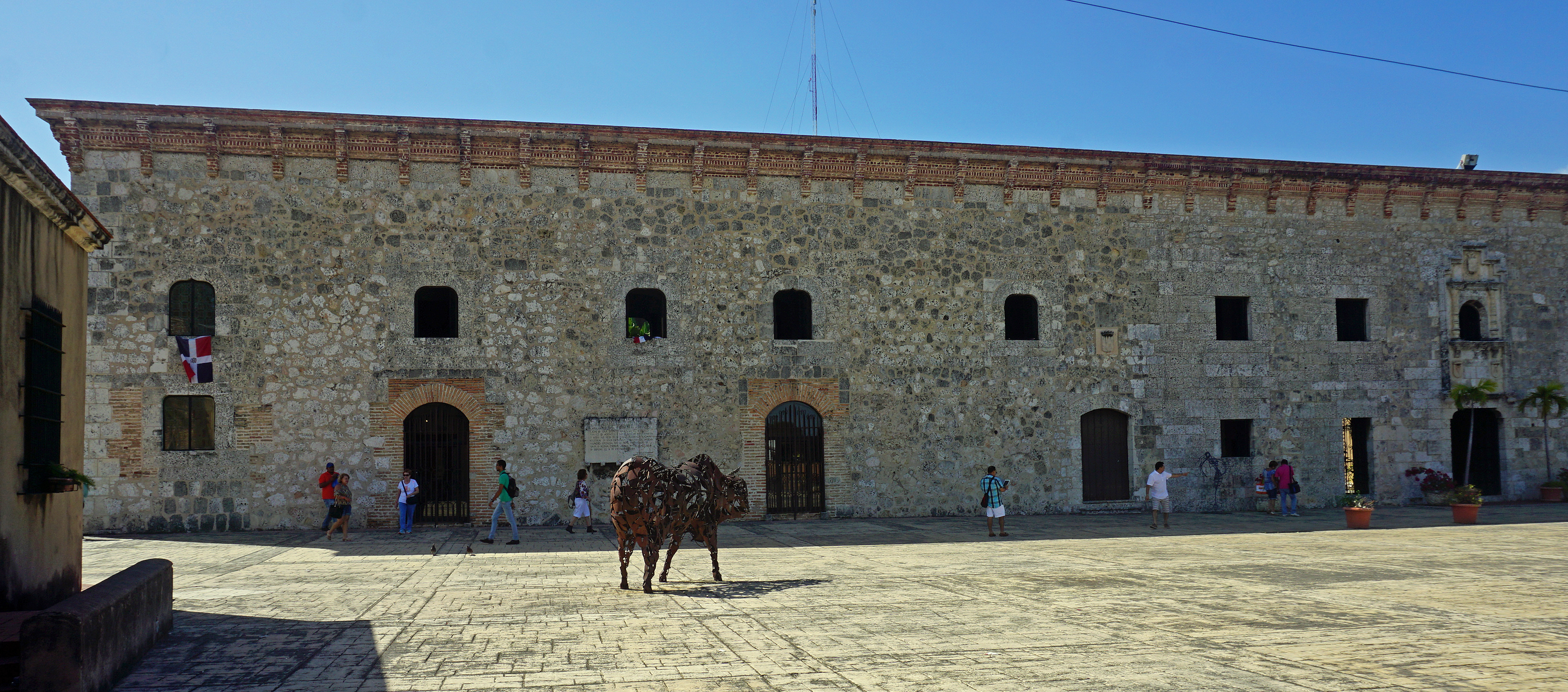

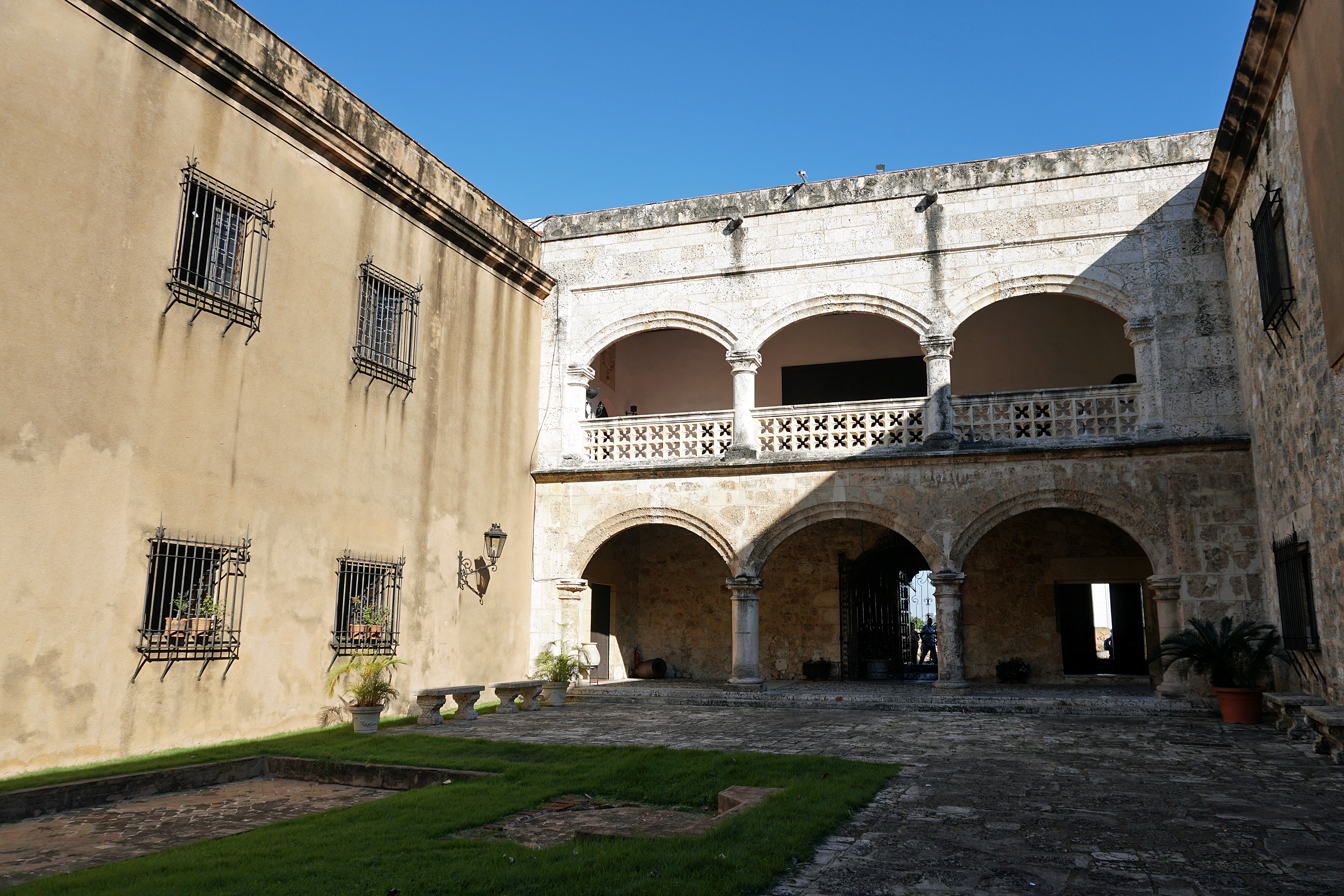

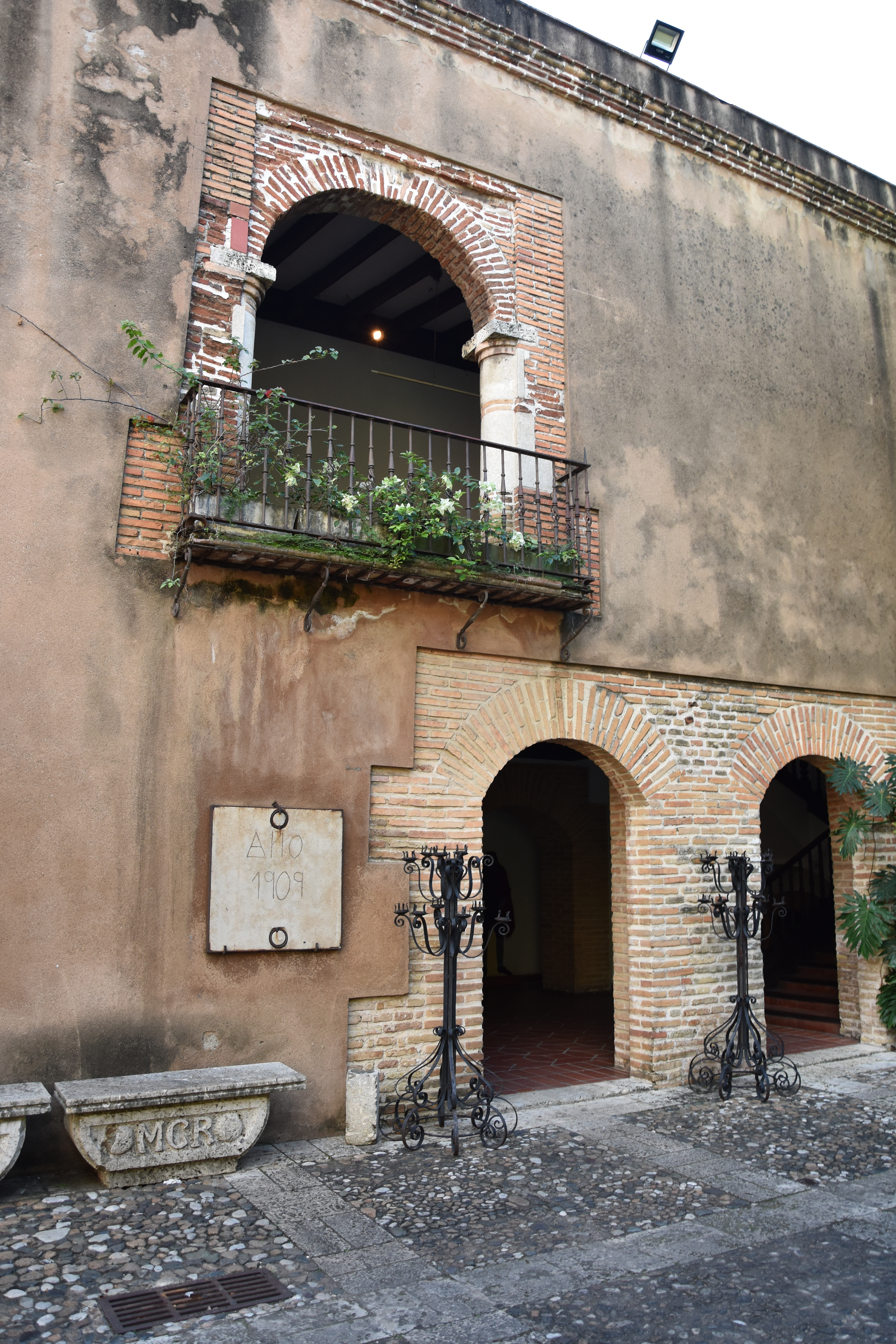

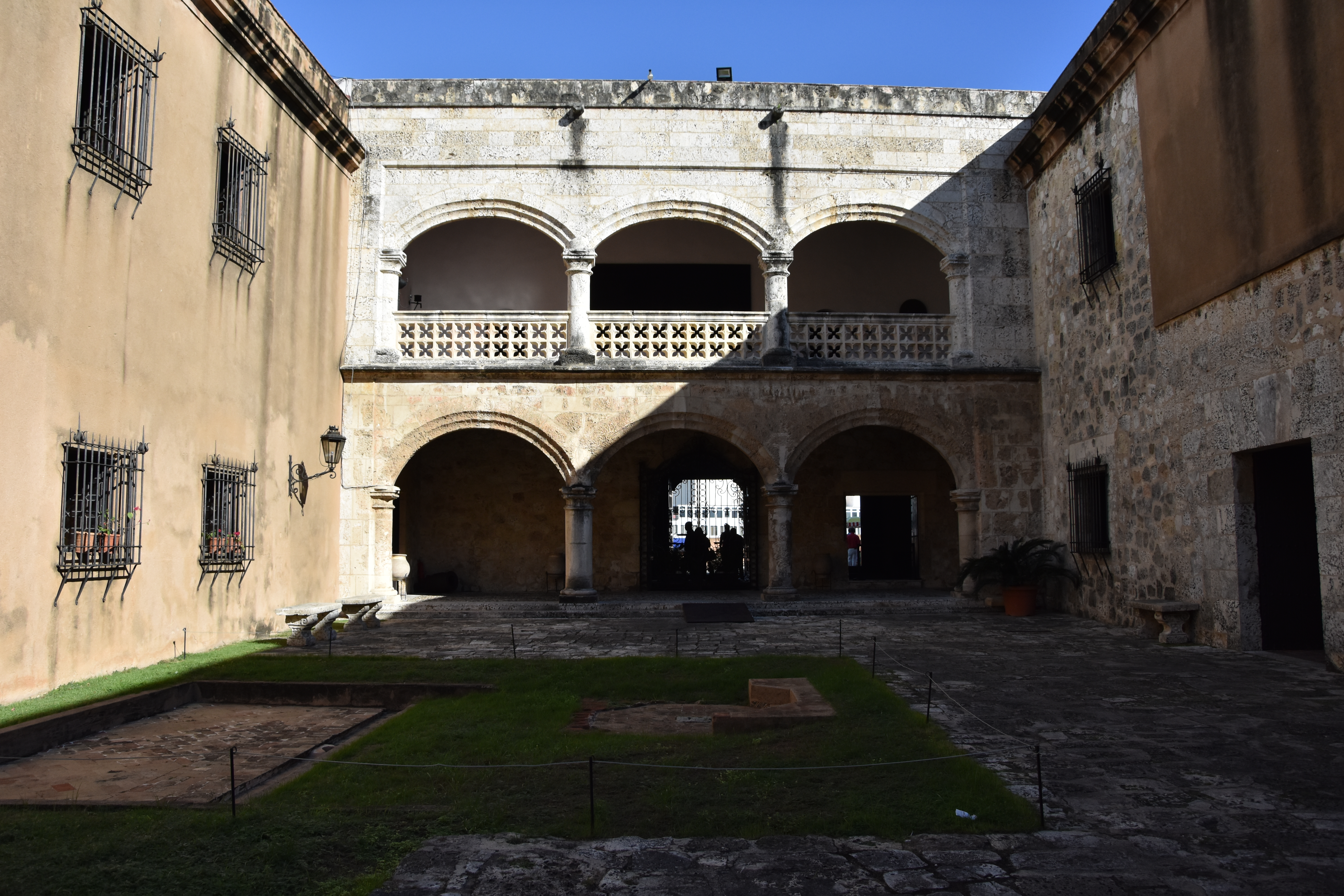

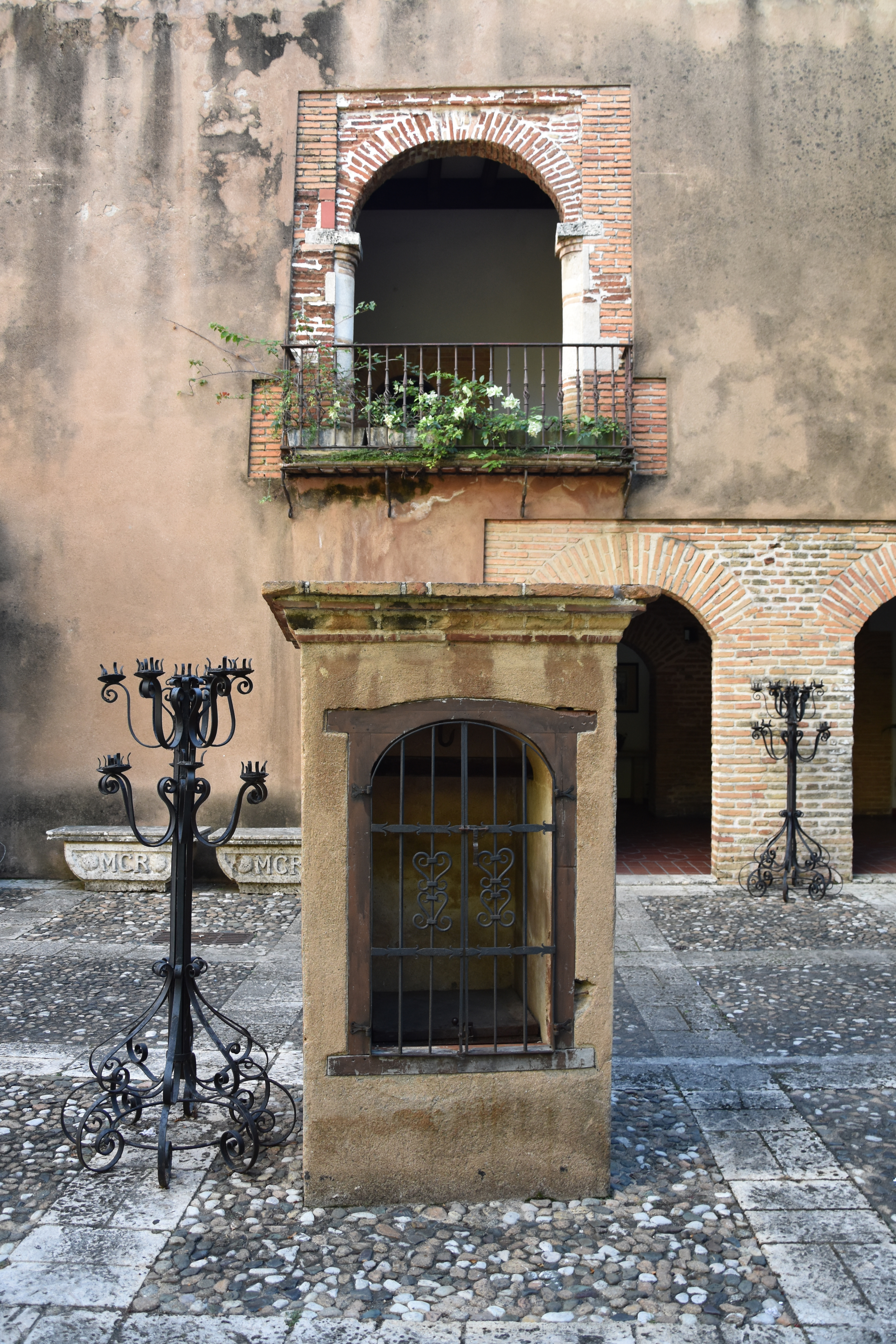

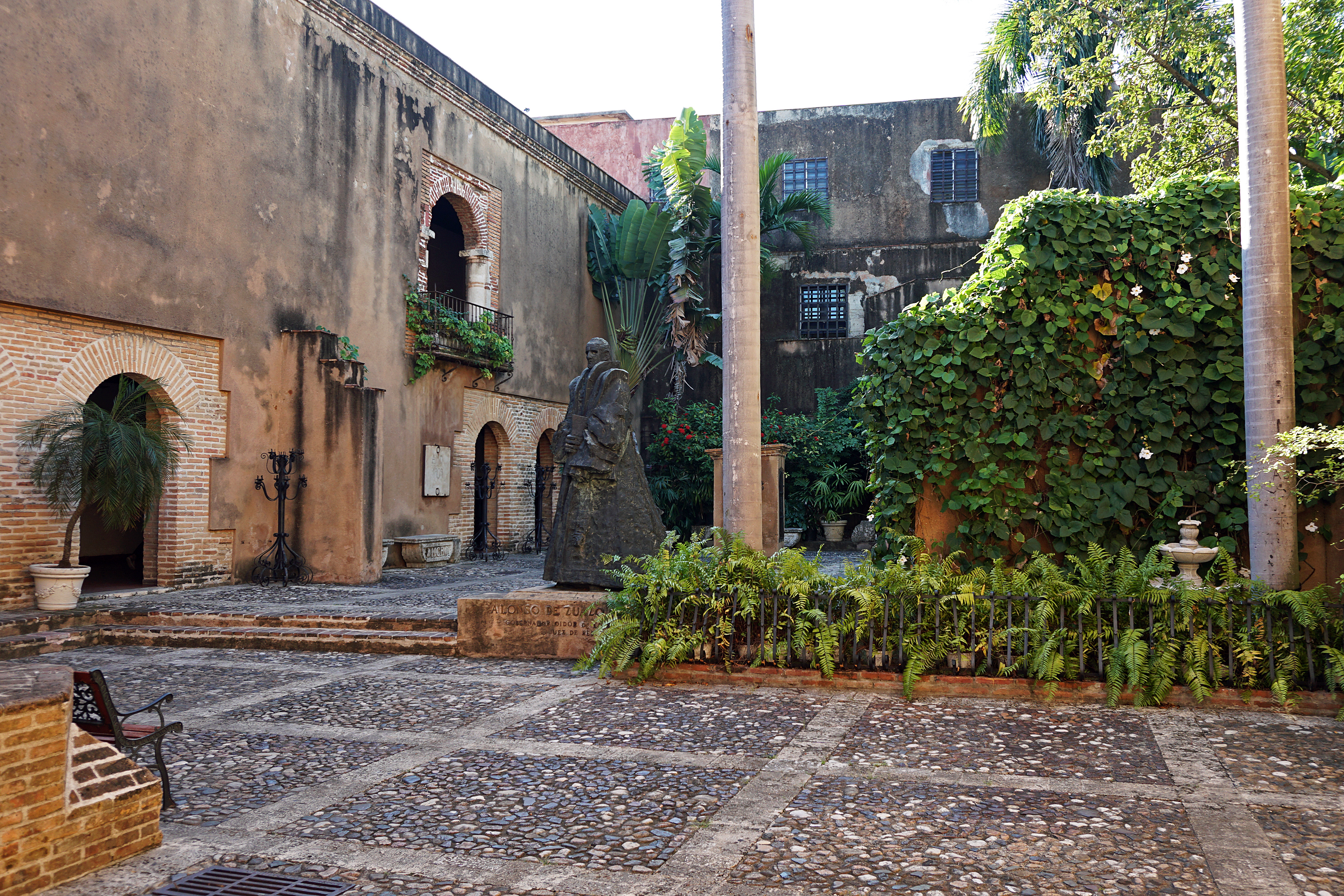

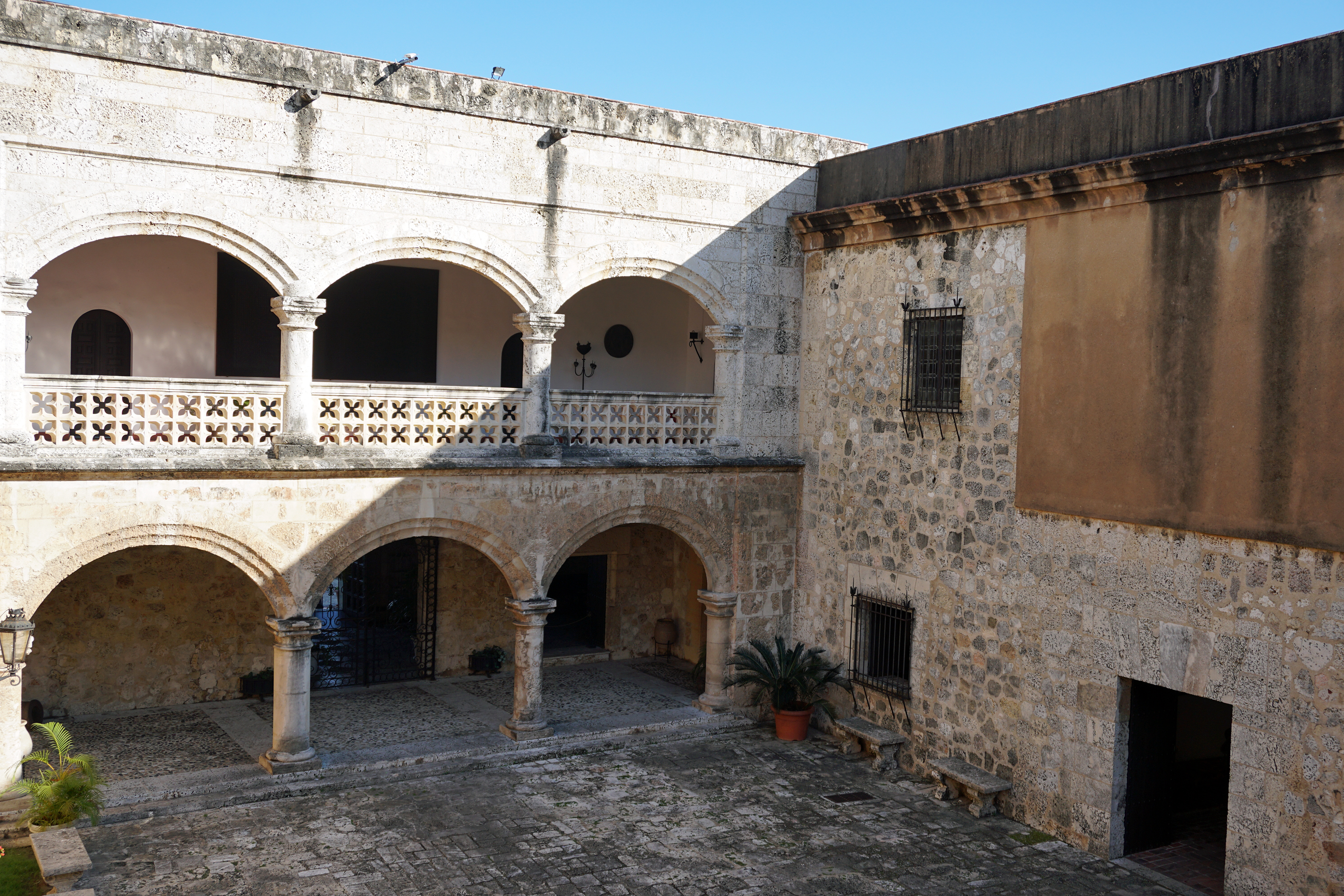

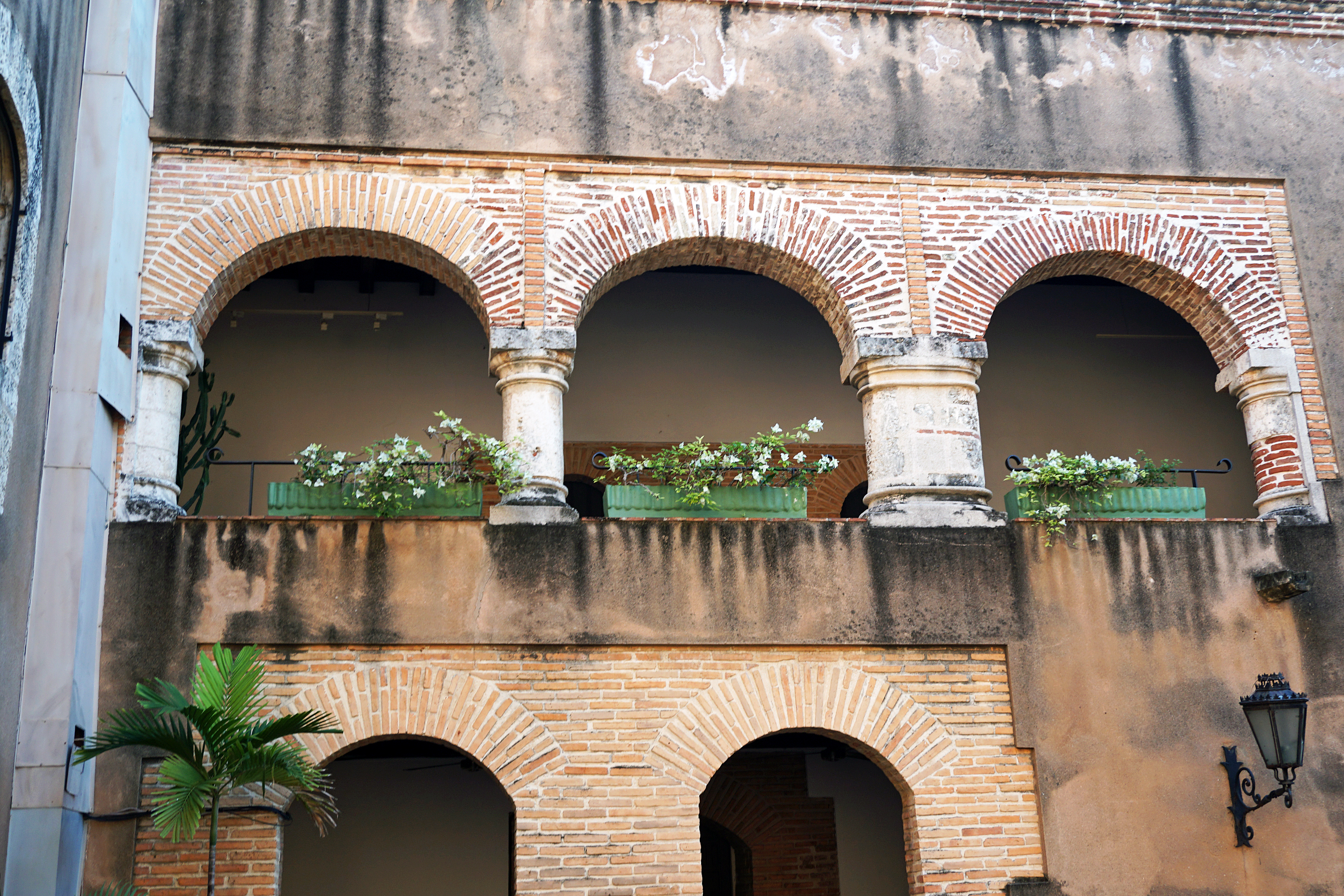

=== Weapons and armor ===
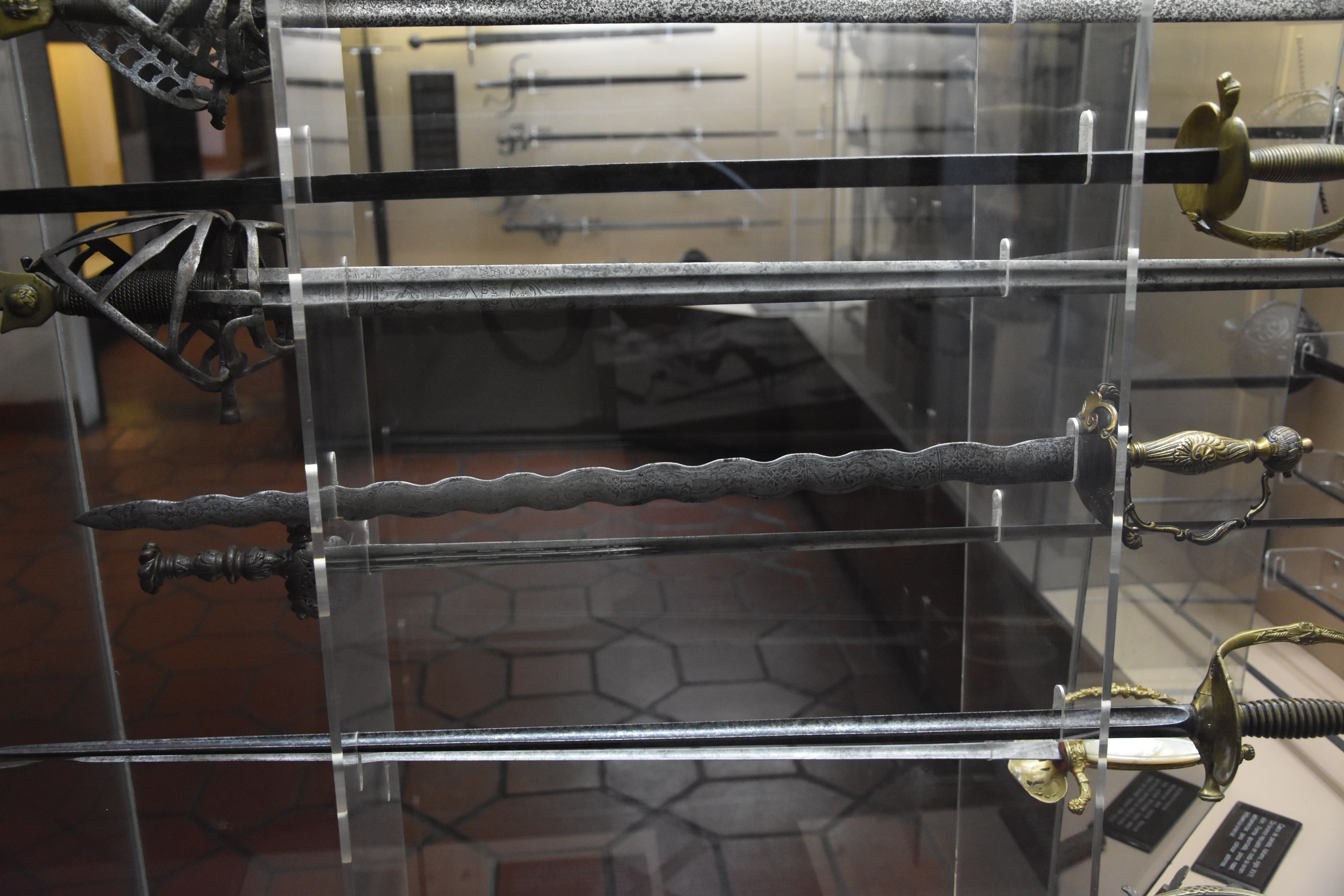

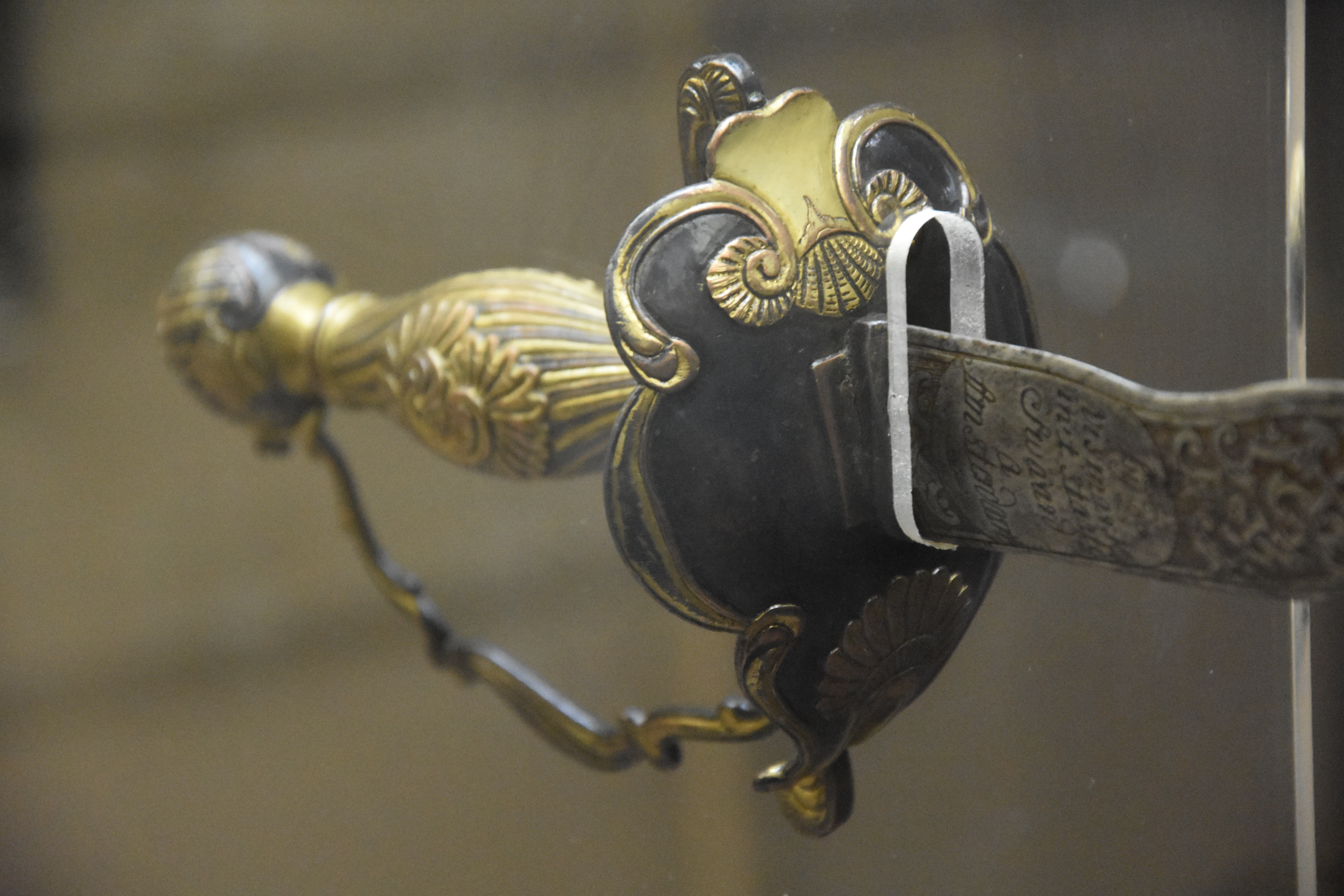

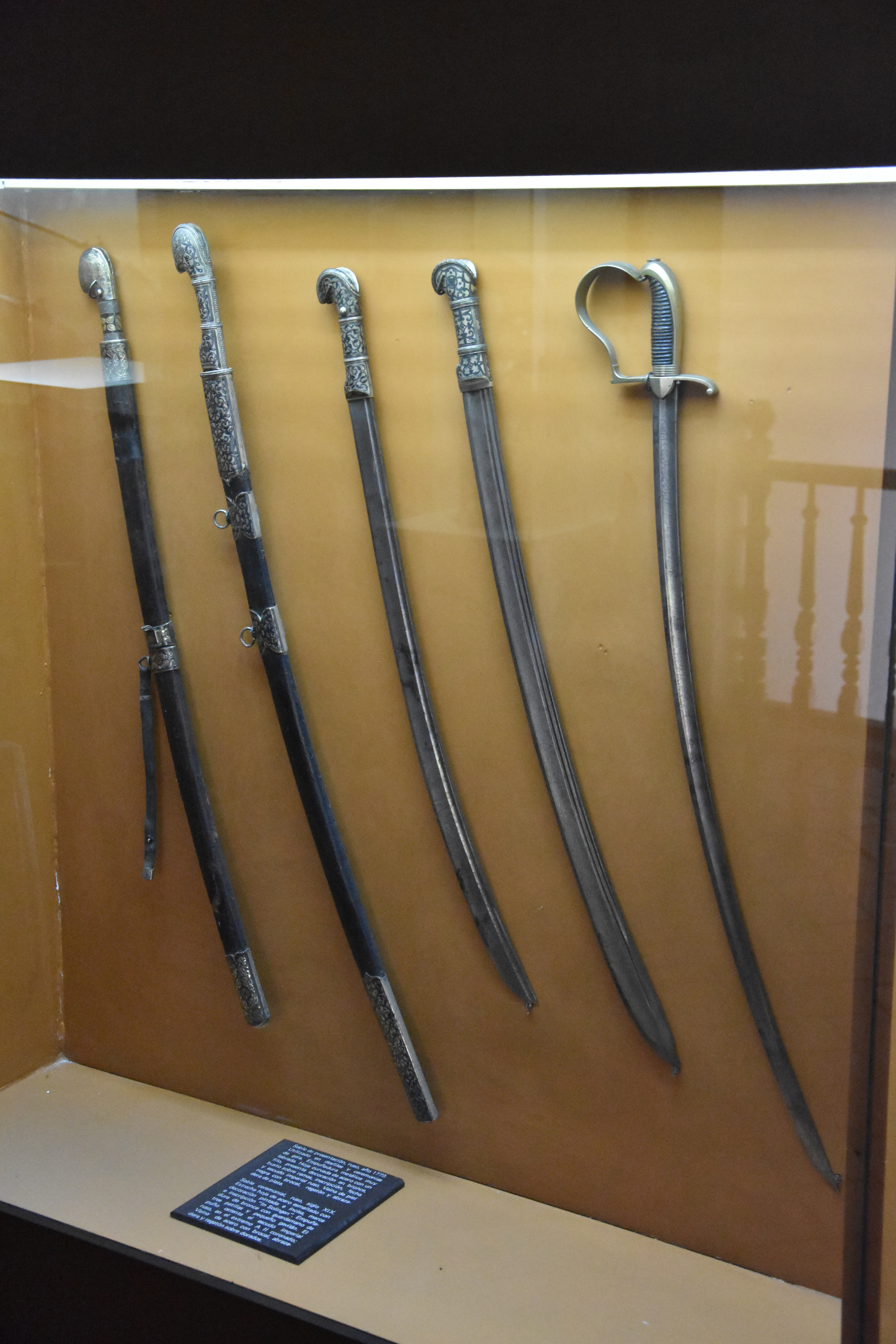

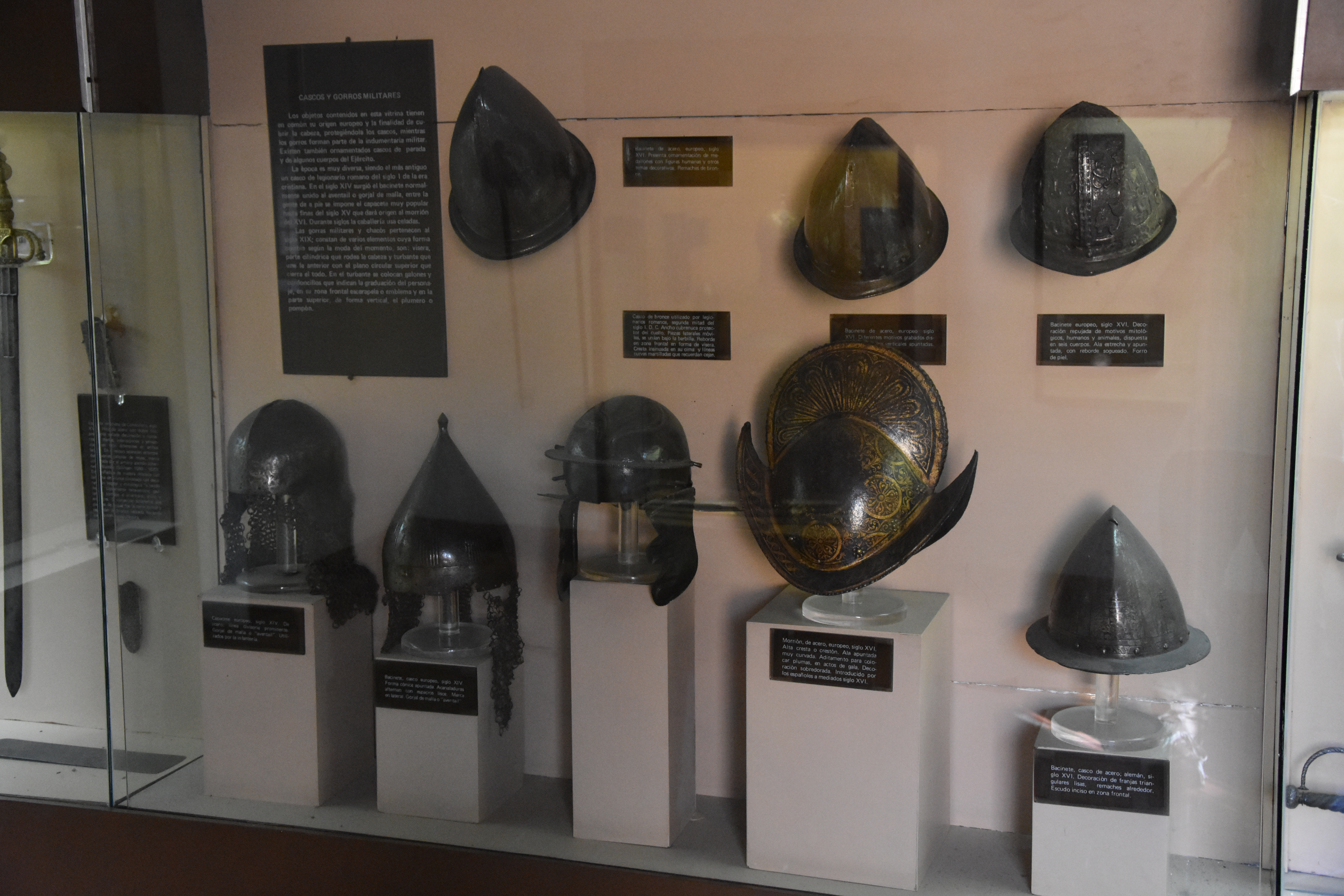

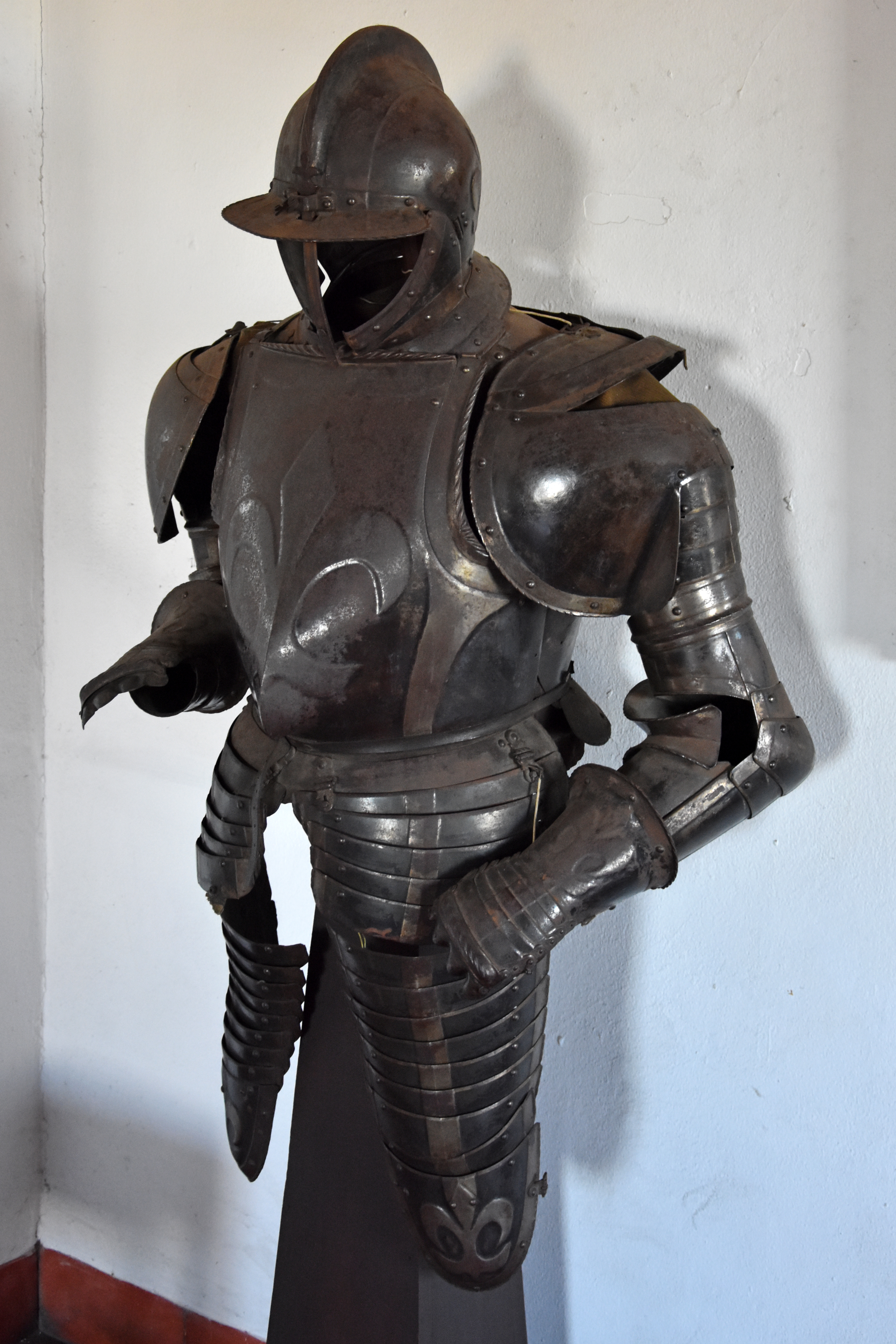

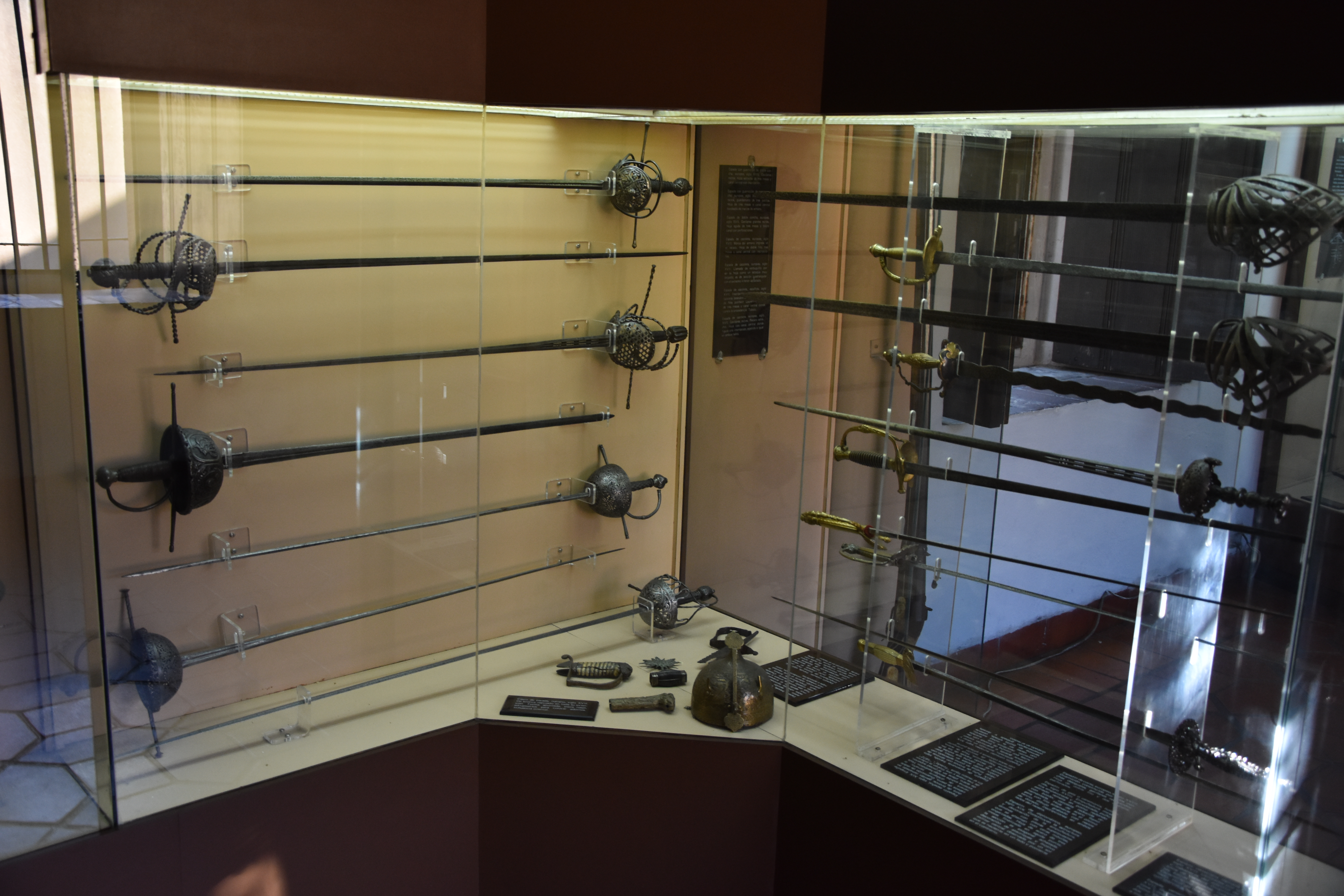

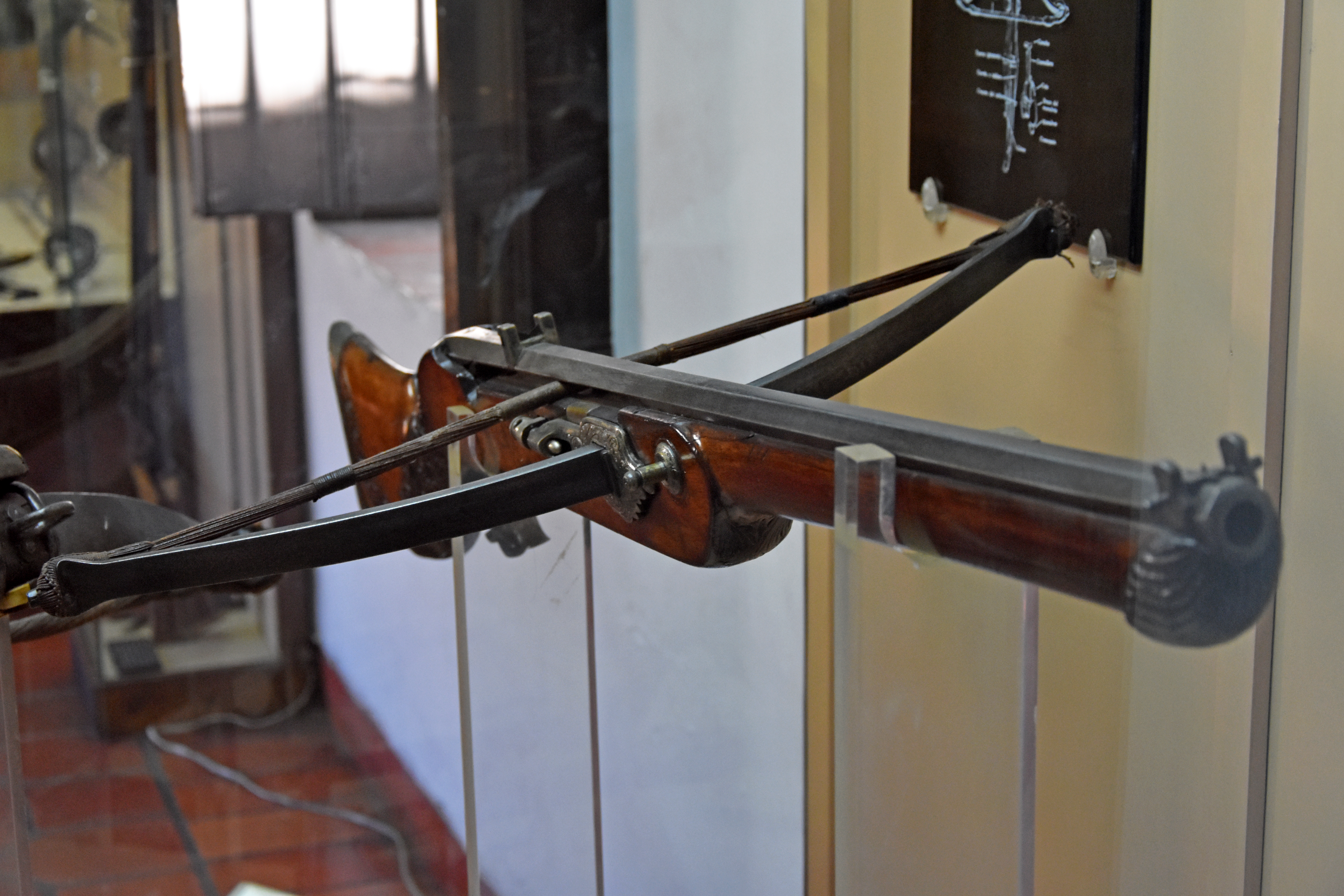

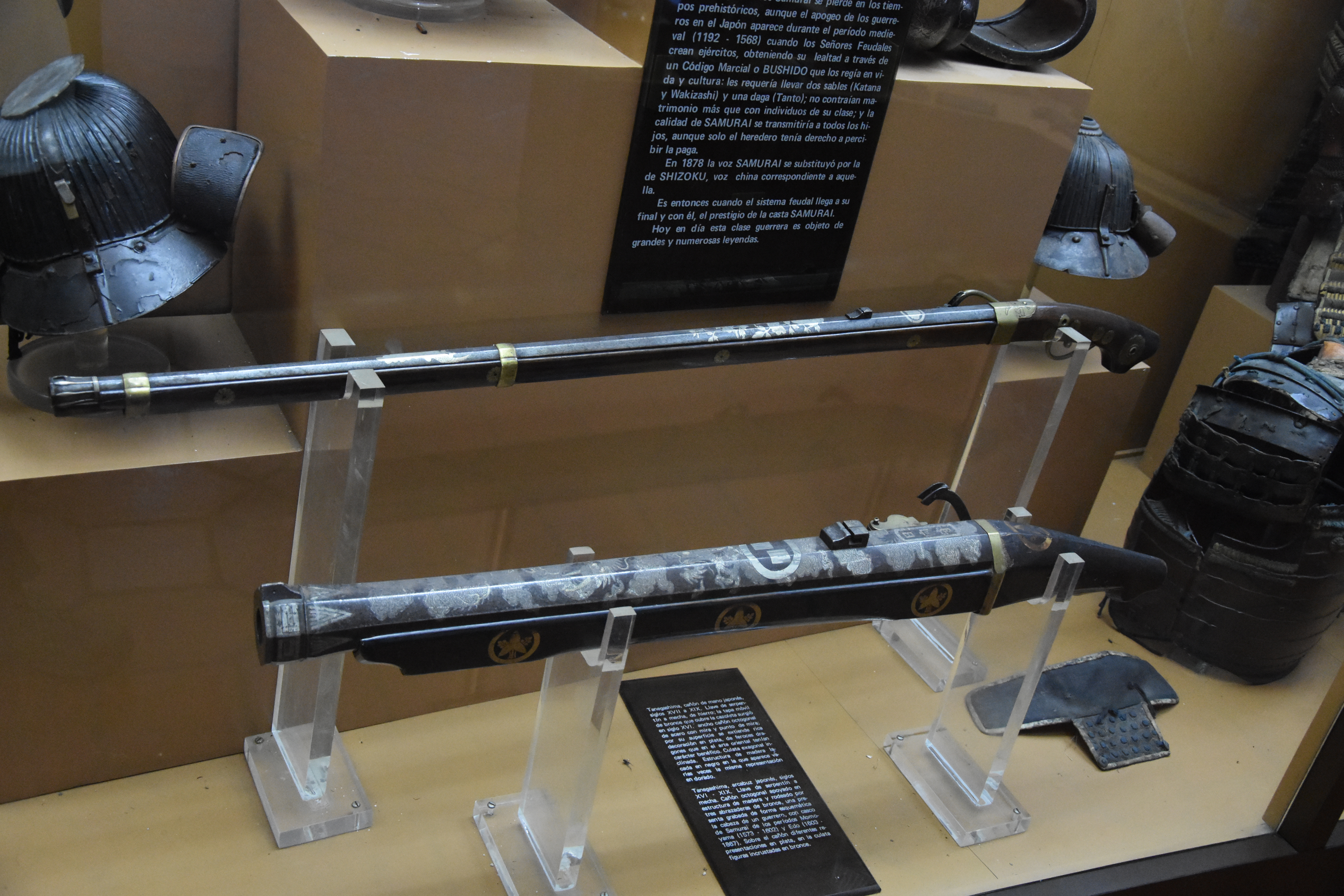

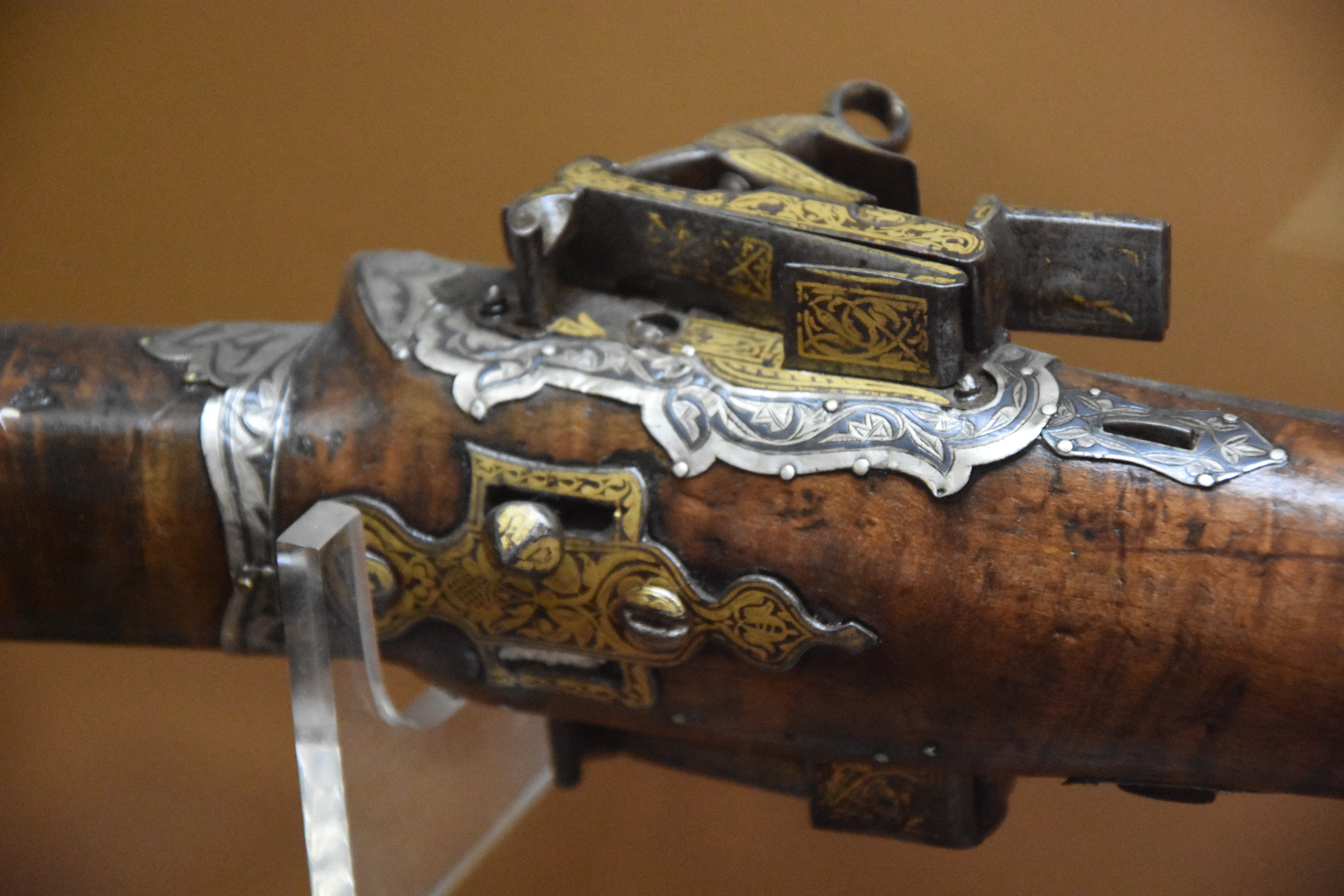

== See also ==
- List of colonial buildings in Santo Domingo
- Ciudad Colonial (Santo Domingo)
- Captaincy General of Santo Domingo
- Royal Audiencia of Santo Domingo
- History of the Dominican Republic
