= Real Audiencia of Santo Domingo =

First court of the Spanish crown in America

Real Audiencia of Santo Domingo Real Audiencia de Santo Domingo
- Real Audiencia of the Kingdom of Spain
- 1511-1865
- Capital: Santo Domingo
  - Type: Audiencia Real
- Historical era: Spanish Empire
  - Established: 29 August 1511
  - Real Audiencia abolished: 24 May 1865
  - Restoration of Dominican Republic: 1865
- Today part of: Dominican Republic, Venezuela, Cuba, Puerto Rico Florida

The Real Audiencia of Santo Domingo (transl. "Royal Audience of Santo Domingo") was the first court of the Spanish crown in America. It was created by Ferdinand V of Castile in his decree of 1511, but due to disagreements between the governor of Hispaniola, Diego Colon and the Crown, it was not implemented until it was reestablished by Charles V in his decree of September 14, 1526. This audiencia would become part of the Viceroyalty of New Spain upon the creation of the latter two decades later. Nevertheless, the audiencia president was at the same time governor and captain general of the Captaincy General of Santo Domingo, which granted him broad administrative powers and autonomy over the Spanish possessions of the Caribbean and most of its mainland coasts. This combined with the judicial oversight that the audiencia judges had over the region meant that the Santo Domingo Audiencia was the principal political entity of this region during the colonial period.

== Structure ==
Law II ("That in the City of Santo Domingo in Hispaniola reside the Royal Audiencia and Chancellory, and of its Ministers, District and Jurisdiction") of Title XV ("Of the Royal Audiencias and Chancellories of the Indies") of Book II of the Recopilación de Leyes de las Indias of 1680—which compiles the decrees of September 14, 1526; June 4, 1527; April 19, 1583; October 30, 1591, and February 17, 1620—describes the limits and functions of the Audiencia.

— We order that in the City of Santo Domingo on the Island of Hispaniola reside our Royal Audiencia and Chancellory, as it has been established, with a president, who shall be governor and captain general; four judges of civil cases [oidores], who shall also serve as judges of criminal cases [alcaldes del crimen]; a crown attorney [fiscal]; a bailiff [alguacil mayor]; and a lieutenant of the Gran Chancellor; and the other necessary ministers and officials, which will have for district all of the Lesser Antilles, and the coast of Tierra Firme, and in them the Governments of Venezuela, New Andalusia, Riohacha, which is of the Government of Santa Marta; and in Guayana or Province of El Dorado, the regions which it now has and no more; dividing territory in the south with the four Audiencias of the New Kingdom of Granada, Tierra Firme [Panama], Guatemala and New Spain, along the coasts which run along the west of North Sea, with the Provinces of Florida, and with the rest in the North Sea; and that the president-governor-captain general can order and will order what is necessary in military matters and relating to the good governance and defense of said Island of Santo Domingo, according to what the rest of our governors-captain generals of the provinces of our Indies can and should do, and fill the governorships and other offices, should they become vacant in the district of this Audiencia, until we can fill them, and do, apply and provide the other matters that relate to government, and that the judges of said Audiencia do not intervene in these matters, nor the president in those relating to justice, and that all sign the sentences and ordinances of the judges.

The Audiencia of Santo Domingo maintained judicial oversight of Caracas Province, except for two short periods from 1717 to 1723 and 1739 to 1742, until the establishment of the Audiencia of Caracas in 1786. It also oversaw the provinces of Maracaibo, Margarita, Cumaná (New Andalusia), Guyana, Barinas and Trinidad, (which had been transferred to the Audiencia of Bogotá in 1739) from 1777 to 1786, while plans for the new Real Audiencia of Caracas were finalized. The president of the Audiencia retained administrative oversight of Margarita, Cumaná and Caracas throughout the majority of the colonial period.

Because Spain ceded Hispaniola to France in the Peace of Basel of 1795, the Audiencia was transferred to Santa María del Puerto Príncipe (today Camagüey, Cuba) by the royal decree of March 17, 1799. The new Audiencia was set up the following year and called the Real Audiencia of Puerto Príncipe. This Audiencia maintained jurisdiction over Cuba, Puerto Rico, Louisiana and Florida. In 1838 the Real Audiencia of Havana was created, with the Puerto Príncipe retaining jurisdiction over the Eastern and Central departments of Cuba, since Spain had lost Florida and Louisiana. In 1831 the Real Audiencia of Puerto Rico was established, but it was dissolved in 1853.

== See also ==
- Colony of Santo Domingo − Captaincy General of Santo Domingo
- Museo de las Casas Reales
- Spanish Empire
