= Governorate of New Andalusia (1501–1513) =

Spanish colonial entity

Governorate of New Andalusia (and Coquivacoa) Tierra Firme
- 1501–1513
- Flag Coat of arms

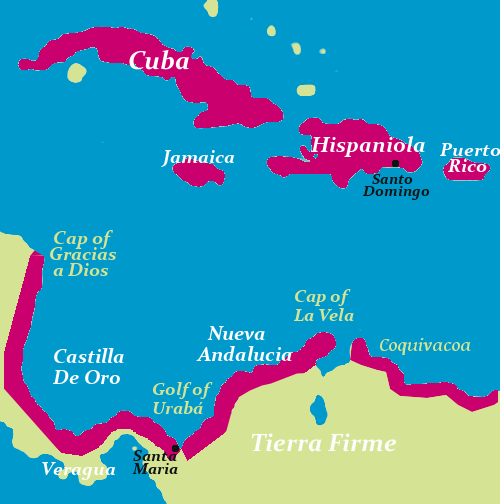
- Tierra Firme: Castilla de Oro and New Andalucia (with Coquivacoa)
- Status: Governorate of Castile (Spanish Empire)
- Capital: Santa Cruz
- Common languages: Spanish
- Religion: Roman Catholicism
- Government: Monarchy
- List of Castilian monarchs
- Historical era: Spanish Empire
  - Established: 1501
  - Creation the Great Governorate of Castilla de Oro.: 1513
| Preceded by | Succeeded by |
| Province of Tierra Firme | Castilla de Oro |

The Governorate of New Andalusia (Spanish: Gobernación de Nueva Andalucía, pronounced [ɡoβeɾnaˈθjon de ˈnweβa andaluˈθi.a]) was a Spanish colonial entity in what today constitutes the Caribbean coastal territories from Central America, Colombia and Venezuela, and the islands of what today are Jamaica, Cuba, Haiti, Dominican Republic and Puerto Rico. The Government of Nueva Andalucia was set in Venezuela from 1501 to 1513.

== History ==
In 1501, Alonso de Ojeda colonized the mainland of present-day Venezuela, and received the Governorate of New Andalusia (Coquivacoa), between Cabo de la Vela and Isla Margarita (island). This was territory originally seen by Christopher Columbus.

On May 3, 1502 Ojeda founded the town of Santa Cruz in the Guajira Peninsula, the first Spanish colony in the future Province of Tierra Firme. The settlements were later abandoned for new explorations.

In 1509, authority was granted to Alonso de Ojeda to colonize the territories between Cabo de la Vela and the Gulf of Urabá as part of the Governorate of New Andalusia.

The Governorate of New Andalusia territories were further unified in May 1513 with the Governorate of Castilla de Oro.

== See also ==
- Colonial Venezuela
- Governorate of New Andalusia (1534-1549) — in colonial Uruguay, Paraguay, Chile, Argentina, and Brazil.
- New Andalusia Province, or Province of Cumaná (1537–1864) — within the colonial Royal Audience of Santo Domingo (1526-1823), Captaincy General of Venezuela (1777–1823), and later of Gran Colombia (1819–1831), and early independent Venezuela (founded 1811).
