= Libertadores =

Principal leaders of the Spanish American wars of Independence and Brazilian Independence

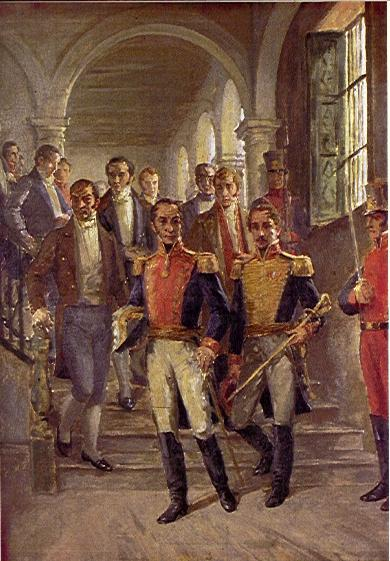
- Simón Bolívar and Francisco de Paula Santander
- Native name: Libertadores
- Date: Late 18th–19th centuries
- Location: Spanish America and Brazil
- Type: Independence movements
- Cause: Spanish American wars of independence, Napoleonic Wars and Independence of Brazil
- Outcome: Independence of multiple countries in the Americas

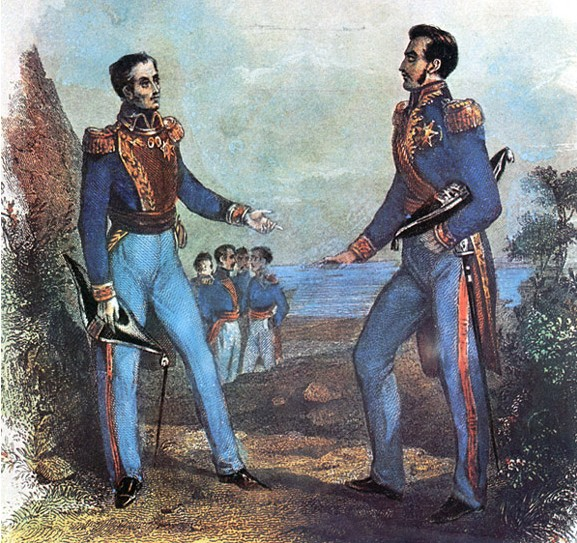
The Guayaquil conference (1822) between Simón Bolívar and José de San Martín, the greatest libertadores (liberators) of Spanish America.

The Libertadores (Spanish pronunciation: [liβeɾtaˈðoɾes], meaning "Liberators") also known as Libertadores de América (meaning "Liberators of the Americas") is the term used to describe military and political leaders associated with the Spanish American wars of Independence and Brazilian Independence, particularly the movements that brought an end to Spanish and Portuguese rule across much of the Americas during the early nineteenth century. They are named that way in contrast with the Conquistadores ("Conquerors").

The liberators came from diverse regional, social, and professional backgrouds. Many promiment leaders belonged to the American-born population of European ancestry, commonly known as (criollos), in most cases part of the aristocracy and bourgeoisie including landowners, military officers, lawyers, merchants, and members of established political families of the viceroyalties of Spain.However, the independence movements also involved indigenous peoples, people of african descent, individuals of mixed ancestry, and women, whose contributions included military service, political organization, intelligence gatherings, and logisitcal support.

These movements emerged from a combination of political, economic, and ideological movements in America and Europe, including the Age of Enlightenment, Peninsular War and the Napoleonic Wars.

These leaders and liberators pursued many different political objectives, from constitutional monarchy and regional autonomy to republican independence, and frequently disagreed over the political organization of the territories they sought to govern all across the Americas.

== Legacy ==
The flags of Venezuela, Colombia and Ecuador follow Francisco de Miranda's design of 1806. Also, Bolivia was named after Símon Bolívar, who in turn was president of Colombia, Peru, Bolivia and twice of Venezuela. San Martín served as "President Protector" of Peru.

In what today is part of Mexico, Guatemala, El Salvador, Honduras, Nicaragua and Costa Rica, Agustín de Iturbide, royalist leader formed an alliance with rebel forces of Vicente Guerrero, and under the Plan of Iguala stablished an independent Mexican Empire where he ascended as Emperor Agustín I.

The names of libertadores are used all over Latin America to name anything from towns and places to institutions and sports clubs. Also, the most prestigious international club football competition in South America is named the Copa Libertadores in their honour.

== List of libertadores ==
=== Hispanic America ===
Portrait	Name (Birth–Death)	Contributed to the independence of	Took part in	Refs
	Simón Bolívar (1783–1830)	Colombia, Venezuela, Ecuador, Peru, Panama and Bolivia	Colombian War of Independence Venezuelan War of Independence; Ecuadorian War of Independence; Peruvian War of Independence; Bolivian War of Independence	
	José de San Martín (1778–1850)	Argentina, Chile and Peru	Argentine War of Independence; Crossing of the Andes; Chilean War of Independence; Peruvian War of Independence	
	Francisco de Paula Santander (1792–1840)	Colombia, Venezuela, Ecuador, Peru, Panama and Bolivia	Colombian War of Independence Venezuelan War of Independence; Ecuadorian War of Independence; Peruvian War of Independence Bolivian War of Independence	
	Antonio José de Sucre (1795–1830)	Colombia, Venezuela, Ecuador and Bolivia.	Venezuelan War of Independence; Ecuadorian War of Independence; Bolivian War of Independence; Peruvian War of Independence; Gran Colombia–Peru War	
	Antonio Nariño (1765-1823)	Colombia, Venezuela and Ecuador.	Colombian War of Independence Venezuelan War of Independence; Ecuadorian War of Independence	
	José María Córdova (1799 -1829)	Colombia, Venezuela, Ecuador and Bolivia.	Colombian War of Independence Venezuelan War of Independence; Ecuadorian War of Independence; Peruvian War of Independence Bolivian War of Independence	
	José Prudencio Padilla	Colombia and Venezuela	Colombian War of Independence Venezuelan War of Independence	
	Francisco de Miranda (1750–1816)	Venezuela and United States	American Revolutionary War; French Revolution; Venezuelan War of Independence	
	Bernardo O'Higgins (1778–1842)	Chile and Peru	Chilean War of Independence; Argentine War of Independence; Peruvian War of Independence	
	Francisco Burdett O'Connor (1791–1871)	Bolivia, Peru, Venezuela, Colombia	Spanish American wars of independence War of the Confederation	
	Andrés de Santa Cruz (1792–1865)		Bolivian War of Independence; Argentine War of Independence; Peruvian War of Independence; Ecuadorian War of Independence; War of the Confederation	
	Augustin I of Mexico (1783–1824)	Mexico, Guatemala, El Salvador, Honduras, Nicaragua and Costa Rica	Mexican War of Independence design of the Plan de Iguala	
	Vicente Guerrero (1782–1831)	Mexico, Guatemala, El Salvador, Honduras, Nicaragua and Costa Rica	Mexican War of Independence signatory of the Plan de Iguala	
	Manuel Belgrano (1770–1820)	Argentina, Bolivia and Paraguay	British invasions of the River Plate; May Revolution; Paraguay campaign Argentine War of Independence; Bolivian War of Independence	
	José María Vergara Lozano (1792–1857)	Spain, Colombia, Venezuela	Peninsular War (Spanish War of Independence) Colombian War of Independence Venezuelan War of Independence	
	José Gervasio Artigas (1764–1850)		British invasions of the River Plate; Portuguese invasion of the Banda Oriental; Portuguese conquest of the Banda Oriental; Argentine Civil Wars	
	Thomas Cochrane (1775–1860)		French Revolutionary Wars; Napoleonic Wars; Chilean War of Independence; Peruvian War of Independence; Brazilian War of Independence; Greek War of Independence	
	Pedro Santana (1801–1864)	Dominican Republic	Dominican War of Independence	
	Miguel Hidalgo y Costilla (1753–1811)	Mexico	Grito de Dolores; Mexican War of Independence	
	José María Morelos (1765–1815)	Mexico	Mexican War of Independence wrote the Sentimientos de la Nación	
	Ramón Castilla (1797–1867)	Peru	Peruvian War of Independence	
	Juan Antonio Lavalleja (1784–1853)	Uruguay	Cisplatine War; Thirty-Three Orientals	
	Mariano Moreno (1778–1811)	Argentina	May Revolution; Argentine War of Independence; Paraguay campaign	

=== Brazil ===
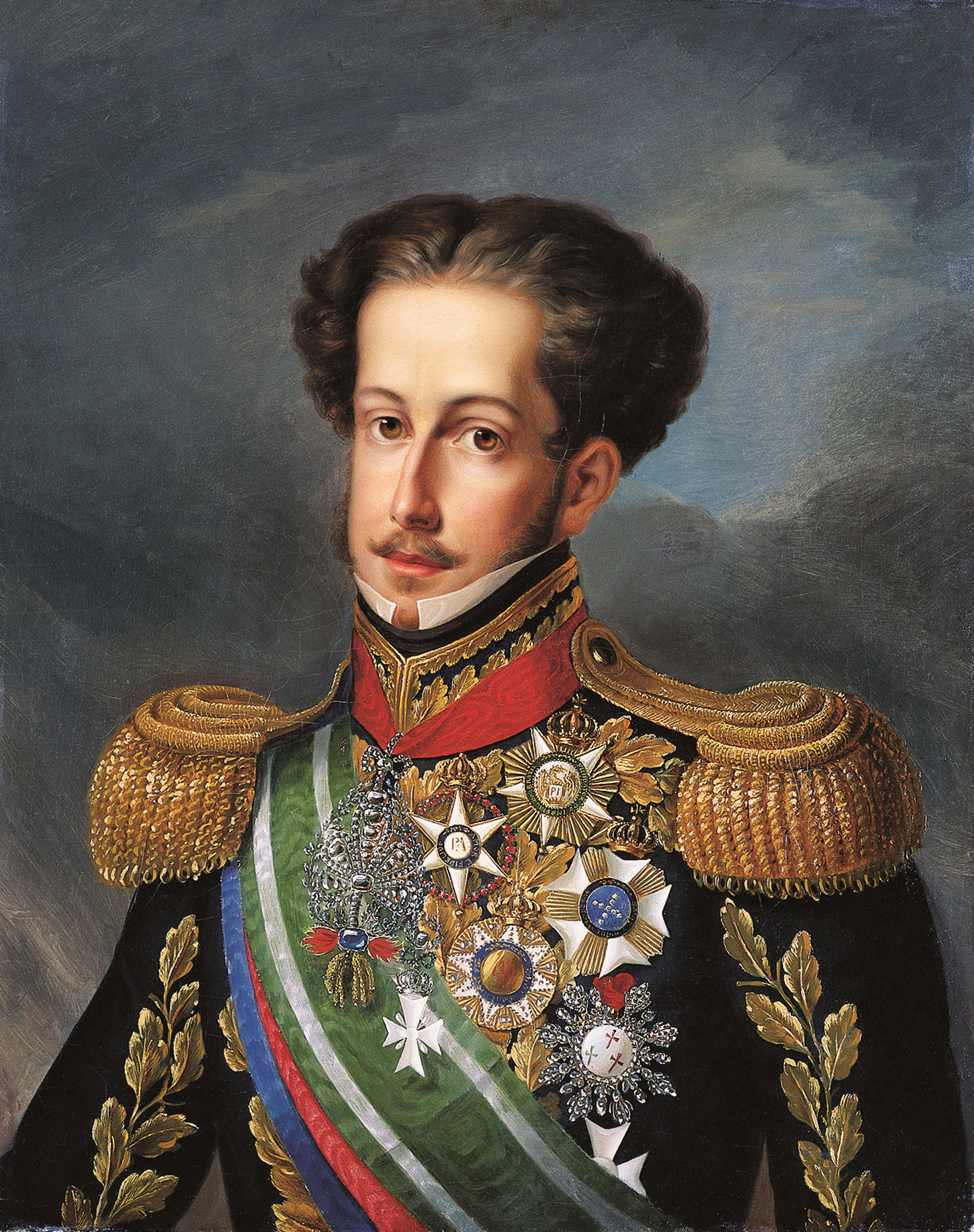
Pedro I became known as the libertador (liberator) of Brazil.

Pedro I of Brazil became known as "o Libertador" ("the Liberator") in Brazil for his role in the country's independence. Sporadically, the term has also been applied to other figures such as José Bonifacio (known as the "patriarch for independence"), Maria Leopoldina de Austria, and Joaquim Gonçalves Ledo.

=== Philippines ===
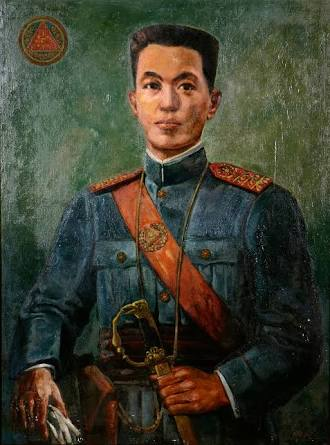
Emilio Aguinaldo

Emilio Aguinaldo, the first Filipino President and Generalissimo who liberated the Philippines from the Spanish Empire in 1898, is widely recognized as "El Libertador de la Patria" (The Liberator of the Homeland)

== See also ==
- List of national founders
- Father of the Nation
- Founding Fathers of the United States
- Statues of the Liberators

== Bibliography ==
- Robert Harvey. Liberators: Latin America's Struggle for Independence. Woodstock, The Overlook Press, 2000. ISBN 1-58567-072-3
- James Higgins (editor). The Emancipation of Peru: British Eyewitness Accounts, 2014. Online at https://sites.google.com/site/jhemanperu
- Marion Lansing. Liberators and Heroes of South America. Boston, L. C. Page & Co., 1940.
- Irene Nicholson. The Liberators: A Study of Independence Movements in Spanish America. New York, Frederick A. Praeger, 1968.
- Pigna, Felipe (2010). Libertadores de América. Buenos Aires: Planeta. ISBN 978-950-49-2420-3.
