= Bartolomé Salom =

Venezuelan general

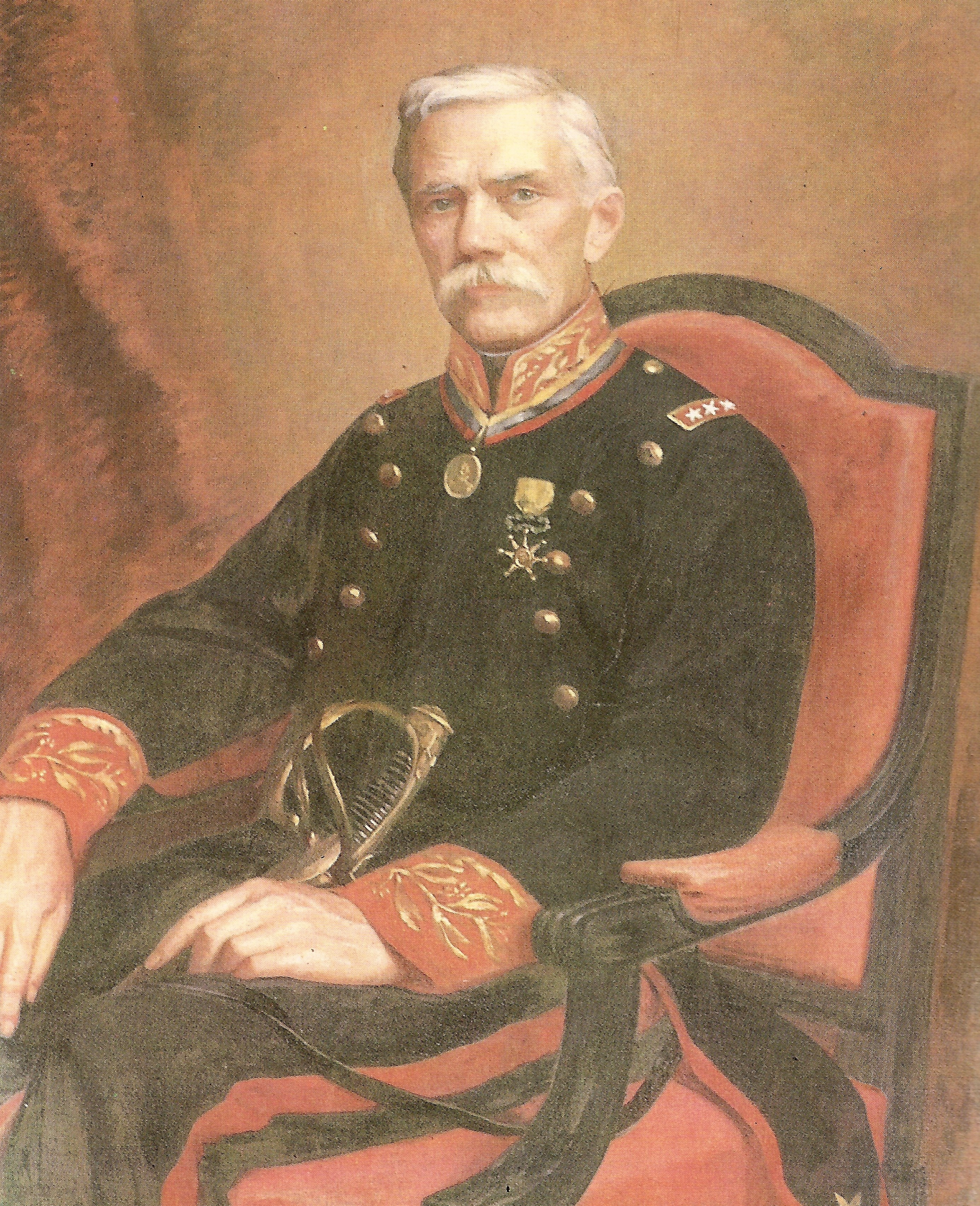
- Born: Bartolomé Antonio de la Concepción Salom Borges; August 24, 1780; Puerto Cabello, Venezuela, Spain
- Died: October 30, 1863 (aged 83); Puerto Cabello, State of Venezuela
- Military career
- Allegiance: Venezuela
- Service years: c. 1810–1863
- Rank: General
- Conflicts: Spanish American wars of independence: Venezuelan War of Independence; Valencia Campaign; Monteverde Campaign; Battle of La Victoria; Los Cayos Expedition; Naval Battle of Los Frailes; Battle of Carúpano; Second Battle of Angostura; New Granada Campaign; Battle of Carabobo; Colombian War of Independence; Admirable Campaign; Siege of Cartagena (1815); Southern Campaigns; Pasto Campaign; Battle of Bomboná; Peruvian War of Independence; Second siege of Callao

Bartolomé Antonio de la Concepción Salom Borges (August 24, 1780, in Puerto Cabello – October 30, 1863, in Puerto Cabello) was a Venezuelan-born general and patriotic leader in the Venezuelan War of Independence. He is considered a national hero in Venezuela and Peru.
