= Juan Nepomuceno Moreno =

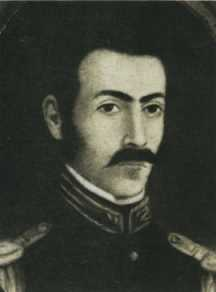

President of the United Provinces of New Granada
- In office December 18, 1818 – September 10, 1819
- Preceded by: Fernando Serrano
- Succeeded by: Simón Bolívar

Juan Nepomuceno Moreno (Paz de Ariporo, late 18th century - 31 December 1839) was a military commander and politician from Colombia. He was the interim president of New Granada between the 18th of December 1818 until the proclamation of a decree on the 10th of September 1819.

== Life ==
He was born during the late 18th century in a place know as La Fragua, modern-day Paz de Ariporo, Casanare, Colombia. He fought in the War of Independence of New Granada on the independentist side.

=== Retreat to the Eastern Llanos ===
In 1814 he fought against the royalists in Arauca and participated in the 1815 Battle of Guasdualito. In 1816 he became the governor of the province of Casanare after a self-proclamation. That same year, he welcomed in Casanare the patriot generals Manuel Serviez and Francisco de Paula Santander, as well as the surviving troops of the patriot army. On July 16, 1816, he accepted a resolution by the local junta of Arauca that named General Santander as the Commander in Chief of the Army. On October of the same year, he fought under the command of General José Antonio Páez at the battles of El Yagual and Achaguas.

=== Campaign lo liberate New Granada ===
In 1818, he was designated as the official governor of Casanare by General Paéz. On December 18, 1818, the Proclamation of Pore delegated interim presidential powers on him. He was given the title of Commander General of the Cavalry on June 15, 1819. He fought in the Battle of Boyacá on June 11, 1819, as Commander General of the Cavalry. He retired to Casanare afterwards.

=== Military campaign in Gran Colombia ===
On February, 1821, he renounced to his position as Commander of the Cavalry and decided to join General José Antonio Paéz, participating at the Battle of Carabobo. He also fought at the Siege of Puerto Cabello in November, 1823.

=== Republican period ===
In 1832 he became one of the generals that were part of the higher command of the military of the Republic of New Granada.

In April 1831, he marched from Pore with 300 cavalry soldiers and 400 infantry soldier, in order to force the exist of Venezuelan General Rafael Urdaneta from New Granada.

By doing so, and by respecting the Apulo Agreements, he guaranteed the return of previously exiled General Santander into New Granada.

== Retirement and death ==
He died on 31 December 1839 in his hacienda, close to the town of La Fragua.

== Tributes ==
The Order of Merit "Juan Nepomuceno Moreno", named after him.
