= Inés María Jiménez =

Inés María Jiménez was an Ecuadorian revolutionary heroine who participated in several battles in the Ecuadorian War of Independence.

== Biography ==
Jiménez was a woman from Loja who, along with Gertrudis Esparza and Rosa Robalino, signed up to fight in the troops of the Ecuadorian independence army. They assumed a masculine identity to fight because, in 1817 and 1819 respectively, Generals Pablo Morillo and Francisco Santander prohibited women from marching with the troops. As a result, Jiménez, Esparza and Robalino adopted the assumed names Manuel Jiménez, Manuel Esparza and Manuel Jurado respectively.

Jiménez fought in the Babahoyo campaign on 21 August 1821, and in the Battle of Pichincha on 24 May 1822. Later, she fought in the Battles of Junín and Ayacucho.

== Legacy ==
Jiménez was decorated after fighting in the Battle of Ayacucho. Simón Bolívar publicly acknowledged and thanked the participation of women in the fighting. A street in Quito was named in her honor.
