= El Peñol =

El Peñol may refer to:

- El Peñol, Antioquia, a town and municipality in Antioquia Department, Colombia
- El Peñol, Nariño, a town and municipality in Nariño Department, Colombia
