= Pasto Campaign =

Part of the Ecuadorian War of Independence

Second Battle of Huachi
- Part of the Colombian War of Independence and Ecuadorian War of Independence
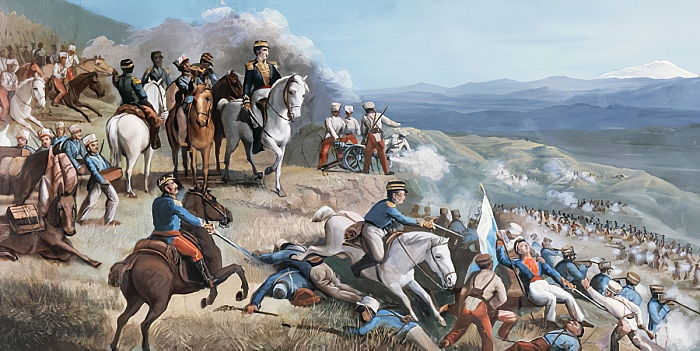
- Battle of Ibarra 1823
Date	1822–1824
Location	Southern Colombia; Northern Ecuador
Result	Gran Colombia victory

Belligerents
Gran Colombia	Kingdom of Spain

Commanders and leaders
Simón Bolívar; Antonio José de Sucre; Bartolomé Salom; Pedro León Torres †; Pedro Alcántara Herrán; José María Córdova; José Mires; Juan José Flores; T. Cipriano de Mosquera; José María Obando (1823)	Basilio Modesto García (surrendered); Benito Remigio Boves; Agustín Agualongo (executed); E. Merchán Cano (executed); José María Obando (1822)

Strength
7,500 (June 1822)	2,000 (Note: Encina 1954, p. 264)

Casualties and losses
3,500 (June 1822)	Unknown
- Many civilians

The Pasto Campaign was a series of military operations carried out between 1822 and 1824 by Gran Colombia against the Royalist strongholds of San Juan de Pasto and Patía, Cauca in present-day Southern Colombia.

The Pasto campaign was part of a larger military campaign called the Southern Campaigns, which would lead Simón Bolívar and Antonio José de Sucre to also liberate the Real Audiencia of Quito (present-day Ecuador), Peru and Bolivia, leading to the total defeat of Spanish Royalist forces on the South American continent in 1826.

== Context ==
The people of Pasto and Patía had traditionally few relations with Bogotá, and were rather under the influence of Popayán and Quito. They had a conservative political-religious vision of the world and good relations with the Spanish settled there.

Since 1809, they had been at war against the revolutionaries of Quito, and from 1811 against the Neogranadine rebels. A year later, they were decisive in putting down the Quito Rebellion., helped defeat Nariño's Southern Campaign in 1814, and in 1816 played an important role during the Spanish reconquest of New Granada. After the Spanish defeat in the Battle of Boyacá in 1819, Pasto became the only remaining stronghold capable of stopping the southern expansion of the Revolution.

In August 1821, after the victory in the Battle of Carabobo and considering that the Venezuelan Royalists were defeated, Simón Bolívar began to focus his attention on the capture of the territories of the Real audiencia de Quito and the final defeat of the Royalists of the Viceroyalty of Peru.

His initial plan was to send 4,000 soldiers and 3,000 rifles by sea from the port of Buenaventura to Guayaquil, (Note: Pérez Ochoa 1982, p. 306) to join the troops of Antonio José de Sucre, who since May were helping the Free Province of Guayaquil against the Royalist garrison of Quito. However this plan was thwarted by a Royalist flotilla which blocked Buenaventura.

Running out of options, Bolívar was forced to advance overland to Quito via Pasto, a fiercely Royalist region. (Note: Gutiérrez Ramos 2012, p. 220) (Note: Gutiérrez Ramos 2012, p. 195) On 13 December, the Libertador and his army left Bogota and headed south.

== Bolivar's Campaign ==
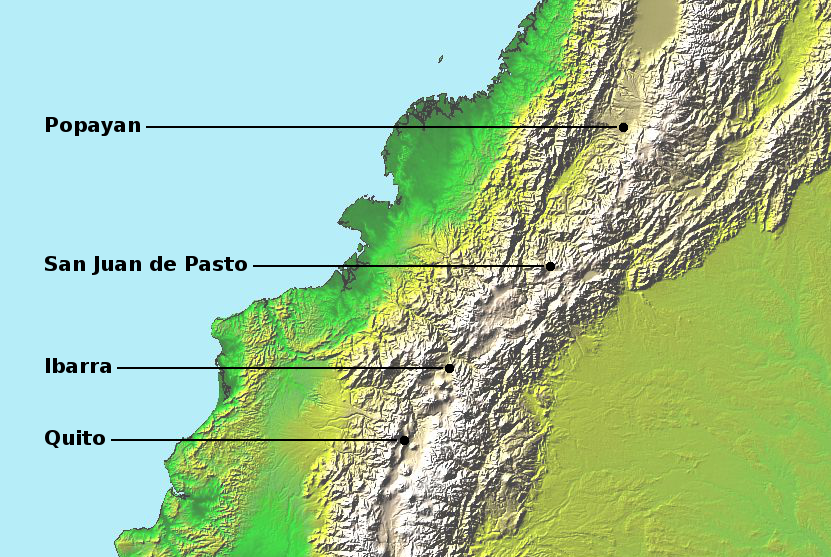
map of the region

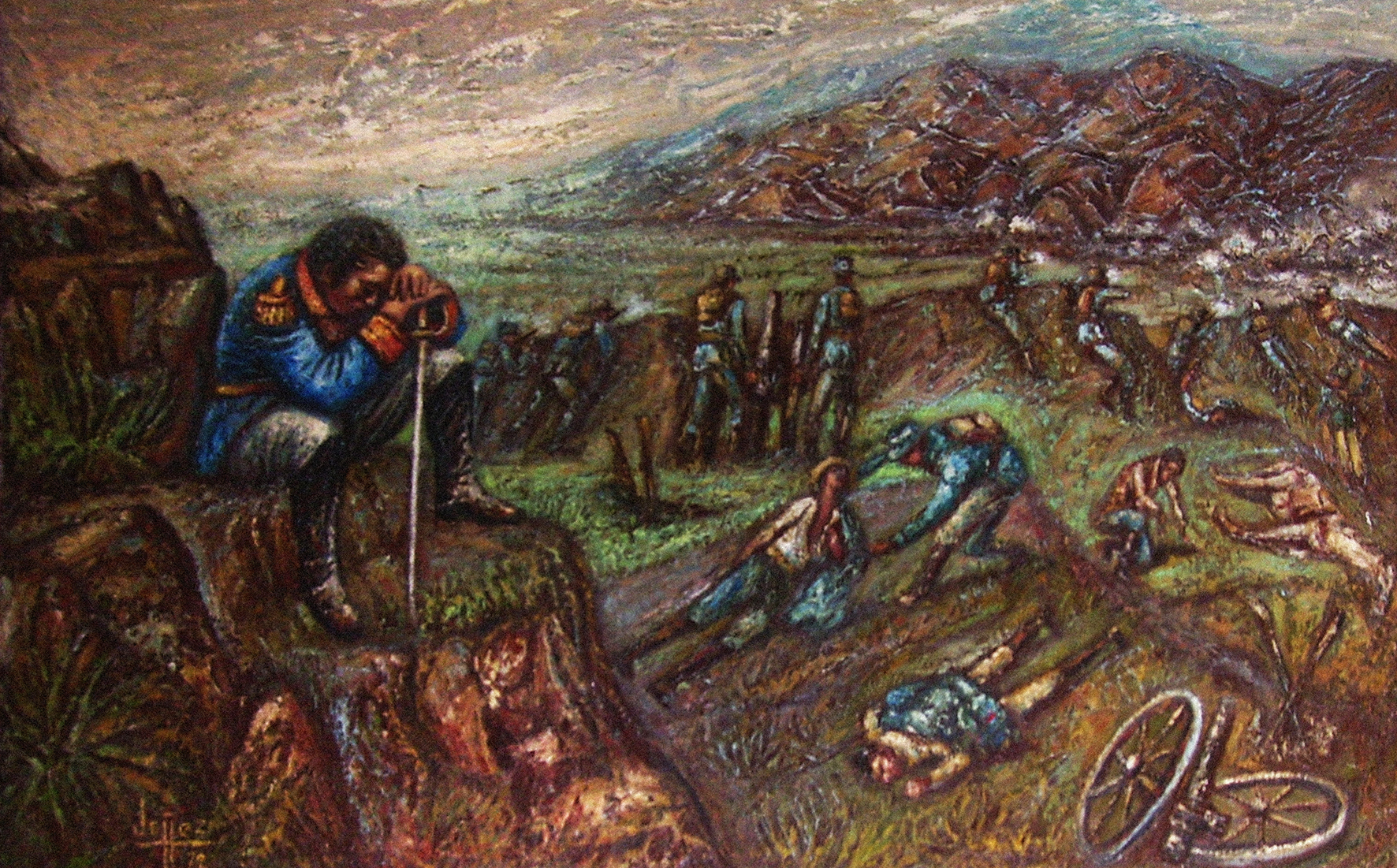
Bolivar after the Battle of Bomboná

On 31 January 1822, Bolívar arrived in Popayán, where he was joined by the division of General Pedro León Torres. On 23 February, the Patriot army crossed the Mayo River, but instead of following the dangerous route leading to Pasto, they decided to follow the course of the Juanambú River. On 2 April, they arrived at Cerro Gordo with reduced forces. His army had by then already lost 1,000 veterans and another 1,000 locals recruited by force, from actions by enemy guerrillas, the need to leave garrisons along the way and as a result of illness and desertions. Two days later, Bolívar decided to change course and head towards San Juan de Pasto.

On 7 April, Spanish Governor Basilio Modesto García ambushed the Patriots at Bomboná. Both sides suffered heavy losses in the Battle of Bomboná and Bolívar had to retreat to Cariaco, 20 km west of Pasto and nine days later he was back north of the Rio Mayo. On 20 April the Royalists were defeated at El Peñol, after which García retreated to Pasto and Bolívar, with reinforcements, crossed the river Mayo again with 2,500 men.

Shortly after, on 24 May, Antonio José de Sucre won his great victory at the Battle of Pichincha in Ecuador. Understanding that with the fall of Quito all resistance had becomes useless, García and the Creole elite of Pasto, led by the military leader José María Obando, decided to capitulate in exchange for the preservation of their properties and their positions, an amnesty and the continuation of the existing social situation. However, the indigenous popular mass refused to accept capitulation.

On 8 June 1822, Bolívar triumphantly entered Pasto. The land route between Bogotá and Quito had been opened, and it was now time for the Libertador to concentrate on Peru. (Note: Pérez Ochoa 1982, p. 335)

== First rebellion ==
In September a rebellion broke out led by Colonel Benito Remigio Boves, nephew of José Tomás Boves. On 22 October, Boves regained full control of Pasto. Faced with this uprising, Bolívar sent Sucre to put an end to it. On 24 November, Boves was victorious in the first battle of Cuchilla de Taindala but on 22 December 1822 he was defeated in the second battle at the same place. Finally, between 23 and 25 December, Sucre entered Pasto with his Rifles battalion.

In a little-known episode in Colombian historiography, later known as Navidad Negra (Black Christmas), a massacre was committed against the civilian population of the city. More than 400 civilians, mostly non-combatant men, elderly people, women and children, were murdered and the city was left to pillage, rape and destruction by Patriotic troops. Also ordered was the execution of 14 prominent inhabitants of Pasto, which were tied in pairs and drowned in the Guáitara River. 1,000 Pastusos were recruited by force and 300 exiled to Quito and Guayaquil, from where few returned. All Royalist prisoners were shot, officers included, and a large quantity of property was confiscated.

Initially General Bartolomé Salom was left in charge of the city, but he was sent back to Quito on Bolívar's orders. A garrison was maintained to occupy the city under the command of Colonel Juan José Flores.

== Second rebellion ==
In 1823, a new uprising broke out in Pasto under the civilian command of Lieutenant Colonel Estanislao Merchán Cano and the military command of Colonel Agustín Agualongo. With 1,000 men, they attacked Pasto on 10 June, and of the 600 men in the Patriot garrison, 150 were killed, 50 wounded and 300 taken prisoners. Colonel Juan José Flores fled to Juanambú, Merchán Cano became the last Royalist governor of the city and Agualongo was named general commander.

The rebels quickly gathered 2,000 combatants, but barely 800 of them had a rifle. (Note: Restrepo Vélez 1858, p. 355) They decided to take Ibarra and if possible Quito, knowing that the bulk of the Patriot army was engaged in Peru. (Note: Restrepo Vélez 1858, pp. 355–356) Bolívar left Guayaquil for Quito, where 400 veterans and 1,600 recruits were gathered. Agualongo advances triumphantly towards Ibarra with 1,500 infantrymen and 100 horsemen. Bolívar took command of a division of 1,800 soldiers and was victorious in the Second Battle of Ibarra on 17 June, thanks to the superiority of his cavalry. 800 rebels were killed.

Agualongo remained active in the south of Pasto and on 19 August, he besieged San Juan de Pasto. A month later, on 20 September, the Royalists took the town and Flores had to flee to Yacuanquer. However, on 14 December, the Republicans recovered San Juan under the command of Irish Brigadier General José Mires.

On 1 June 1824, Agualongo tried to take Barbacoas, but was completely defeated by Colonel Tomás Cipriano de Mosquera.
On 24 June, Agualongo arrived at the town of El Castigo, where he had agreed to meet with José María Obando.
But he was betrayed and arrested along with the bulk of his men. On 8 July, he was taken to Popayán, where he was executed on the 13th.
Merchán Cano was murdered when he was in the custody of Colonel Flores.
