= Colombian War of Independence =

1810-1825 Colombian revolution

- Part of the Atlantic Revolutions, Spanish American wars of independence, Decolonization of the Americas
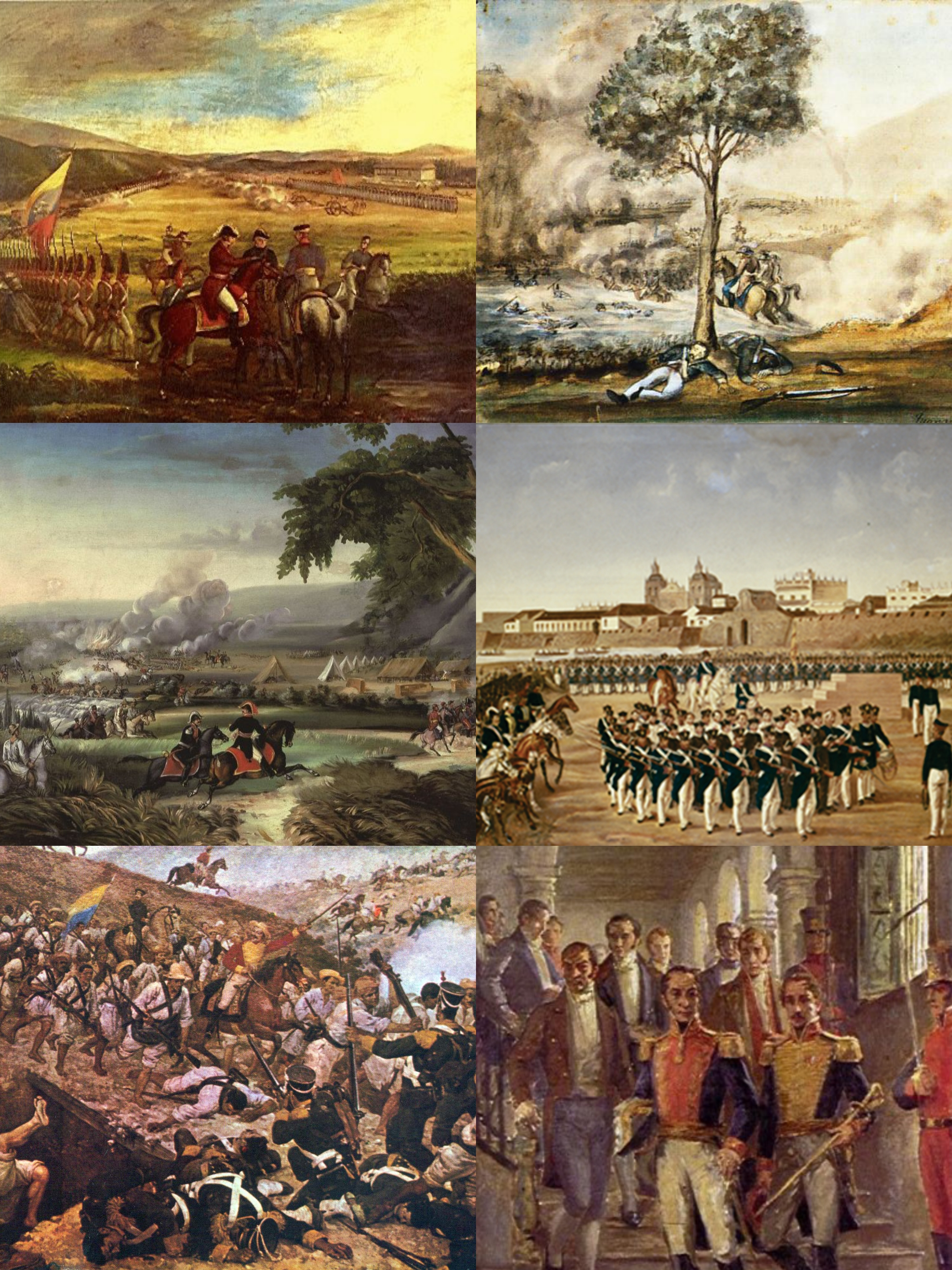
- From left to right and top to bottom: Battle of Calibío, Battle of Juanambú, Battle of the Palo River, Siege of Cartagena (1815), Battle of Boyacá and Congress of Cúcuta.
Date	July 20, 1810 – April 2, 1825
Location	Northern South America, Andean South America, the Caribbean, Central America, Florida
Result	Colombian and allied victory: Military outcomes; Defeat of the principal Spanish royalist armies in New Granada, Venezuela and the Quito region.; Liberation of New Granada following the Liberation Campaign of New Granada and the Battle of Boyacá (1819).; Decisive republican victories at the Battle of Carabobo (1821), Battle of Pichincha (1822) and Battle of Lake Maracaibo (1823).; Capture of the remaining major royalist strongholds and suppression of the Pasto royalist resistance (1822–1824).; Political and territorial outcomes; Proclamation of the Republic of Colombia by the Congress of Angostura (1819).; Ratification of the union of New Granada and Venezuela, and adoption of the Constitution of Cúcuta by the Congress of Cúcuta (1821).; Independence of Panama from Spain and its incorporation into the Republic of Colombia (1821).; Incorporation of Quito and Guayaquil into the Republic of Colombia (1822).; End of Spanish royalist government over most of the territories incorporated into the Republic of Colombia.; Wider South American consequences; Participation of Colombian forces in the Peruvian War of Independence, including the Battle of Junín and Battle of Ayacucho (1824).; Contribution to the consolidation of Peruvian independence and the subsequent establishment of Bolivia (1825).; Failure to establish the Federation of the Andes of Simón Bolívar's ambitious political project: a proposed union of Gran Colombia (present-day Colombia, Panama, Venezuela and Ecuador), Peru and Bolivia that would have created a vast South American state
Territorial changes	Dissolution of the Viceroyalty of New Granada and reorganization of its territories into independent Gran Colombia, encompassing present-day Colombia.

Belligerents
Early republican governments (1810–1811); Supreme Junta of Santafé; Supreme Junta of Cartagena; Confederated Cities of the Cauca Valley; First New Granadan republics (1811–1816); United Provinces of New Granada; Free and Independent State of Cundinamarca (1811–1814); Free State of Cartagena (1811–1815); Free State of Antioquia; Republic of Tunja; Free State of Socorro; Free State of Neiva; Republican resistance (1816–1819); New Granadan republican forces in Casanare and the Eastern Plains; Venezuelan republican forces in Guayana and the Orinoco region; Venezuelan republican governments (1811–1819); First Republic of Venezuela (1811–1812); Second Republic of Venezuela (1813–1814); Third Republic of Venezuela (1817–1819); Republic of Colombia (1819–1825); Republic of Colombia (established 1819); Republic of Colombia (1821–1825)	Kingdom of Spain and the Indies (the Spains); Principal royalist administrations; Viceroyalty of New Granada; Captaincy General of Venezuela; Royal Audience of Quito; Regional royalist strongholds; Royalist Province of Santa Marta; Royalist garrison of Cartagena (1815–1821); Royalist authorities in Panama (until 1821); Royalist forces of Pasto and Popayán; Royalist forces of Maracaibo and Puerto Cabello; Military and logistical support from other Spanish territories: Viceroyalty of Peru; Captaincy General of Puerto Rico; Captaincy General of Cuba

Commanders and leaders
Early republican leadership (1810–1813); Antonio Nariño (POW); Camilo Torres (executed); Jorge Tadeo Lozano (executed); José Miguel Pey; Manuel Rodríguez Torices (executed); Antonio Baraya (executed); Joaquín Camacho (executed); José María del Castillo y Rada; Republican campaigns and reconquest (1813–1816); Simón Bolívar; Manuel de Bernardo Álvarez (executed); José María Cabal (executed); Custodio García Rovira (executed); Liborio Mejía (executed); José Fernández Madrid; Antonio Villavicencio (executed); Manuel del Castillo y Rada (executed); Manuel Roergas Serviez; Francisco José de Caldas (executed); José Ramón de Leyva (executed); Atanasio Girardot †; Antonio Ricaurte †; José de Ayala y Vergara (executed); Luciano D'Elhuyar; Manuel París Ricaurte; Antonio París Ricaurte; José María Ricaurte; Joaquín Ricaurte; José María Ortega Nariño; Francisco de Paula Vélez; Tadeo Vergara Sanz de Santamaría; Luis de Ayala y Vergara; Tomás Gutiérrez; Luis Lamprea; Republican resistance (1816–1818); Francisco de Paula Santander; Juan Nepomuceno Moreno; Hermógenes Maza; Rafael Urdaneta; José Antonio Páez; Santiago Mariño; Luis Brión; Liberation and republican union (1819–1821); Simón Bolívar; Francisco de Paula Santander; José Antonio Anzoátegui; Francisco Antonio Zea; José María Vergara y Lozano; Carlos Soublette; José María Córdova; Tomás Cipriano de Mosquera; Joaquín París Ricaurte; Final campaigns and consolidation (1821–1825); Antonio José de Sucre; José Prudencio Padilla; José María Córdova; Rafael Urdaneta; Hermógenes Maza	Ferdinand VII; Early royalist leadership (1810–1813); Antonio José Amar y Borbón; Benito Pérez Brito; Miguel Tacón y Rosique; Toribio Montes; Juan de Sámano; Domingo de Monteverde; Eusebio Antoñanzas; José Ceballos; Royalist campaigns and reconquest (1813–1816); Pablo Morillo; Juan de Sámano; Francisco Montalvo y Ambulodi; José Tomás Boves †; Francisco Tomás Morales; Francisco Warleta; Sebastián de la Calzada; Melchor de Aymerich; Ignacio Asín †; Royalist occupation and resistance (1816–1818); Juan de Sámano; Pablo Morillo; Sebastián de la Calzada; Francisco Warleta; Francisco Tomás Morales; Royalist defense and retreat (1819–1821); José María Barreiro (executed); Juan de Sámano; Pablo Morillo; Sebastián de la Calzada; Melchor de Aymerich; Francisco Tomás Morales; Gabriel de Torres; Francisco González; Final royalist resistance (1821–1825); Melchor de Aymerich; Agustín Agualongo (executed); Basilio Modesto García; Benito Remigio Boves; Estanislao Merchancano; Francisco Tomás Morales; Gabriel de Torres; Ángel Laborde

Casualties and losses
400,000 deaths (15% of the population of the Viceroyalty of New Granada and Venezuela in 1810) (Note: Of the 400,000 deaths, 200,000 in Venezuela, 150,000 in Colombia, and 50,000 in Ecuador. The population of the territory of Gran Colombia decreased from 2,900,000 in 1810 to 2,500,000 in 1820.)	

The Colombian War of Independence is traditionally held as having begun on July 20, 1810 when a government junta, a political governing board mostly headed by local colonists, was created in Santa Fe de Bogotá, the capital of the Spanish colonial Viceroyalty of New Granada. This junta overthrew the reigning viceroy of New Granada and established an autonomous government that claimed sovereignty over all of the Viceroyalty of New Granada.

However, various other provinces of New Granada, such as Cartagena and Socorro, had formed their own autonomous governments weeks before the main junta of Santa Fe de Bogotá, with Quito forming the first junta on August 10, 1809. These events inspired similar autonomist movements across South America, and triggered an almost decade-long rebellion culminating in the founding of the Republic of Colombia, which spanned present-day Colombia, mainland Ecuador, Panama, and Venezuela, along with parts of northern Peru and northwestern Brazil. Colombia was the first Spanish colony in South America to declare independence from Spain in 1810. (Note: At the time, the state was known as Colombia; the term Gran Colombia is used historiographically to distinguish it from the current Republic of Colombia, which is also the official name of the former state.)

Although Gran Colombia would ultimately dissolve in 1831, it was for a time among the most powerful countries in the Western Hemisphere, and played an influential role in shaping the political development of other newly sovereign South American states. The modern nation-state of Colombia recognizes the event as its national independence day. Colombia was the first nation of South America to gain independence from a European power and is the third-oldest independent republic in the Western Hemisphere, after the United States from the American Revolution against the British and Haiti from the Haitian Revolution against the French and white settlers.

== Political background ==
Spain was ruled by a typical enlightened absolutist monarch, promoting culture and Christianity, and allowing some expression of the ideas of the Age of Enlightenment, in the country and its colonies, while at the same time maintaining strong political control. However, the Spanish colonies in the Americas were advised to trade with other countries and their colonies, such as Great Britain and British North America, and the French Empire and New France. Spain was their only source of goods and merchandise, although it was unable to fulfill the trade demands of its colonies. Furthermore, Charles III's support for the independence of the United States generated new taxes, causing unrest in Spain's colonies in the Americas, such as the Revolt of the Comuneros (New Granada) and the Rebellion of Túpac Amaru II. Another major tension was the policy of excluding Criollos, or locally born whites, from public administration.

Charles IV (reigned 1788–1808) was not very interested in exercising political power, leaving such duties to his ministers, especially the disliked Manuel Godoy. Charles IV was more interested in pursuing the arts and science and gave little importance to the American colonies.

The development that precipitated the events of July 20, 1810, was the crisis of the Spanish monarchy caused by the 1808 abdications of Charles IV and Ferdinand VII forced by Napoleon Bonaparte in favor of his brother Joseph Bonaparte. The ascension of King Joseph initially had been cheered by Spanish afrancesados (literally, "Frenchified"), usually elites and important statesmen who believed that collaboration with France would bring modernization and liberty to Spain. An example of Joseph's policies was the abolition of the Spanish Inquisition. However, the general population rejected the new king and opposition, led by the priesthood and patriots, became widespread after the French army's first examples of repression (such as the executions of May 3, 1808, in Madrid) became widely known.

Francisco Goya: The Third of May 1808

Eventually an emergency government in the form of a Supreme Central Junta was formed in Spain. Most of the authorities in the Americas swore allegiance to the new Supreme Central Junta.

=== Memorandum of Offences ===
Camilo Torres

The Supreme Central Junta ordered the election of one representative from each of the main cities of the Spanish American viceroyalties by their cabildos (municipal governments). These included primary cities in the Viceroyalty of New Spain, Viceroyalty of Peru, Viceroyalty of New Granada, and Viceroyalty of the Río de la Plata, and the Captaincy General of Cuba, Captaincy General of Puerto Rico, Captaincy General of Guatemala, Captaincy General of Chile, Captaincy General of Venezuela, and the Spanish East Indies. In addition the cabildos were to draft instructions for the representative to present to the Supreme Central Junta.

The Memorandum of Offenses (or Memorandum of Grievances) was drafted by Camilo Torres Tenor in his capacity as legal advisor to the Santa Fe de Bogotá cabildo. In it he criticized the Spanish Monarchy's policy of excluding Criollos from high posts in the Americas and alleging their rights to govern in their homelands as "the offspring of the conquistadores". Furthermore, he proposed equality between Spanish Americans and Spaniards as the basis for maintaining the unity of the Spanish Monarchy:

"[There are no] other means to consolidate the union between America and Spain [but] the just and competent representation of its people, without any difference among its subjects that they do not have because of their laws, their customs, their origins, and their rights. Equality! The sacred right of equality. Justice is founded upon that principle and upon granting everyone that which is his. […] [T]he true fraternal union between European Spaniards and Americans… can never exist except upon the basis of justice and equality. America and Spain are two integral and constituent parts of the Spanish Monarchy… Anyone who believes otherwise does not love his patria… Therefore, to exclude the Americans from such representation, in addition to being the greatest injustice, would arouse distrust and jealousy, and would forever alienate their desires for such a union…"

Torres defended the right of the Viceroyalty of New Granada to establish a junta given the political circumstances. Although the draft expressed many of common sentiments of Criollos at the time and probably was discussed by prominent members of the capital's society, it was never adopted by the cabildo. It would be published for the first time only in 1832.

=== The First Juntas ===
As the military situation in Spain deteriorated, many Spanish Americans desired to establish their own juntas, despite their formal declarations of loyalty to the Supreme Central Junta back in Europe. A movement to set up a junta in neighboring Caracas in 1808 was stopped by the Captain-General with arrests of the conspirators. In the Royal Audiencia of Charcas (present day Bolivia) juntas were established in Charcas (May 25) and La Paz (July 1809).

More importantly to events in New Granada, in the neighboring Royal Audiencia of Quito—a territory under the auspices of the Viceroy of New Granada— a group of Criollos led by Juan Pío Montúfar, the second Marquis of Selva Alegre, established the autonomous junta Luz de América on August 10, swearing loyalty to Ferdinand VII, but rejecting the viceregal authorities. Viceroy Antonio José Amar y Borbón considered this a rebellious act, and fearing for similar developments in New Granada, ordered military action to put down the junta in conjunction with the Viceroy of Peru.

== Formation of the Independent Junta of Santa Fé de Bogotá ==
In mid-1810 news arrived that the Supreme Central Junta had dissolved itself in favor of a regency. In response to the new political crisis, Spaniards and Criollos in the Americas established juntas that continued to swear allegiance to King Ferdinand VII.

The next incident happened in Caracas, on April 19, 1810. The mantuanos, (the rich, criollo elite of colonial Venezuela) together with military and eclessiatic authorities, declared autonomy, again swearing loyalty to Ferdinand VII, but rejecting the viceroyalty. The Cádiz Board of government decided to order the destitution of Amar y Borbon, sending a notification with the royal visitor Antonio Villavicencio, who arrived in Cartagena on May 8.

On May 22 in Cartagena, the Cartagena Board of government was created with similar terms to the previous one. Shortly after, similar actions against the Viceroy broke out in Santiago de Cali, Socorro and Pamplona. Finally, Bogotá, the central cathedra of the Viceroyalty rebelled on July 20. The spark for this was the so-called "flower vase incident" (Spanish: El Florero de Llorente) involving Spanish businessman José González Llorente on the morning of the 20th. The Colombian patriotic tradition takes this incident as the starting point for the struggle for the Independence of Colombia.

=== Flower vase incident ===
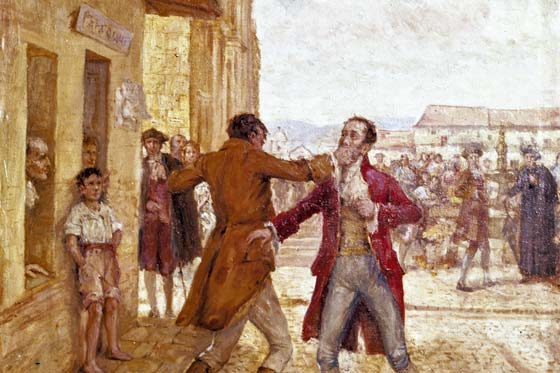
Scuffle between Jose Gonzalez Llorente and Pantaleón Santamaría during the Flower vase incident.

First, on the morning of July 20, 1810, Joaquín Camacho went to the residence of the Viceroy Antonio José Amar y Borbón, requesting response on an application for the establishment of a governing board in Bogotá, the viceregal capital, in similar lines to those already established in other cities. The refusal of the Viceroy to grant the request, coupled with his arrogance, made the group of dissatisfied Criollos decide to execute their plan to provoke a revolt, which would have as trigger the loan of a vase.

Criollos Luis Rubio and Pantaleón Sanz de Santamaría then went to visit Spanish businessman José González Llorente to borrow a vase, to use it at a welcoming dinner for the visiting Royal commissioner Antonio Villavicencio, also a Criollo. As expected (and hoped), Llorente refused to lend the vase with a haughty attitude, because he would not lend any object to Criollos, and certainly not to celebrate another Criollo.

As they had planned the day before, Francisco José de Caldas now used Llorente's refusal, placing heavy emphasis on his disparaging remarks towards Criollos, to inflame the hundreds of people, who had gathered to welcome Villavicencio, against the Spaniards.

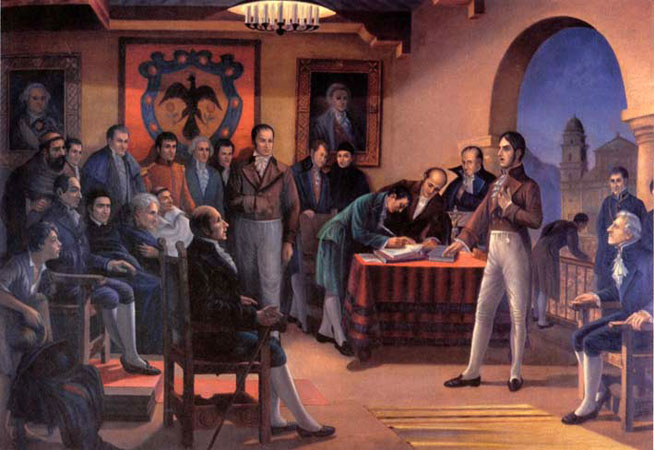
The signing of the Act of Independence

This prompted a turbulent response from the people, who tried to attack Llorente. The mayor of Santa Fe de Bogotá, José Miguel Pey, tried to calm the crowd attacking Llorente, while Jose Maria Carbonell encouraged more people to join in the protest. That afternoon, a Junta was formed (later called the People's Junta) with José Acevedo y Gómez as chairman, and Viceroy Amar y Borbón as president. But the crowds were angered by the decision to nominate the Viceroy as president, and the next day, July 21, the Junta ordered the resignation of Viceroy Amar y Borbón from the Junta presidency and also for his arrest and that of his officials.

Five days later, July 26, the Junta declared that its ties to the Seville Regency Council were finally cut, therefore the Junta officially declared the independence of what is now Colombia from Spanish rule and the rule of the Regency Council. Bogotá would be the first city of the colony to break its ties with Spain, followed by more provincial capitals in the coming months.

Cartagena's Declaration of Independence

One of the most defining moments in the history of Colombian independence occurs in Cartagena in the year 1811. When Bogotá created a junta in 1810, elite creole men in Cartagena created their own the following year after expelling the Spanish Governor Francisco De Montes. On November 11, 1811, the junta comprised the document known as "Act of Independence" to justify the expulsion of the Spanish governor. The declaration, filled with enlightenment ideas such as the right of all men to vote regardless of ethnicity, was the first of its kind in Colombia and is regarded as the event that kickstarted the Latin American Independence Wars. The event is still celebrated in Cartagena as their independence week.

== Foolish Fatherland (1810–1815) ==
Map of New Granada in 1811 with the Federalist territory in red, the Centralist in green and the Royalist (Spanish) in yellow.

The first five years of independence is known as the period of the Foolish Fatherland (la Patria Boba), which was marked by chaos, internal instability and even Civil war on the one hand, and on the other hand by armed conflicts with the area's that had remained loyal to Spain.

Each province, and even some cities, had set up its own autonomous junta in 1810, and quickly discussions arose how to work together. Two parties emerged, which were constantly at odds: the federalists and the centralists. Eventually two states were founded, the Federalist First Republic of New Granada and the Centralist Free and Independent State of Cundinamarca, that fought each other in a Civil war between 1812 and 1814. This prolonged period of instability eventually favored the Spanish reconquest in 1815.

The north and the south of present-day Colombia remained under Royalist control and several battles were fought to bring these area's under Patriot control, with limited success.
The Magdalena Campaign resulted in taking control of the Magdalena River, which connects the port city of Cartagena with the interior of Colombia, but failed to conquer the important port of Santa Marta .
Nariño's Southern Campaign (December 1813-May 1814) was initially successful, but in May 1814, Antonio Nariño suffered a crushing defeat in the Battle of Ejidos de Pasto and was taken prisoner.
And in neighbouring Venezuela, Simon Bolivar succeeded in creating the Second Republic of Venezuela (1813–1814) after his Admirable Campaign, but this Republic was destroyed in 1814 by llanero troops, which had remained loyal to Spain.

== Spanish Reconquest (1815–1819) ==
Shortly after his restoration to the Spanish throne in December 1813, King Ferdinand VII decided to send a military force to reconquer the Spanish Empire in America, which had fallen into the hands of nationalist forces.

The military expedition of 1815, the strongest ever sent to America until then, included approximately sixty ships and 10,000 men. Colonel Pablo Morillo, a veteran of the Spanish war against France, was placed at the head of what would lead to the reconquest of the northern colonies, putting an end, after five years, to the de facto independence of Colombia .

The Siege of Cartagena (1815) initiated the reconquest of neo-Grenadian territory. After taking Cartagena, the Spanish attacked the rest of the country on three fronts (Morillo from Cartagena, Sebastián de la Calzada from Venezuela, and Juan de Sámano, the future viceroy of New Granada, from Pasto), which ended with the defeat of the Patriots after the Battle of Cuchilla del Tambo in June 1816. In view of the advance of the expeditionary force, internal disputes between the Republicans diminished, but remained a major obstacle, despite an attempt by the government of the United Provinces to resolve them. No mutual aid between provinces, although essential, was sent.

The reconquest completed, a campaign of terror began during which many Colombian patriots were executed for treason. Others, like Francisco de Paula Santander, retreated to the eastern plains, near the border with Venezuela, to try to reorganize political and military forces to face the new adversary.

== Liberation of New Granada (1819–1824) ==
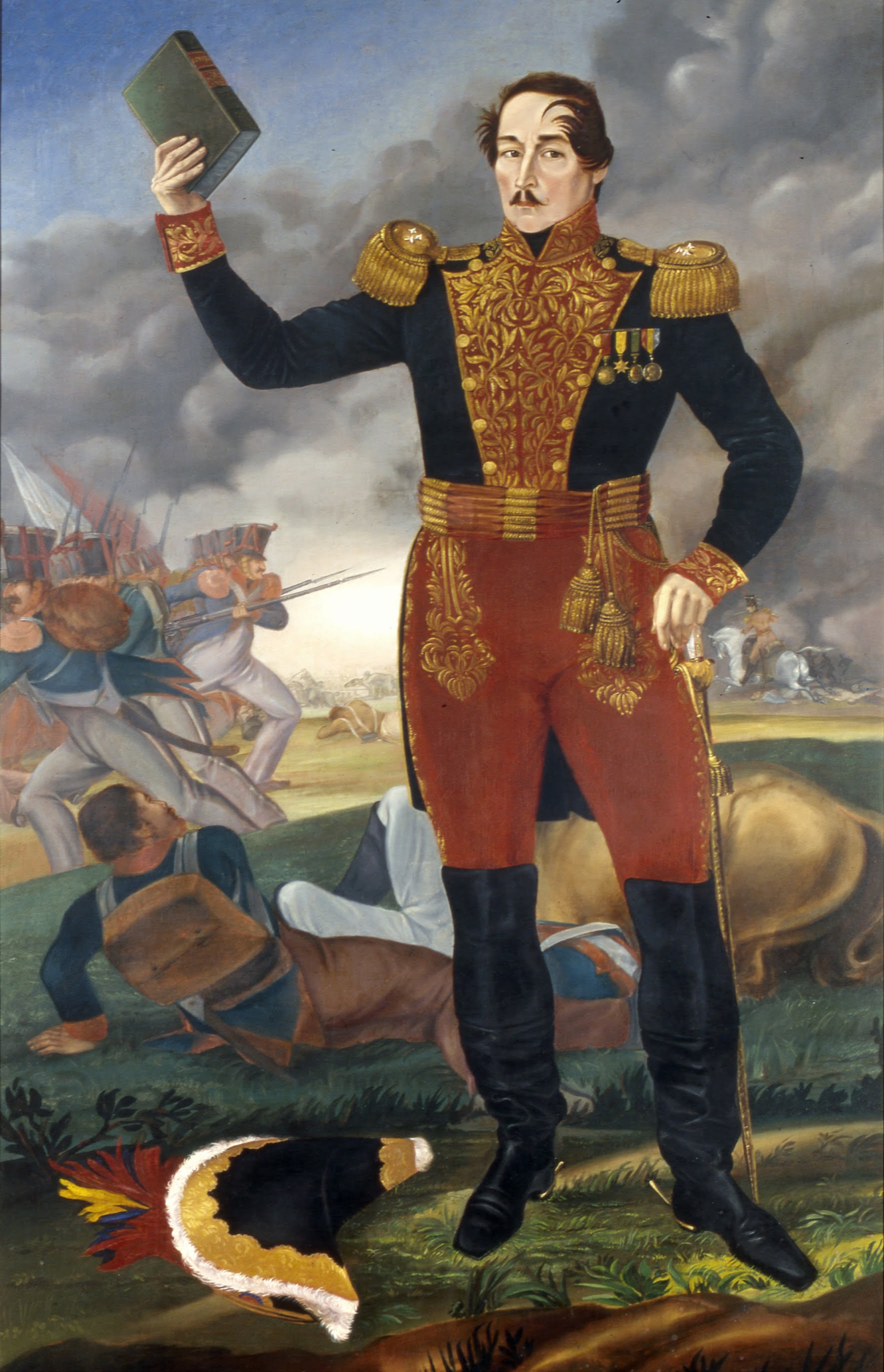
Painting of Francisco de Paula Santander in the battlefield holding the Constitution, made by José María Espinosa.

In May 1819, Simon Bolivar and his Colombian army crossed the Cordillera Oriental during the rainy season, and took the Spanish by surprise when his emerged in Colombia from the mountains on 5 July. In a series of battles the Republican army cleared its way to Bogotá. First at the Battle of Vargas Swamp on 25 July, Bolívar intercepted a Royalist force attempting to reinforce the poorly defended capital. On 7 August 1819, he gained a decisive victory at the Battle of Boyacá, where the bulk of the Royalist army surrendered to Bolívar.

On receiving the news of the defeat, viceroy Juan de Sámano and the rest of Royalist government fled Santafé de Bogotá to Cartagena. In the afternoon of 10 August Bolívar's army entered Bogotá without any Royalist resistance.

On November 25th, 1820, General Bolivar would sign a treaty. The next day, November 26th, General Morillo of Spain would follow suit in ratifying the treaty. Notably, this occurred prior to the Spanish Monarch's recognition of New Granada's independence, which indicated that the signing did not mark the end to the movement.

Cartagena was taken in 1821 along with the entire Caribbean coast, while the Southern provinces and present-day Ecuador were liberated from the Spanish in 1822–24. Afterwards, Simón Bolívar continued his southern campaigns into modern-day Peru and Bolivia, leaving Francisco de Paula Santander, his vice-president, in charge of the government of the newly created Republic of Colombia.

== Opposing forces during the conflict ==
Patriots			Royalists	
Centralists (1810–1814)	Federalists (1811–1816)	Unified (1816–1826)	Bonapartists (1810–1813)	Fernandists (1810–1826)
Defeated by the Federalists	Defeated by the Royalists	Won the war	Defeated by the Fernandists	Defeated by the Patriots
Supreme Government Junta of Santa Fe in New Granada (1810–1811) (Cundinamarca Department) Free and Independent State of Cundinamarca (1811–1814): (Cundinamarca Department) Province of Santa Fe (1811–1814); (Cundinamarca Department) Province of Chocó (1811–1813); (Cundinamarca Department) Province of Mariquita (1811–1814)	United Provinces of New Granada (1811–1816): Republic of Tunja (1811–1816); (Antioquia Department) Free State of Antioquia (1811–1816); (United Provinces of New Granada) Free State of Cartagena (1811–1816); Province of Neiva (1811–1816); Province of New Pamplona (1811–1816); (Valle del Cauca Department) Confederated Cities of Valle del Cauca (1811–1816); Province of Socorro (1812–1816); Province of Casanare (1813–1816); Province of Chocó (1813–1816); (Cundinamarca Department) Free State of Cundinamarca (1814–1816); Free State of Mariquita (1813–1816); Republic of Venezuela (1813–1814)	Exiled Army of New Granada (1816–1819): Province of Casanare (1813–1819); Republic of Venezuela (1817–1819) (Gran Colombia) Republic of Colombia (1819–1826): Republic of Peru (1824–1827); (Bolivia) Republic of Bolívar (1825); Republic of the Floridas (1817) Free Province of Guayaquil (1820–1822) United Provinces of the Río de la Plata (1821–1825): Protectorate of Peru (1821–1822); Republic of Chile (1821–1825) Republic of Peru (1822–1824) Support: United Kingdom (1815–1825): (United Kingdom) Colony of Jamaica (1815–1825); Republic of Haiti (1816–1819) United Kingdom of the Netherlands (1815–1819): (Netherlands) Colony of Curaçao (1815–1819)	Kingdom of Spain and the Indies (1810–1813) Support: Empire of France (1815–1825)	Regency of the Kingdom of Spain and the Indies (1810–1813) Kingdom of Spain (1813–1826) (Spain) Viceroyalty of New Granada (1810–1822): (Spain) Kingdom of New Granada (1810–1819); (Spain) Kingdom of Venezuela (1810–1821); (Spain) Kingdom of Quito (1810–1822); (Spain) Viceroyalty of Peru (1820–1826): (Spain) Kingdom of Peru (1820–1826); (Spain) Kingdom of Cusco (1820–1826); (Spain) Kingdom of Charcas (1820–1825)

== See also ==
- Timeline of the Spanish American Wars of Independence
- Independence of Colombia
- Public holidays in Colombia
- Campaigns of the South
- Viceroyalty of New Granada topics
