= Puerto Cabello Municipality =

Puerto Cabello Municipality Municipio Puerto Cabello
- Municipality
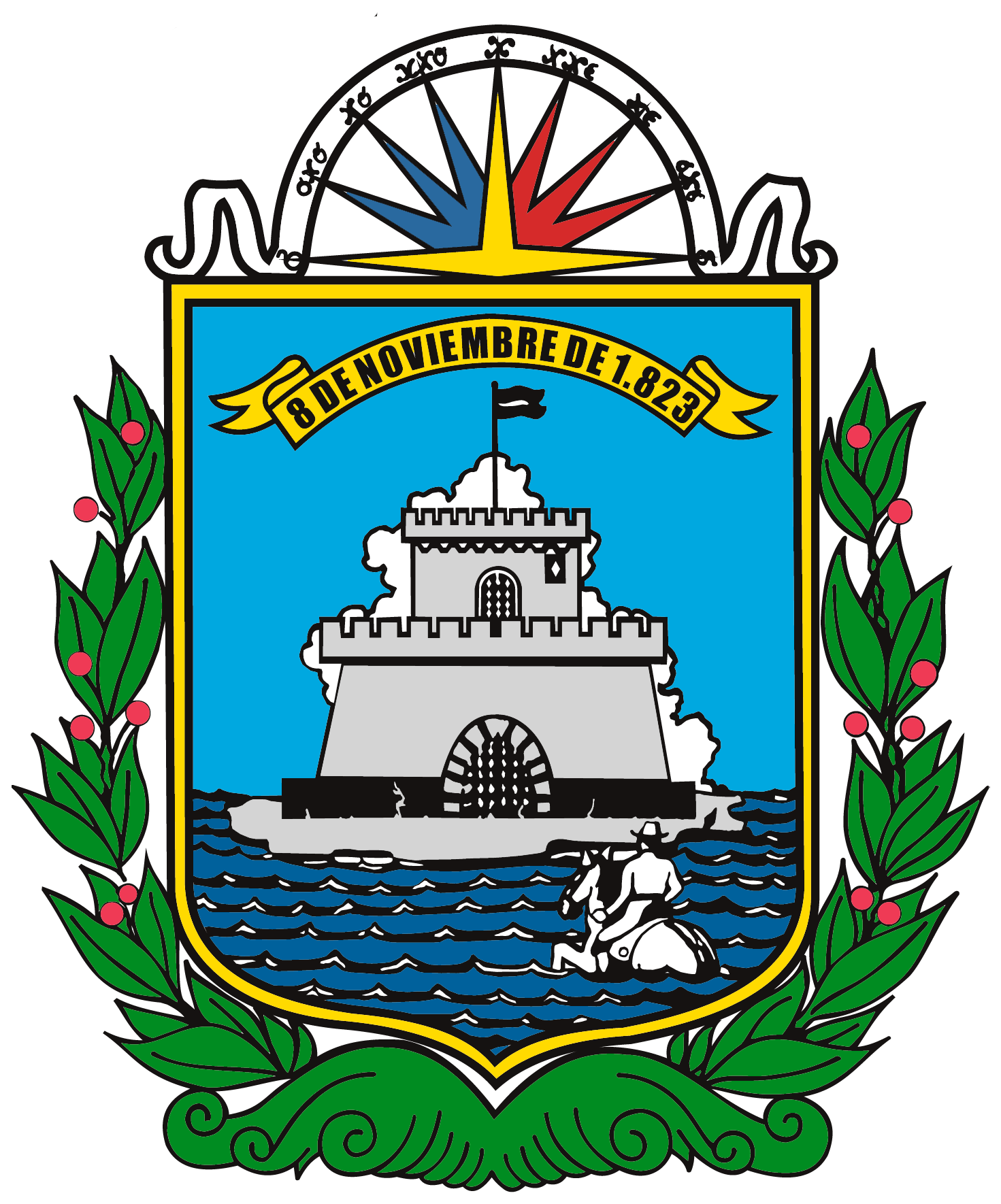
- Coat of arms

- Location in Carabobo

- Location in Venezuela
- Coordinates: 10°27′51″N 68°01′39″W
- Country: Venezuela
- State: Carabobo
- Municipal seat: Puerto Cabello

Government
  - Mayor: Juan Carlos Betancourt (PSUV)

Area
  - Total: 545.5 km^{2} (210.6 sq mi)

Population (2011)
  - Total: 182,493
  - Density: 334.5/km^{2} (866.5/sq mi)
- Time zone: UTC−4 (VET)
- Area code(s): 0242

The Puerto Cabello Municipality (correct coordinates: 1028 N., 70W) is one of the 14 municipalities (municipios) that makes up the Venezuelan state of Carabobo. According to the 2011 census by the National Institute of Statistics of Venezuela, the municipality has a population of 182,493. The city of Puerto Cabello is the shire town of the Puerto Cabello Municipality.

== History ==
Due to Puerto Cabello's location it was attacked by buccaneers and was a popular market for Dutch smugglers during the colonial era. It was the last Spanish royalist stronghold during Venezuela's war for independence, it was captured by José Antonio Páez in May 1823.

== Demographics ==
The Puerto Cabello Municipality, according to a 2007 population estimate by the National Institute of Statistics of Venezuela, has a population of 194,593 (up from 176,552 in 2000). This amounts to 8.7% of the state's population. The municipality's population density is 448.37 inhabitants per square kilometre (1,161.3/sq mi).

== Government ==
The mayor of the Puerto Cabello Municipality is Rafael Lacava, elected on November 23, 2008, with 58% of the vote. He replaced Osmel Vicente Ramos Dolande shortly after the elections. The municipality is divided into eight parishes: Bartolomé Salom, Borburata, Democracia, Fraternidad, Goaigoaza, Juan José Flores, Patanemo, and Unión.

== See also ==
- Puerto Cabello
- Carabobo
- Municipalities of Venezuela
