= El Peñol, Nariño =

El Peñol
- Municipality and town
- Flag

- Location of the municipality and town of El Peñol in the Nariño Department of Colombia
- Coordinates: 1°27′13″N 77°26′23″W
- Country: Colombia
- Department: Nariño
- Time zone: UTC-5 (Colombia Standard Time)

El Peñol is a town and municipality in the Nariño Department, Colombia.
