= Agustín Agualongo =

Colombian military officer (1780–1824)

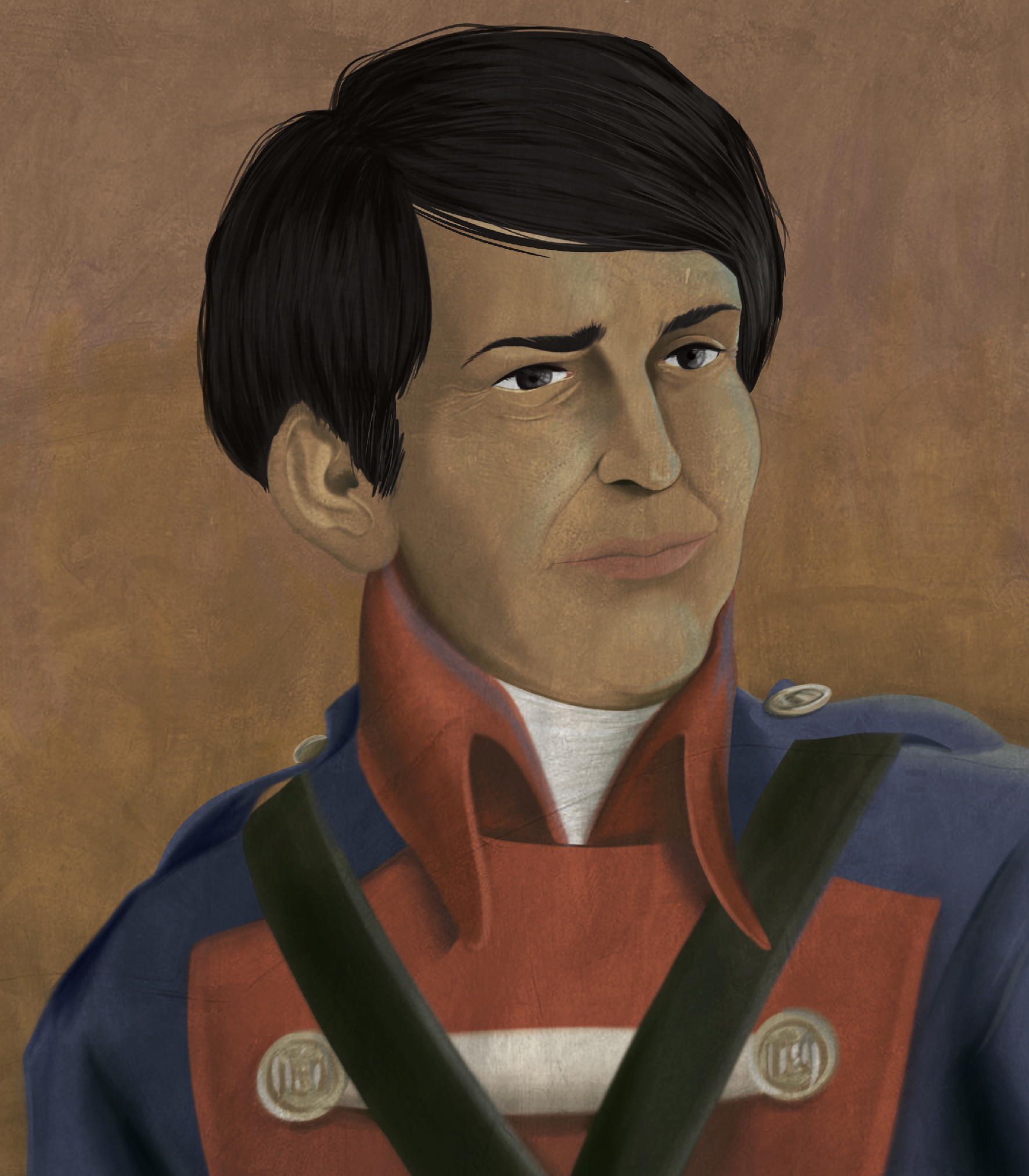
Portrait of Agustín Agualongo

Agustín Agualongo (25 August 1780 in San Juan de Pasto – 13 July 1824 in Popayán) was a commander on the Royalist side in the wars for Colombian independence. A mestizo who chose to support the royalist cause, he rose quickly in rank with victories against republican offensives in the Popayán region. He went on to lead attacks against republicans in the Real Audiencia of Quito. The republicans grew in strength after the Battle of Carabobo and, after Popayán was sacked, Agualongo was captured and executed.

== Background ==
Agualongo was born in San Juan de Pasto on 25 August 1780. Contemporary historian of the Colombian republic, José Manuel Restrepo Vélez described Aqualongo as an indigenous man, but modern interpretations of his birth certificate have found that his parents were mestizo. He was born in San Juan de Pasto in 1780. A traditional account has him working for a wealthy family in that city and acquiring his name from their calls for an Indian to bring them water "agua, longo", but there is no evidence to support this. Agualongo is known to have worked as a painter.

The French-instigated replacement of Charles IV of Spain with his son Ferdinand VII and then by Joseph Bonaparte led to a republican movement in Colombia. In the face of growing republicanism Agualongo joined a Royalist militia at Popayán in 1811, to resist any attempted republican advances from Cali and Santa Fe. Restrepo characterised Agualongo as fighting for the Royalist cause out of ignorance and that he lacked the capacity to perceive the republicans as the more righteous cause. Modern historians have found the indigenous and mestizo peoples were highly engaged in the colonial economy, knew Hispanic law and followed politics.

== Military service ==
Agqualongo served under Colonel Basilio García during a retreat from Quito. Agualongo took part in Royalist victories over forces sent against Popayán by the republican juntas in Quito and Cali in 1811. He was recognised for his abilities, particularly in a victory he won against forces commanded by Antonio Nariño, and quickly rose through the ranks. He went on to win further victories on an offensive in the Real Audiencia of Quito. By 1820 he was serving under Colonel Francisco González de Castejón at Ambato, Huachi and Cuenca. Agualongo had become a lieutenant-colonel by 1822.

After Simón Bolívar's 1821 victory at the Battle of Carabobo he turned his attention to the Pasto region, whose Royalist-supporting population blocked the road to Quito. The region was burned and sacked by Bolívar in 1822 and 1823. Agualongo, who by 1823 was a colonel, continued to resist the Republicans and tried to link with Royalists in Peru, recapturing Pasto.

He was captured by Bolívar's forces and executed in Popayán on 13 July 1824, unaware that he had achieved the rank of general. His last words were "Viva el rey!" or "Long live the king!" His remains were interred in a church in Popayán. In 1987, they were taken away by a cell of the guerrilla group M-19 led by Antonio Navarro Wolff. The remains were only returned in 1990.
