= Orinoca =

- Location in Bolivia
- Coordinates: 18°58′02″S 67°15′30″W
- Country: Bolivia
- Department: Oruro Department
- Province: Sud Carangas Province
- Elevation: 12,428 ft (3,788 m)

Population (2001)
  - Total: 163
- Time zone: UTC-4 (BOT)

Orinoca is a small town in the Bolivian Oruro Department.

Orinoca had 163 inhabitants as of 2001 and is the administrative center of Orinoca District. It is located at 3,788 m above sea-level, 185 km south of the department's capital, Oruro, and 20 km west of Lake Poopó. (Note: The second-largest lake in Bolivia was dried up as of December 2015, except for a few marshy patches, and officials do not know if it can recover from an extended drought.)

Orinoca is accessible by road, and a bus service that serves the town twice a week.

The village of Isallavi in the Orinoca District is the birthplace of Evo Morales, the President of Bolivia from 2006 to 2019.
