= Orinoca Canton =

Orinoca is a district (cantón) in the Andamarca Municipality in the Bolivian Sud Carangas Province in Oruro Department.

== Location ==
The Orinoca District is located at 18°58′S 67°15′W, 3,800 m above sea-level, on the western shore of Lake Poopó, 180 km (115 mi) south of Oruro. Its extension from north to south and from east to west is 35 km. In December 2015, the lake was declared dried up, except for some marshy patches. People in the area had relied on the lake for water for personal and agricultural use.

== Population ==
The population of the district increased at 34.0% from 1,259 inhabitants (census 1992) to 1,687 inhabitants (2001). There is no urban population in this district. 44.9% of the population are younger than 15 years old; the rate of literacy is 77.7% (1992).

According to studies in 1992, the most spoken language in the province is Aymara, spoken by 97.0%, while 76.7% of the population speak Spanish and 43.3% Quechua (1992). 71.4% of the population are Catholic, 17.5% are Anglican Protestant (1992).

The village of Isallawi in the Orinoca District is the birthplace of Evo Morales, President of Bolivia from 2006 to 2019.

=== Living standards ===
97.5% of the population have no access to running water or sanitary facilities; 100.0% have no electricity (1992).

== Economy and infrastructure ==
The rural population is largely dedicated to agriculture (potatoes, wheat, corn and onions) and raising herds of llamas and vicuñas. Orinoca is accessible only by road; a bus service that reaches the town twice a week.

== Division ==
The district is subdivided in the following subdistricts and hamlets and villages (localidades), in brackets the population of 2001:

- Orinoca (Parantorre) (1.081)
  - Comunidad Agua Cruz (67)
  - Comunidad Ancorcaya (202)
  - Lagiloma (12)
  - Estancia Lloco (94)
  - Estancia Mara Mara (146)
  - Orinoca (163)
  - Comunidad Parantorre (7)
  - Estancia Pucarani (59)
  - Thola Loma (1)
  - Estancia Tunavi (87)
  - Estancia Ichucollo (18)
  - Calavillca (159)
  - Chauca (66)
- Vice Canton Chihuo (167)
  - Ayllu Ichura 107
  - Chihuo 60
- Ayllu Ichura (261)
  - Estancia Pataquiri 82
  - Comunidad Rosa Pata 179
- Calavillca (86)
  - Lagiloma 27
  - Thola Loma 59
- Ucumasi (47)
  - Ucumasi (47)
- Ayllu Inchura (45)
  - San Cristobal De Pallini (45)
