= Domestic policy of the Evo Morales administration =

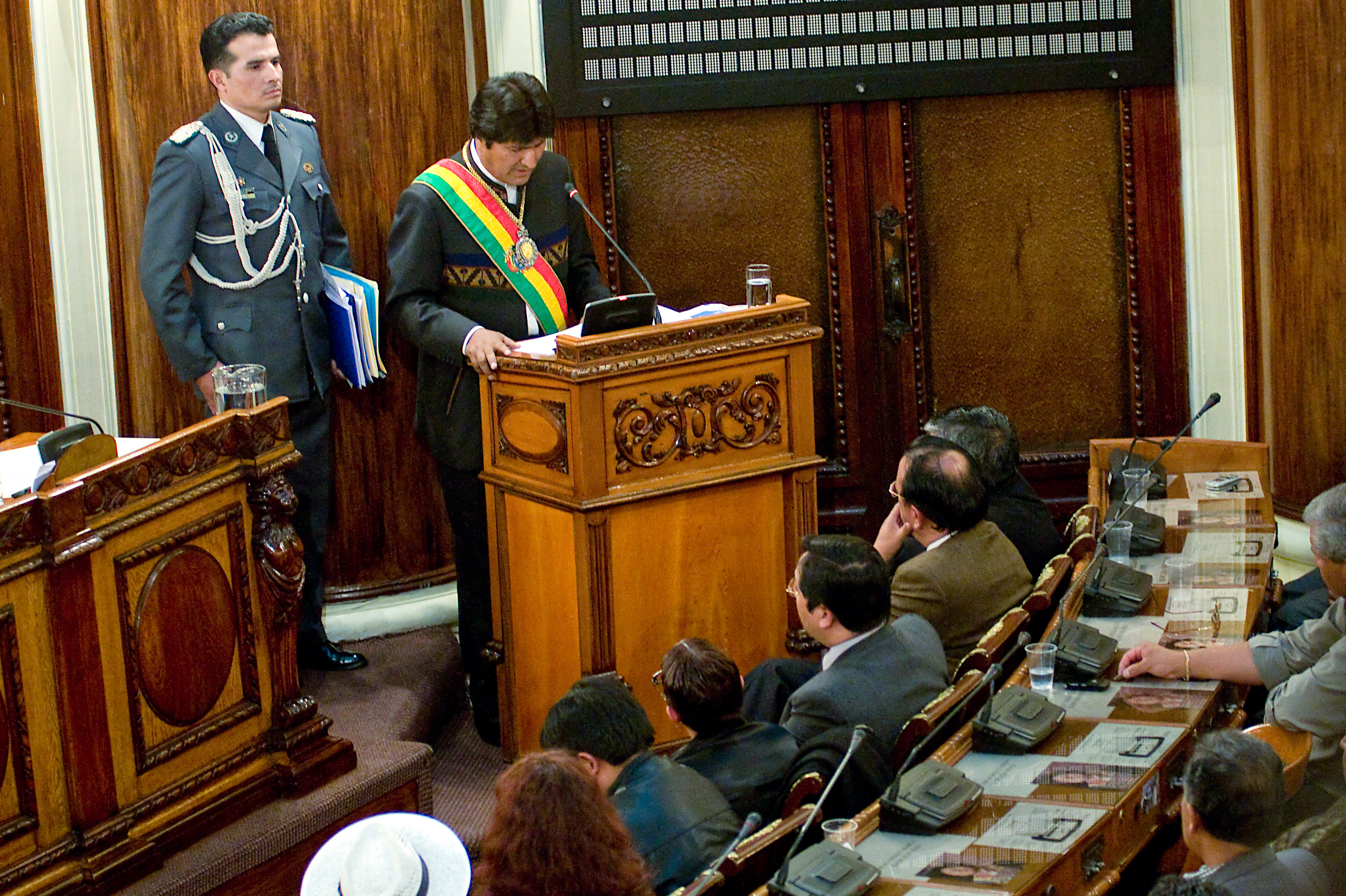
Evo Morales addressing the Bolivian congress in 2008

The domestic policy of the Evo Morales administration refers to the domestic policy initiatives of the former President of Bolivia, including past pre-presidential advocacies by Morales.

== Politics ==
Morales articulated the driving force behind MAS in the following terms:

The worst enemy of humanity is U.S. capitalism. That is what provokes uprisings like our own, a rebellion against a system, against a neoliberal model, which is the representation of savage capitalism. If the entire world doesn't acknowledge this reality, that nation states are not providing even minimally for health, education and nourishment, then each day the most fundamental human rights are being violated.

He also stated:

... the ideological principles of the organization, anti-imperialist and contrary to neoliberalism, are clear and firm but its members have yet to turn them into a programmatic reality.

Morales has argued for the establishment of a constituent assembly to transform the country. He also proposed the creation of a new hydrocarbon law to guarantee Bolivia at least 50% of its revenue, although MAS has also shown interest in the complete nationalization of the gas and oil industries. Morales has taken a middle ground: supporting the nationalization of natural gas companies, but supporting foreign cooperation in the industry.

Morales has referred to the U.S.-driven Free Trade Area of the Americas as "an agreement to legalize the colonization of the Americas" and has supported the stated desire of Venezuelan President Hugo Chávez to form an "Axis of Good" between Bolivia, Cuba, and Venezuela, in contrast to the "Axis of Evil" comprising the United States and its allies.

In March 2006, President Evo Morales announced in Santa Cruz an increase in the minimum wage by 50%. As it is currently set at 440 bolivianos(45 euros) per month, it would then increase to 660 bolivianos (67 euros) per month. Morales had earlier stated that it should be increased by 100%. However, 6 out of 10 workers are part of the informal economy, thus limiting the impact of this increase.

Fulfilling a campaign promise, Morales opened on August 6, 2006, an assembly to begin writing a new constitution aimed at giving more power to the indigenous majority.

== Education reform ==
=== Indigenous languages in schools ===
Morales supports a movement to teach indigenous languages such as Aymara, Quechua, and Guarani which are spoken mainly in the rural areas of Bolivia. His government estimates that only 37% of the population speaks a native language that predates the introduction of Spanish in the 16th century. Morales's Education Ministry has declared the drive to increase this percentage as part of a broad effort "to decolonize the mindset and the Bolivian state." The program is seen as "emblematic of his government's indigenous-based social agenda". In 2006 Morales's Minister of Education and Culture, Félix Patzi, announced that he would require all government employees to take indigenous language training. The Morales government's proposal to require all state schools to teach the languages has angered many urban Bolivians who see it as a move to replace Spanish. This is denied by the Morales government who point out that over half of Bolivians claim indigenous heritage and that it should not be shameful to speak an indigenous language outside of the home or local community. Patzi brought further controversy to the movement by calling Bolivians who can't speak an indigenous language "an embarrassment" and by issuing a letter stating that no school would be recognized unless they guaranteed indigenous language instruction in the 2007 academic year.

=== Reform of religious classes in state schools ===
In June 2005, Minister Félix Patzi brought organizational opposition against the Morales governments' ideas when he declared that "Catholicism would no longer be 'the official' religion taught at schools." After mass protests led by the Catholic hierarchy this proposal was shelved by Morales.

=== Aftermath ===
Morales, initially supportive of Patzi and his policies, faced with the opposition of the Catholic hierarchy dropped the proposal to change the religion classes in state schools. Morales also relaxed the language requirement, no longer requiring it to be obligatory in 2007. In late January 2007, Morales replaced several members of his cabinet, including Patzi whose suggestions had "got Morales in hot water with the Roman Catholic Church". The Bolivian media reported that this cabinet shuffle "reduced the number of ministers of indigenous descent, and incorporated more middle-class politicians from the radical left to his cabinet."

== Economy ==
=== Nationalization of natural gas industry ===
In 2005, following popular protests and president Gonzalo Sánchez "Goni" de Lozada's resignation, Congress passed an energy law that added a 32% tax on production to an already-existing 18% royalty. It also required that companies renegotiate their contracts with the state.

As of May 1, 2006, President Morales signed a decree stating that all natural gas reserves were to be nationalized: "the state recovers ownership, possession and total and absolute control" of hydrocarbons (Bolivia has the second largest resources of natural gas in South America — 1.38 trillion cubic meters — after Venezuela). He thus put to some effect his electoral promises made during the various Gas Wars, declaring that "We are not a government of mere promises: We follow through on what we propose and what the people demand."

The announcement was timed to coincide with Worker's Day on May 1. Ordering the military and engineers of YPFB, the state firm, to occupy and secure energy installations, he gave foreign companies a six-month "transition period" to re-negotiate contracts, or face expulsion. Nevertheless, Morales stated that the nationalization would not take the form of expropriations or confiscations. Vice President Álvaro García said in La Paz's main plaza that the government's energy-related revenue will jump to $780 million in 2007, expanding nearly sixfold from 2002.

Among the 53 installations affected by the measure are those of Petrobras, one of the largest foreign investors in Bolivia, which controls 14% of the country's gas reserves. Brazil's Energy Minister, Silas Rondeau, reacted by condemning the move as "unfriendly" and contrary to previous understandings between his country and Bolivia.

ExxonMobil, Petrobras, Repsol YPF, BG Group and TotalEnergies are the main gas companies present in the country. According to Reuters, "Bolivia's actions echo what Venezuelan President Hugo Chávez, possibly Morales' biggest ally, did in the world's fifth-largest oil exporter with forced contract migrations and retroactive tax hikes — conditions that major oil companies largely agreed to accept." YPFB will pay foreign companies for their services, offering about 50% of the value of production, although the decree indicated that companies exploiting the country's two largest gas fields would get just 18%.

=== Nationalization of smelter ===
On February 8, 2007, Morales announced that a metal processing plant outside of the city of Oruro owned by the Swiss mining company Glencore International AG would be nationalized. The plant processes tin, lead, and silver. Morales said that there had been "a lack of transparency in its financial dealings" and that corporations that abide by Bolivian law had nothing to fear. He said "Companies that respect Bolivian laws, that do not steal money from the Bolivian people, will be respected. But if the companies do not respect the laws, I have no other alternative than to recover those companies." Vinto was privatized by the Banzer government in 2000, when it was sold to London-based Allied Deals. However, Allied Deals promptly went bankrupt and was unable to meet its commitments, forcing the government to liquidate the asset. The liquidating entity Grant Thornton sold Vinto to Compañía Minera Colquiri, owned by Compañía Minera del Sur (51%) and Great Britain's Commonwealth Development Corporation (49%), in June 2002. Glencore purchased the plant from Comsur-CDC in 2004.

== Coca ==
=== Background ===
==== Licit and illicit uses ====
Coca is the raw material for cocaine but is prized by many Bolivians (especially among those of Amero-Indian descent) for its traditional uses in medicines and herbal teas. Long before coca was used to make cocaine, the indigenous people of the Andean region, the Aymara and Quechua, chewed coca leaves as a dietary supplement, a means to ease pangs of hunger and thirst and an antidote for altitude sickness. Many Amero-Indians continue to view the plant as sacred. In modern Bolivia, coca leaves may be legally consumed and are most often prepared in teas like mate de coca. The legal sale and consumption of coca leaves are part of daily life for some groups of Bolivian peasants, especially those in mining and other fields of heavy labor. Noted celebrities who have consumed coca tea include Pope John Paul II and The Princess Royal. While a limited market exists for coca leaves, since the early 1990s the United States has put pressure on the Bolivian government to reduce the amount of coca leaves produced for refinement by the international drug trade.

==== Plan Dignidad ====
In 1995 at the height of coca production, one out of every eight Bolivians made a living from coca. The country was the world's third largest grower of coca after Peru and Colombia. In 1997, 458 square kilometres of land were being used to produce coca leaves, with only 120 km^{2} of that being grown for the licit market. In August 1997, with strong support of the US government, Bolivian President Hugo Banzer developed "Plan Dignidad" ("The Dignity Plan") to counter the "scourge" of drugs. The plan focused on eradication, interdiction (through lab destruction), efforts to counter money laundering, and implementation of social programs that countered and prevented drug addiction. The plan's heavy emphasis on plant eradication and noticeable lack of focus on trafficking organizations was noted by its critics at the time. The US Embassy in Bolivia defended the aggressive focus on crops, maintaining that Bolivia was devoid of significant trafficking organizations and claiming that the bulk of illegally exported coca went through small 'mom-and-pop' operations. This claim continues to be rejected by scholars of Bolivian society who say "Bolivia is very vulnerable to the influence of international trafficking organizations and that it is very likely that the participation of Bolivian entrepreneurs in the illegal business has increased." During the initial years of the operation area of coca production dropped. While in 1997 it had been 458 km^{2}, by 1998 it was down to 380 km^{2}; in 1999 it fell to 218 km^{2}, and in 2000 it reached its lowest point at 146 km^{2}. Since the 1990s, the US has been funding the Bolivian government's eradication program by an average of $150 million a year.

==== Opposition to eradication, rise of Morales ====
Critics of the aggressive focus on farmers and the program's lack of effort against traffickers argued against the claims that Bolivia's traffickers were only "mom-and-pop organizations". They pointed out the increase in prices offered to Peruvian coca farmers during 1998 as proof that international trafficking organizations were going to Peru to make up for the Bolivian shortfall caused by the program. They also pointed to the 1999 indictment for drug trafficking of Marino Diodato who was married to the niece of President Banzer, and was an Italian believed to have Mafia and Camorra ties. By 2001 coca planting in Bolivia moved outside of the traditional growing areas of Chapare and Yungas and the area in production began to climb ever since.

Along with an increase in worldwide coca production, the program contributed to a decline in the real standard of living of Chapare peasants leading to protests and violent social unrest (where both demonstrators and police were slain). The Bolivian government's use of the military in coca-growing regions during the unrest brought criticism from NGOs such as Human Rights Watch. Promises of alternative development for farmers stagnated because of worsening external economic conditions. These conditions caused social mobilization among coca farmers like Evo Morales who called for an end to forced eradication and other measures enacted with the intent of countering narcotics. From 2000 forward, the Bolivian government made several agreements with coca grower federations to end confrontations, but they failed to follow through on their promises causing further opposition to these governments. Morales rose to national attention by leading the political opposition to eradication and this position is a central reason for his election to the Bolivian Congress. His association with anti-eradication forces caused his expulsion from Congress in 2002 which led to his presidential campaign with its surprising showing that same year.

==== Morales coalition prevails ====
Pressures from the Morales-led coalition caused president Gonzalo Sánchez de Lozada to stop forced eradication. To address some of his opponents concerns in 2003 he initially proposed allowing families to cultivate small plots of coca but in the face of strong pressure from the US Embassy he withdrew the idea. Gonzalo Sánchez de Lozada resigned the presidency due to the Bolivian Gas War. When his successor Carlos Mesa was unable to stem the increasing conflict over distribution of wealth from fossil fuel production he also resigned. Morales's support from coca farmers was seen as a large reason for his victory to the open presidential office in the 2005 election.

On his way to vote during the 2005 election Morales carried a coca plant. After it was declared that he was the front runner in the election he called for a referendum on how the plant should be controlled. Countering US fears that he would ignore coca cultivation expressly done for narcotic purposes Morales said, "There won't be the free cultivation of the coca leaf." He also called on America to enter into an agreement with Bolivia to truly fight drug trafficking. He repeated his position calling for "zero cocaine production and zero drug trafficking, but not zero coca growing or zero cocaleros [coca growers]." He announced his government would study whether the amount of coca allowed for legal traditional consumption should be increased. At the time coca growing was legal on 29,000 acres (120 km^{2}) of the Yungas valley with lesser area in the Chapare region.

=== Morales Presidency ===
In early 2006, soon after taking office, Morales traveled to the tropical region of Chapare and met with a crowd of 20,000 consisting mainly cocaleros. A garland of coca leaves was placed around his neck and more leaves placed upon a straw hat he donned to shield him from the sun. He told the crowd, "The fight for coca symbolizes our fight for freedom. Coca growers will continue to grow coca. There will never be zero coca."

There is much disagreement between Morales's administration and the United States regarding anti-drug laws and cooperation between the countries, but officials from both countries have expressed a common desire to work against drug trafficking, with Sean McCormack from the U.S. State Department reinforcing the support of Bolivian anti-drug policy, and Morales repeatedly calling for zero cocaine production and zero drug trafficking.

==== Processing plant ====
In February 2007, Venezuela loaned Bolivia $250,000 to build two coca processing plants in Chapare and Las Yungas to turn coca into tea and trimate (a mixture of aniseed, chamomile and coca). The plants are set to be up and running in September or October 2007 and the products will likely be sold in Venezuela.

== Constitutional Assembly ==
One of Morales's electoral promises was to establish a Constitutional Assembly to re-write the Bolivian constitution. This was also one of the central demands of the Bolivian social and indigenous movements who supported Morales's candidature for the presidency. A Constitutional Assembly was established and elections for assembly members were held in July 2006. The Assembly then sat in Sucre, in the Teatro Gran Mariscal and was given 12 months to write a new Bolivian constitution. The process of drafting the constitution was initially stalled by debates over voting procedures (whether a simple majority or two-thirds majority should be required to make decisions) and then by the introduction of an arcane debate about which should be Bolivia's capital city, Sucre or La Paz. The draft Constitution was finally approved in December 2007, in a session which took place in Oruro. Although most of the members of the opposition party, PODEMOS, absented themselves from the session, the assembly was able to pass the draft constitution with the two-thirds majority required.

=== Constitutional referendum ===
In mid-October 2008, a deal was reached to press ahead with a referendum on a new constitution after Morales acceded to demands not to run for more than one more term. The agreement was reached after Morales led a march of more than 100,000 of his supporters on the congress. He told the cheering crowd in La Paz: "Four political parties agreed to make the ratification of the constitution possible, the referendum to approve the constitutional draft will take place on January 25." It was decided that the referendum would take place on 25 January 2009.
