= Isallavi =

- Location in Bolivia
- Coordinates: 18°54′32″S 67°15′40″W
- Country: Bolivia
- Department: Oruro Department
- Province: Sud Carangas Province
- Municipality: Andamarca Municipality
- Canton: Orinoca Canton
- Elevation: 12,411 ft (3,783 m)

Population (2012)
  - Total: 33
- Time zone: UTC-4 (BOT)
- Postal code: 04-1201-0202-1001
- Area code: (+591)

Isallavi (also: Isayavi or Isallawi) is a village in the Bolivian Oruro Department. It is the birthplace of Evo Morales, Bolivia's former President.

Isallavi has 33 inhabitants (2012) and is situated in the Orinoca Canton, a district of Andamarca Municipality in Sud Carangas Province. It is located at 18°54′32″S 67°15′40″W, 3,783 m above sea-level, fifteen kilometers west of Poopó Lake.
