= Evo Morales =

President of Bolivia from 2006 to 2019

Evo Morales OCA OJM OL OS
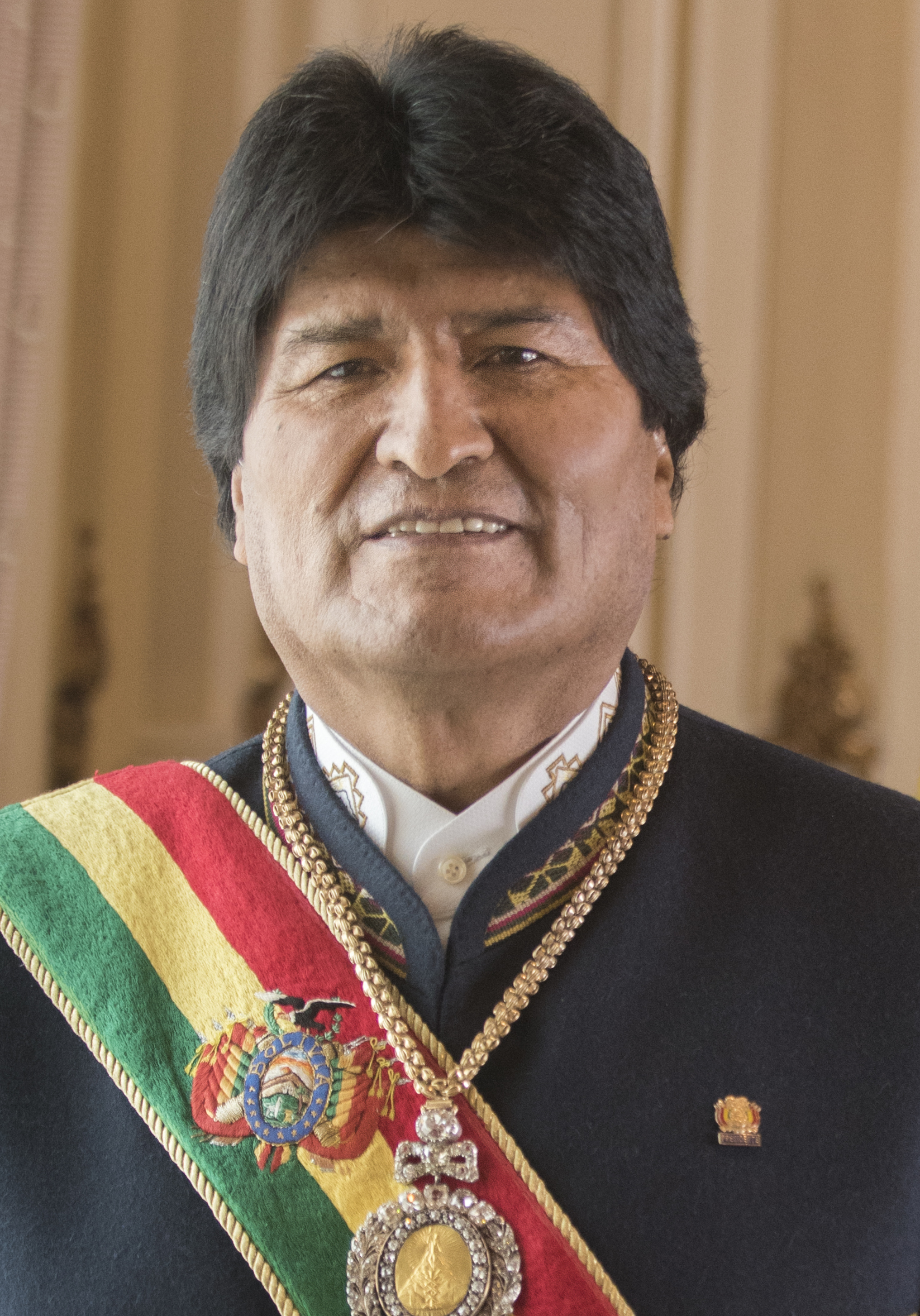
- Morales in 2018

65th President of Bolivia
- In office 22 January 2006 – 12 November 2019
- Vice President: Álvaro García Linera
- Preceded by: Eduardo Rodríguez Veltzé
- Succeeded by: Jeanine Áñez

Member of the Chamber of Deputies from Cochabamba's 27th constituency
- In office 2 August 2002 – 19 January 2006
- Substitute: Luis Cutipa
- Preceded by: Valentín Gutiérrez
- Succeeded by: Asterio Villarroel
- Constituency: Carrasco; Chapare
- In office 2 August 1997 – 24 January 2002
- Substitute: Valentín Gutiérrez
- Preceded by: Seat established
- Succeeded by: Valentín Gutiérrez
- Constituency: Carrasco; Chapare
Party political offices
President of EVO Pueblo
Incumbent
Assumed office 31 March 2025
Preceded by	Party established
President of the Movement Toward Socialism
In office 22 July 1997 – 13 November 2024
Preceded by	David Áñez
Succeeded by	Grover García

Personal details
- Born: Juan Evo Morales Ayma; 26 October 1959 (age 67) Isallavi, Oruro, Bolivia
- Party: Movement Toward Socialism (1997–2025)
- Other political affiliations: EVO Pueblo (since 2025)
- Relatives: Esther Morales (sister)
- Occupation: Politician; trade unionist

Military service
- Allegiance: Bolivia
- Branch/service: Bolivian Army
- Years of service: 1978–1979
- Rank: Private

Juan Evo Morales Ayma (Spanish: [xwan ˈeβo moˈɾales ˈajma]; born 26 October 1959) is a Bolivian politician, trade union organizer, and former cocalero activist who served as the 65th President of Bolivia from 2006 to 2019. Widely regarded as the country's first president to come from its indigenous population, (Note: Morales is described as the first indigenous president of Bolivia in academic studies of his presidency, such as those of Muñoz-Pogossian, Webber, Philip and Panizza, and Farthing and Kohl, as well as in press reports, such as those of BBC News, This claim has been challenged by those who state that Morales probably has some European ancestry, and thus, on genetic grounds, is technically mestizo rather than solely indigenous. Further, former president Enrique Peñaranda was of substantially indigenous origin. Harten said that this argument was "misguided[,] wrong[... and] above all irrelevant" because regardless of his genetic makeup, the majority of Bolivians perceive Morales as being the first indigenous president. In Bolivian society, indigeneity is a fluid concept rooted in cultural identity; for instance, many indigenous individuals that have settled in urban areas and abandoned their traditional rural customs have come to identify as mestizo.) his administration focused on the implementation of leftist policies and combating the influence of the United States and multinational corporations. Ideologically a socialist, he led the Movement Toward Socialism (MAS) party from 1998 to 2024 and now runs the EVO Pueblo party.

Born to an Aymara family of subsistence farmers in Isallawi, Orinoca Canton, Morales undertook a basic education and mandatory military service before moving to the Chapare Province in 1978. Growing coca and becoming a trade unionist, he rose to prominence in the campesino ("rural laborers") union. In that capacity, he campaigned against joint U.S.-Bolivian attempts to eradicate coca as part of the War on Drugs, denouncing these as an imperialist violation of indigenous Andean culture. His involvement in anti-government direct action protests resulted in multiple arrests. Morales entered electoral politics in 1995, was elected to Congress in 1997, and became leader of MAS in 1998. Coupled with populist rhetoric, he campaigned on issues affecting indigenous and poor communities, advocating land reform and more equal redistribution of money from Bolivian gas extraction. He gained increased visibility through the Cochabamba Water War and gas conflict. In 2002, he was expelled from Congress for encouraging anti-government protesters, although he came second in that year's presidential election.

Once elected president in 2005, Morales increased taxation on the hydrocarbon industry to bolster social spending and emphasized projects to combat illiteracy, poverty, and racial and gender discrimination. Vocally criticizing neoliberalism, Morales' government moved Bolivia towards a mixed economy, reduced its dependence on the World Bank and International Monetary Fund (IMF), and oversaw strong economic growth. Scaling back United States influence in the country, he built relationships with leftist governments in the Latin American pink tide, especially Hugo Chávez's Venezuela and Fidel Castro's Cuba, and signed Bolivia into the Bolivarian Alliance for the Americas. His administration opposed the autonomist demands of Bolivia's eastern provinces, won a 2008 recall referendum, and instituted a new constitution that established Bolivia as a plurinational state. Re-elected in 2009 and 2014, he oversaw Bolivia's admission to the Bank of the South and Community of Latin American and Caribbean States, although his popularity was dented by attempts to abolish presidential term limits. Following the disputed 2019 election and ensuing unrest, Morales resigned and went into temporary exile. Returning in 2020, he was removed as MAS leader in 2024 and formed EVO Pueblo as an alternative. He faces arrest warrants for his role in anti-government mass protests and a statutory rape investigation.

Morales' supporters praise his championing of indigenous rights, anti-imperialism, and environmentalism, further crediting him with overseeing significant economic growth, poverty reduction, and increased investment in schools, hospitals, and infrastructure. Critics point to democratic backsliding during his tenure, argue that his policies failed to reflect his environmentalist and pro-indigenous rhetoric, and that his defense of coca contributed to illegal cocaine production.

== Early life and activism ==
=== Childhood, education, and military service: 1959–1978 ===
Morales was born to an Aymara family in the village of Isallawi in Orinoca Canton, Oruro Department, on 26 October 1959. One of seven children born to Dionisio Morales Choque and his wife María Ayma Mamani, only he and two siblings, Esther and Hugo, survived past childhood. His mother almost died from a postpartum haemorrhage following his birth. His childhood home was a traditional adobe house, and he grew up speaking Aymara, although by his presidency was no longer fluent.

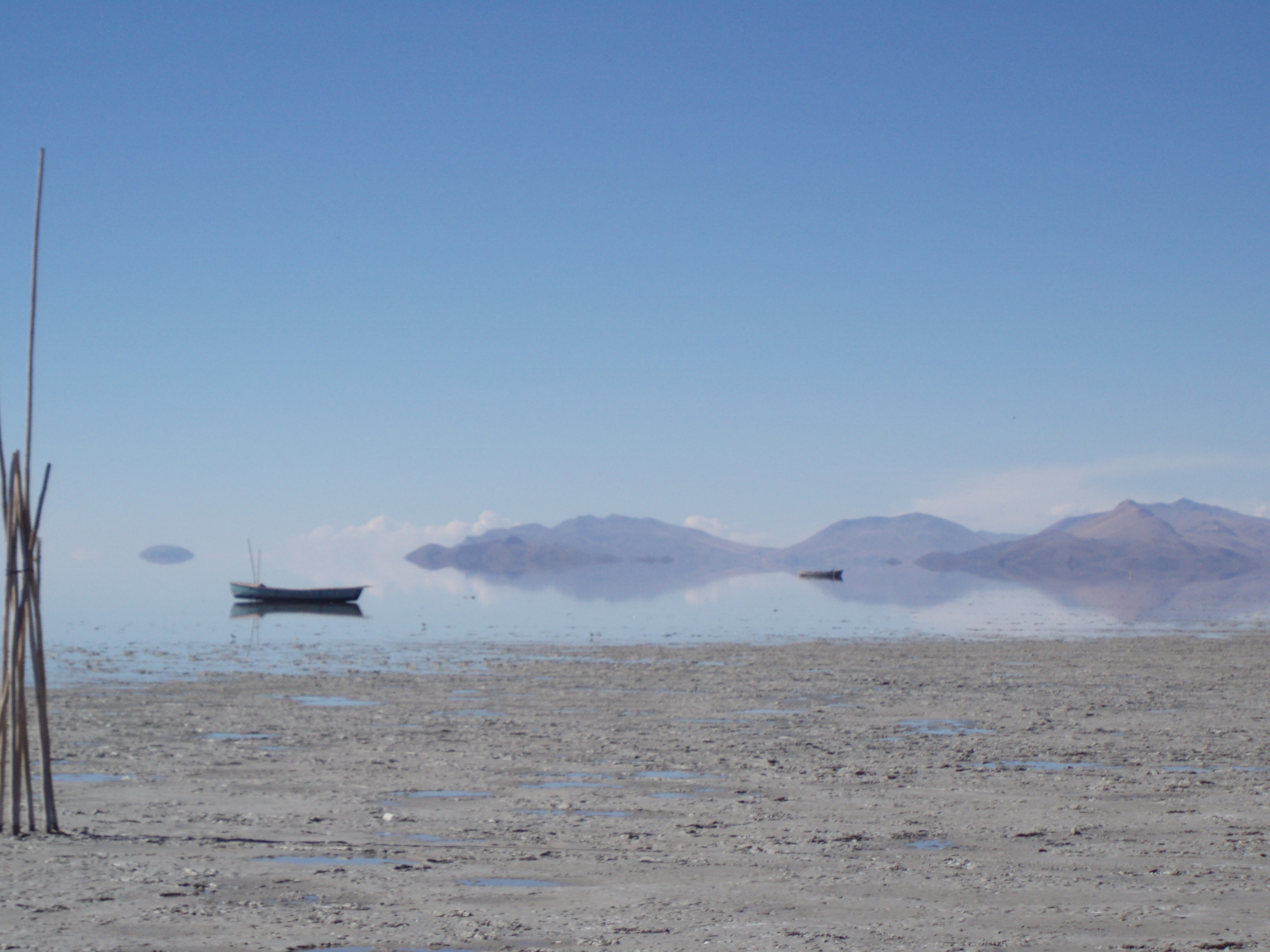
Lake Poopó was the dominant geographical feature around Morales's home village of Isallawi.

Morales' family were farmers and from an early age he helped raise crops and guard their llamas and sheep. Aged 5, he joined the single-room primary school in Isallawi. At age 6, he spent six months in northern Argentina with his sister and father, where he briefly attended a Spanish-language school. As a child, he regularly traveled two weeks on foot to Arani province, Cochabamba with his father to exchange salt and potatoes for maize and coca. Aged 13, he organized a community soccer team with himself as team captain. Within two years, he was elected training coach for the region.

After finishing primary education, Morales attended the Agrarian Humanistic Technical Institute of Orinoca (ITAHO), completing all but the final year. He then studied for a degree in Oruro, finishing in 1977; he had earned money on the side as a brick-maker, day laborer, baker, and trumpet player. Morales served his mandatory military service in the Bolivian Army from 1977 to 1978. Initially signed up at the Centre for Instruction of Special Troops (CITE) in Cochabamba, he was sent into the Fourth Ingavi Cavalry Regiment and stationed at the army headquarters in Bolivia's capital, La Paz. These two years were politically unstable, with five presidents and two military coups; under General David Padilla's regime, Morales was stationed as a guard at the Presidential Palace.

=== Early cocalero activism: 1978–1983 ===
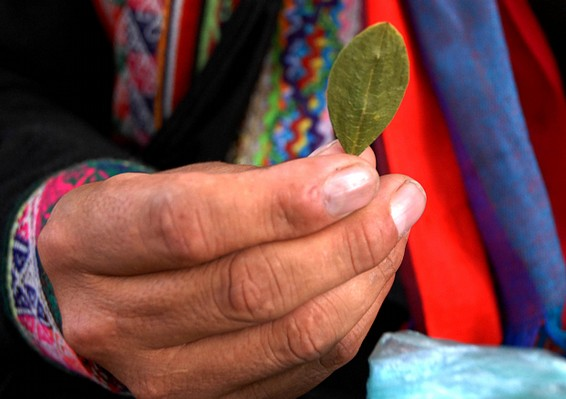
A Bolivian man holding a coca leaf; Morales grew coca and joined a union of cocalero growers

Following military service, Morales returned to his family, who had moved to Bolivia's eastern lowlands. Setting up home in the town of Villa 14 de Septiembre, El Chapare, the family cleared a plot of land in the forest to grow rice, fruit and later coca. The Morales family were part of a wider migration to the region, with many migrants hoping to grow coca, which was rising in price. A traditional medicinal and ritual substance in Andean culture, coca was also sold abroad as the key ingredient in cocaine.

As part of their War on Drugs, the United States encouraged Bolivia's government to eradicate coca to prevent cocaine production. Bolivian soldiers burned coca crops and often beat coca growers who challenged them. A foundational event for Morales' politicisation occurred in 1981, when soldiers accused a campesino (coca grower) of cocaine trafficking and burned him to death. Morales opposed the government's efforts and refused the US$2,500 compensation that they offered for each acre of coca eradicated. The campesinos had an ancestral cultural relationship with coca, did not want to lose their most profitable means of subsistence, and framed the issue as one of national sovereignty; activists regularly proclaimed "Long live coca! Death to the Yankees!" ("Causachun coca! Wañuchun yanquis!").

The El Chapare region remained special to Morales and he often referenced it in later speeches. Here, he learned to speak Quechua, founded a soccer team, and joined a cocalero (coca grower) trade union, being appointed local Secretary of Sports and becoming known for arranging soccer matches during meeting recesses. Becoming increasingly active in the union, from 1982 to 1983, Morales was general secretary of his local San Francisco syndicate; he temporarily retreated from union work following the 1983 death of his father.

=== General Secretary of the Cocalero Union: 1984–1994 ===
From 1984 to 1991, campesinos protested against the forced eradication of coca by marching, forming roadblocks, occupying local government offices, and conducting hunger strikes. Morales was involved in this activism and in 1984 was present at a roadblock where three campesinos were killed. From 1984 to 1985, Morales served as the union's Secretary of Records, in 1985 he became General Secretary of the August Second Headquarters, and in 1988 he was elected Executive Secretary of the Federation of the Tropics. In 1989, he spoke at a one-year commemoration of the Villa Tunari massacre, in which 11 coca farmers had been killed by the Rural Area Mobile Patrol Unit (Unidad Móvil Policial para Áreas Rurales – UMOPAR). The following day, UMOPAR agents beat Morales up. In 1992, Morales made international trips to champion the cocalero cause; while he was visiting Canada he learned of his mother's death.

In his speeches, Morales presented coca as a symbol of Andean culture that was threatened by American imperialism. In his view, the US had no right to eliminate coca, which had many traditional uses. Morales stated: "We produce our coca, we bring it to the main markets, we sell it and that's where our responsibility ends". Morales presented coca growers as victims of a wealthy, urban elite who had bowed to US pressure by implementing neoliberal economic reforms which were detrimental to Bolivia's majority. This situation was exacerbated following the 1993 election of the Revolutionary Nationalist Movement, which implemented a policy of "shock therapy", including economic liberalization and widescale privatization of state-owned assets. This government also relaunched the anti-coca offensive, committing to the destruction of 12,500 acres (5,100 ha) of coca by March 1994 in exchange for US$20 million worth of US aid; Morales said the cocalero movement would oppose this.

In August 1994, Morales was arrested and beaten. Accused of sedition, in jail he began a dry hunger strike to protest his arrest. The following day, 3000 campesinos began a 360 mi (580 km) march from Villa Tunari to La Paz. Morales was freed on 7 September and joined the march. He was again arrested in April 1995 during a sting operation that rounded up attendees of an Andean Council of Coca Producers' meeting that Morales was chairing. Prosecutors accused the group of plotting a coup with the aid of Colombia's FARC and Peru's Shining Path, although no evidence of a coup emerged and Morales was freed within a week.

== Political rise ==
=== ASP, IPSP, and MAS: 1995–1999 ===
From 1989, Morales supported the formation of a political wing to the sindicato movement, although a consensus in favor of its formation only emerged in 1993. In 1995, at the 7th Congress of the Unique Confederation of Rural Laborers of Bolivia, the Assembly for the Sovereignty of the Peoples (Asamblea por la Sobernía de los Pueblos – ASP) was formed as a "political instrument". In 1996, Morales was appointed chair of the Committee of the Six Federations of the Tropics of Cochabamba, a position he retained until 2006. Although Bolivia's National Electoral Court refused to recognize the ASP, citing minor procedural infringements, the ASP circumvented this by running under the banner of the United Left, a coalition of leftist parties. They won landslide victories in local strongholds of the movement, producing 11 mayors and 49 municipal councilors. In the 1997 national elections, they gained four seats in the National Congress; Morales was among them, becoming a representative for El Chapare with 70.1% of the local vote.

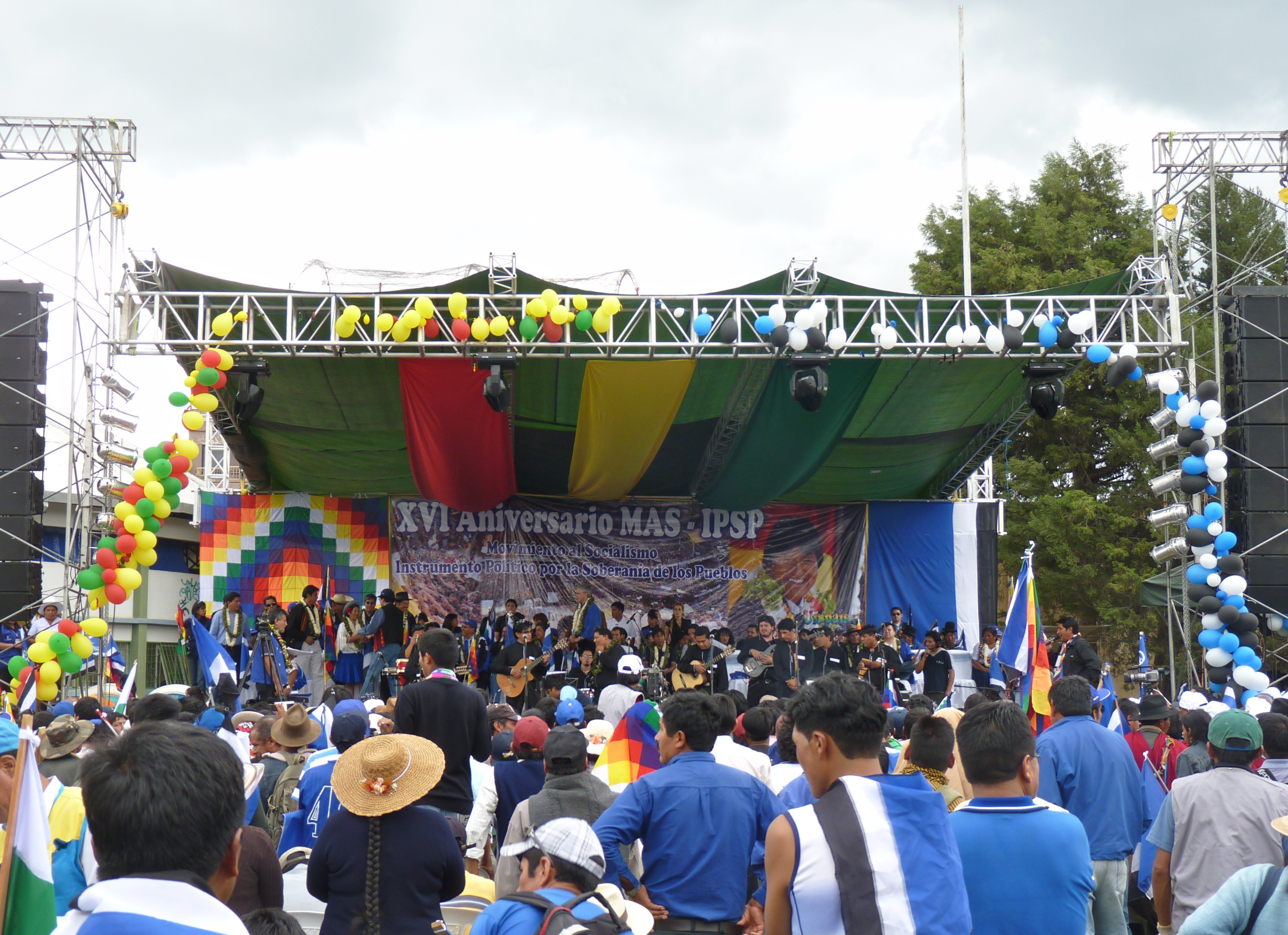
MAS-IPSP supporters celebrate the 16th anniversary of the IPSP party's founding in Sacaba, Cochabamba.

Rising electoral success was accompanied by factional in-fighting, with a leadership contest emerging in the ASP between the incumbent Alejo Véliz and Morales, who had the electoral backing of the social movement's bases. Morales and his supporters then split to form their own party, the Political Instrument for the Sovereignty of the Peoples (Instrumento Político por la Soberanía de los Pueblos – IPSP). The movement's bases defected en masse to the IPSP, leaving the ASP to crumble. Continuing his activism, in 1998 Morales led another cocalero march from El Chapare to la Paz. He came under increased government criticism; they accused him of involvement in the cocaine trade and mocked his manner of speaking and lack of education.

Morales reached an agreement with David Añez Pedraza, the leader of a defunct yet still registered party named the Movement Toward Socialism (MAS). Under this agreement, Morales and the Six Federaciónes took over the party name, with the IPSP merging into the MAS, becoming the Movement Toward Socialism – Political Instrument for the Sovereignty of the Peoples. Morales' MAS would be described as "an indigenous-based political party that calls for the nationalization of industry, legalization of the coca leaf ... and fairer distribution of national resources." The party lacked the finances of the mainstream parties and so relied largely on volunteers to operate. It was not structured like other political parties, instead operating as the political wing of the social movement, with all tiers in the movement involved in decision-making; this form of organisation continued until 2004. In the 1999 municipal elections, MAS secured 79 municipal council seats and 10 mayoral positions, gaining 3.27% of the national vote, although 70% of the vote in Cochabamba.

=== Cochabamba protests: 2000–2002 ===
In 2000, the Tunari Waters corporation doubled the price of water charged to Bolivian consumers. In the resulting backlash, protestors clashed with police and armed forces in what was dubbed "the Water War", resulting in 6 deaths. The government removed the contract from Tunari and placed the utility under cooperative control. In ensuing years violent protests broke out over other issues, much of it resulting from unrest over economic liberalisations that were accused of only benefiting a small minority. Morales did not take a leading role in these protests but used them to convey his message that the MAS was not a cocalero single-issue party but a movement calling for structural change and a redefinition of Bolivian citizenship.

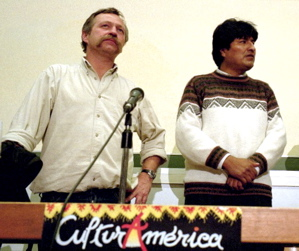
Evo Morales (right) with French labor union leader José Bové in 2002

In 2001, Jorge Quiroga became Bolivia's president. Under U.S. pressure, Quiroga stated that Morales' inflammatory language had caused the deaths of two police officers in Sacaba and that he should be expelled from Congress. 140 deputies voted for Morales' expulsion, which occurred in 2002. Morales called it "a trial against Aymara and Quechas". MAS activists interpreted it as evidence of the pseudo-democratic credentials of the political class.

MAS gained increasing popularity as a protest party, relying largely on widespread dissatisfaction with the mainstream parties in rural and poor urban areas. Recognising this, much of Morales' discourse focused on differentiating MAS from the traditional political class. Statements from Manuel Rocha, U.S. ambassador to Bolivia, that U.S. aid to Bolivia would be cut if MAS won an election also contributed to increased support for Morales. In the 2002 presidential election, MAS gained 20.94% of the national vote, becoming Bolivia's second largest party. MAS also won 8 seats in the Senate and 27 in the Chamber of Deputies. Now the leader of the political opposition, Morales met with Venezuelan President Hugo Chávez for the first time. The U.S. embassy urged other parties to sign a broad agreement to oppose MAS, while Morales alleged that the U.S. Central Intelligence Agency was plotting to assassinate him.

=== Rise to prominence: 2003–2005 ===
In 2003, the Bolivian gas conflict broke out as activists protested the privatisation of the country's natural gas supply and its sale to U.S. companies below market value. Roadblock protests around La Paz led to violent clashes with police, in which 80 were killed. Morales was not actively involved, instead traveling to Libya and Switzerland, where he described the protest as a "peaceful revolution in progress". The government accused MAS of using the protests to overthrow Bolivia's democracy with the aid of organized crime, FARC, and the governments of Venezuela, Cuba, and Libya.

Amid the crisis, President Gonzalo Sánchez de Lozada resigned and was replaced by Carlos Mesa, who tried to strike a balance between U.S. and protestor demands, but whom Morales mistrusted. In November, Morales visited Cuban President Fidel Castro, and then met Argentinian President Nestor Kirchner. In the 2004 municipal election, MAS became the country's largest national party, with 28.6% of all councilors in Bolivia, although their failure to win the mayoralty in any big cities reflected their lack of wide support among the urban middle-classes. In Bolivia's wealthier Santa Cruz region, a strong movement for autonomy developed under the leadership of the Pro Santa Cruz Committee (Comite Pro Santa Cruz). They considered armed insurrection to secede from Bolivia should MAS take power.

==== 2005 election ====
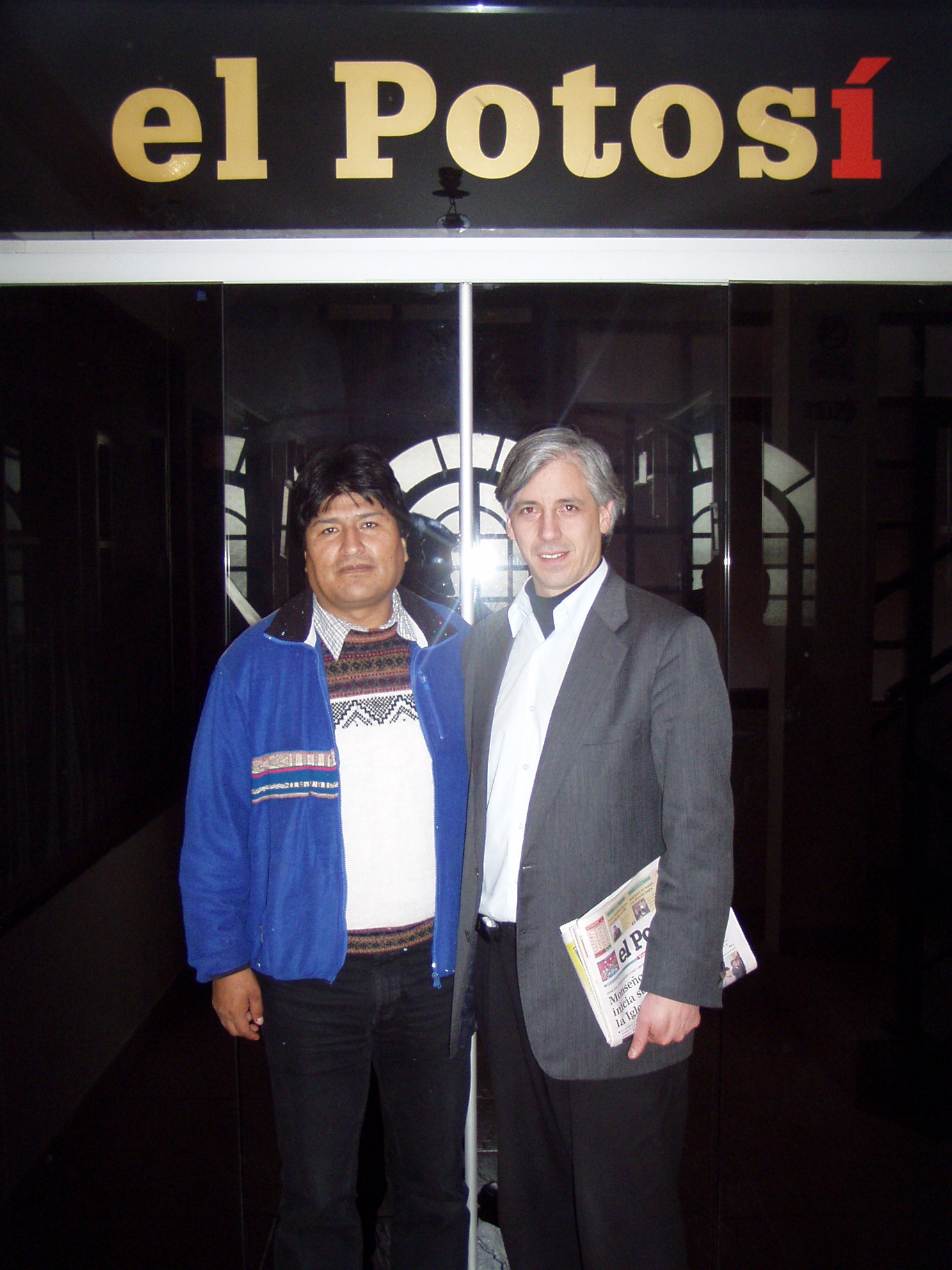
Morales with his vice-presidential running mate, Álvaro García Linera, in 2005

In March 2005, Mesa resigned, citing the pressure of the protests. Amid fears of civil war, Eduardo Rodríguez Veltzé became president of a transitional government, preparing Bolivia for a general election in December. MAS's electoral campaign was based on Salvador Allende's successful campaign in the 1970 Chilean presidential election, with Morales choosing Marxist intellectual Álvaro García Linera as his vice-presidential candidate. Measures were implemented to give the party greater independence from the social movement, thereby moderating its public image and allowing Morales' team to respond quickly to developments without the lengthy process of consulting the social base.

Morales's main opponent was Jorge Quiroga, whose campaign centered in Santa Cruz; Quiroga accused Morales of promoting cocaine and being a puppet for Venezuela. With a turnout of 84.5%, the election saw Morales gain 53.7% of the vote to Quiroga's 28.6%; Morales's was the first victory with an absolute majority in Bolivia for 40 years. It was also the highest national vote percentage of any presidential candidate in South American history. As the sixth self-described leftist president elected in South America since 1998, his victory was identified as part of the broader regional pink tide.

Becoming president-elect, Morales was widely described as Bolivia's first Indigenous American leader, at a time when around 62% of the population identified as indigenous; political analysts drew comparisons with the 1994 election of Nelson Mandela in South Africa. There was much excitement among Indigenous American communities, but Bolivia's wealthier and land-owning classes feared state expropriations of their property. Morales traveled to Cuba, Venezuela, Europe, China, and South Africa, before being crowned Apu Mallku (Supreme Leader) of the Aymara at a January 2006 ceremony in Tiwanaku. There he received gifts from Indigenous peoples across South America and thanked the goddess Pachamama for his victory.

== President (2006–2019) ==
=== First presidential term: 2006–2009 ===
In the world there are large and small countries, rich countries and poor countries, but we are equal in one thing, which is our right to dignity and sovereignty.

— Evo Morales, Inaugural Speech, 22 January 2006.

Morales' inauguration took place on 22 January in La Paz. It was attended by heads of state, including Argentina's Kirchner, Venezuela's Chávez, Brazil's Lula da Silva, and Chile's Ricardo Lagos. Morales wore an Andeanized suit by fashion designer Beatriz Canedo Patiño, and gave a speech that included a minute silence in memory of cocaleros and indigenous activists killed in the struggle. He condemned Bolivia's former "colonial" regimes, likening them to South Africa under apartheid and stating that MAS' election would lead to a "refoundation" of the country.

In taking office, Morales emphasized nationalism, anti-imperialism, and anti-neoliberalism, although did not initially call his administration socialist. He reduced his own presidential wage and that of his ministers by 57% and urged members of Congress to do the same. Morales gathered together a largely inexperienced cabinet made up of indigenous activists and leftist intellectuals, although over the next three years there was a rapid turnover as Morales replaced many of the indigenous members with trained middle-class politicians. By 2012 only 3 of the 20 cabinet members identified as indigenous.

==== Economic program ====
At the time of Morales' election, Bolivia was South America's poorest nation. Morales' government did not fundamentally change Bolivia's economic structure, and their National Development Plan (PDN) for 2006–10 largely retained the existing liberal economic model. Bolivia's economy was based largely on the extraction of natural resources, with the country having South America's second largest natural gas reserves. Keeping to his election pledge, Morales took increasing state control of the hydrocarbon industry with Supreme Decree 2870; previously, corporations paid 18% of their profits to the state, but Morales increased this to 82%. Oil companies threatened to cease operations but ultimately relented. Accordingly, Bolivia's income from hydrocarbon extraction increased from $173 million in 2002 to $1.3 billion by 2006. Although technically not a form of nationalization, Morales' government referred to it as such, resulting in criticism from sectors of the Bolivian left.

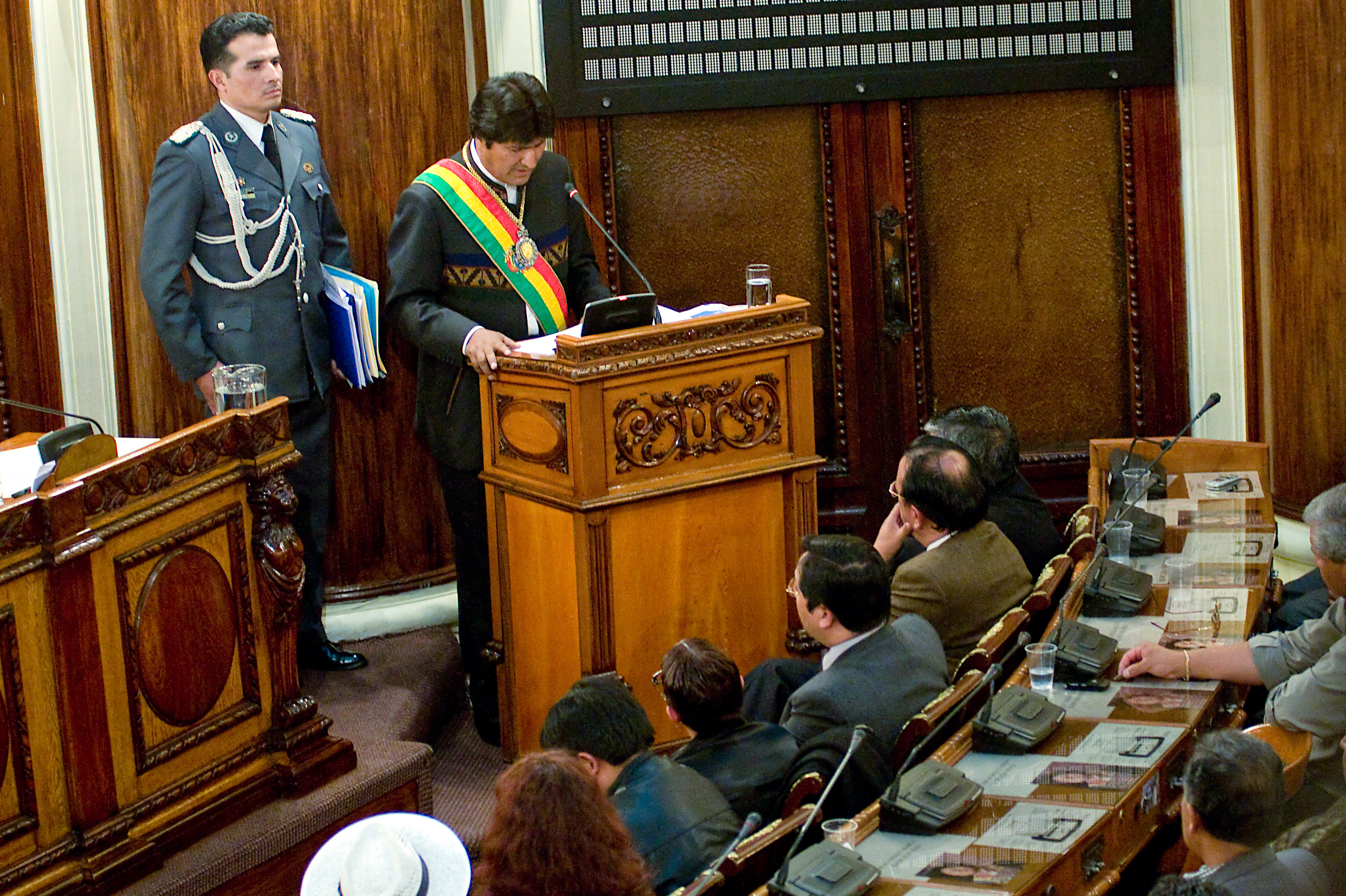
Morales addressing parliament in 2008

In June 2006, Morales announced plans to nationalize mining, electricity, telephones, and railroads. In February 2007, he nationalized the Vinto metallurgy plant and refused to compensate Glencore, which the government said had obtained the contract illegally. Although the FSTMB miners' federation called for nationalization of the mines, the government stated that any transnational corporations operating in Bolivia legally would not be expropriated.

Under Morales, Bolivia experienced an increase in value of its currency, the boliviano. Morales' first year in office ended with no fiscal deficit; the first time this had happened in Bolivia for 30 years. During the 2008 financial crisis, Bolivia maintained one of the world's highest levels of economic growth. This led to a nationwide boom in construction, and allowed the state to build strong financial reserves. Although social spending increased, it remained relatively low, with a priority being the construction of paved roads and community spaces such as soccer fields and union buildings. Focus was placed on rural infrastructure improvement, to bring roads, running water, and electricity to areas without them. The government's stated intention was to reduce Bolivia's most acute poverty levels from 35% to 27% of the population, and moderate poverty levels from 58.9% to 49% over five years. The welfare state was expanded, as characterized by the introduction of non-contributory old-age pensions and payments to mothers provided their babies are taken for health checks and that their children attend school.

During Morales' first term, Bolivia cut ties with the World Bank and International Monetary Fund (IMF). In May 2007, it became the world's first country to withdraw from the International Center for the Settlement of Investment Disputes, with Morales stating that the institution had consistently favored multinational corporations in its judgments. Bolivia's lead was followed by other South American nations. Bolivia refused to join the Free Trade Area of the Americas, deeming it a form of U.S. imperialism.

A major dilemma faced by Morales' administration was between the desire to expand extractive industries to provide employment and fund social programs, and to protect the environment from the pollution caused by those industries. Although his government professed an environmentalist ethos, expanding environmental monitoring and becoming a leader in the voluntary Forest Stewardship Council, Bolivia continued to experience rapid deforestation for agriculture and illegal logging. Both left and right-leaning economists expressed concern over the government's lack of economic diversification. Many Bolivians opined that Morales' government had failed to bring about sufficient job creation.

==== ALBA and international appearances ====
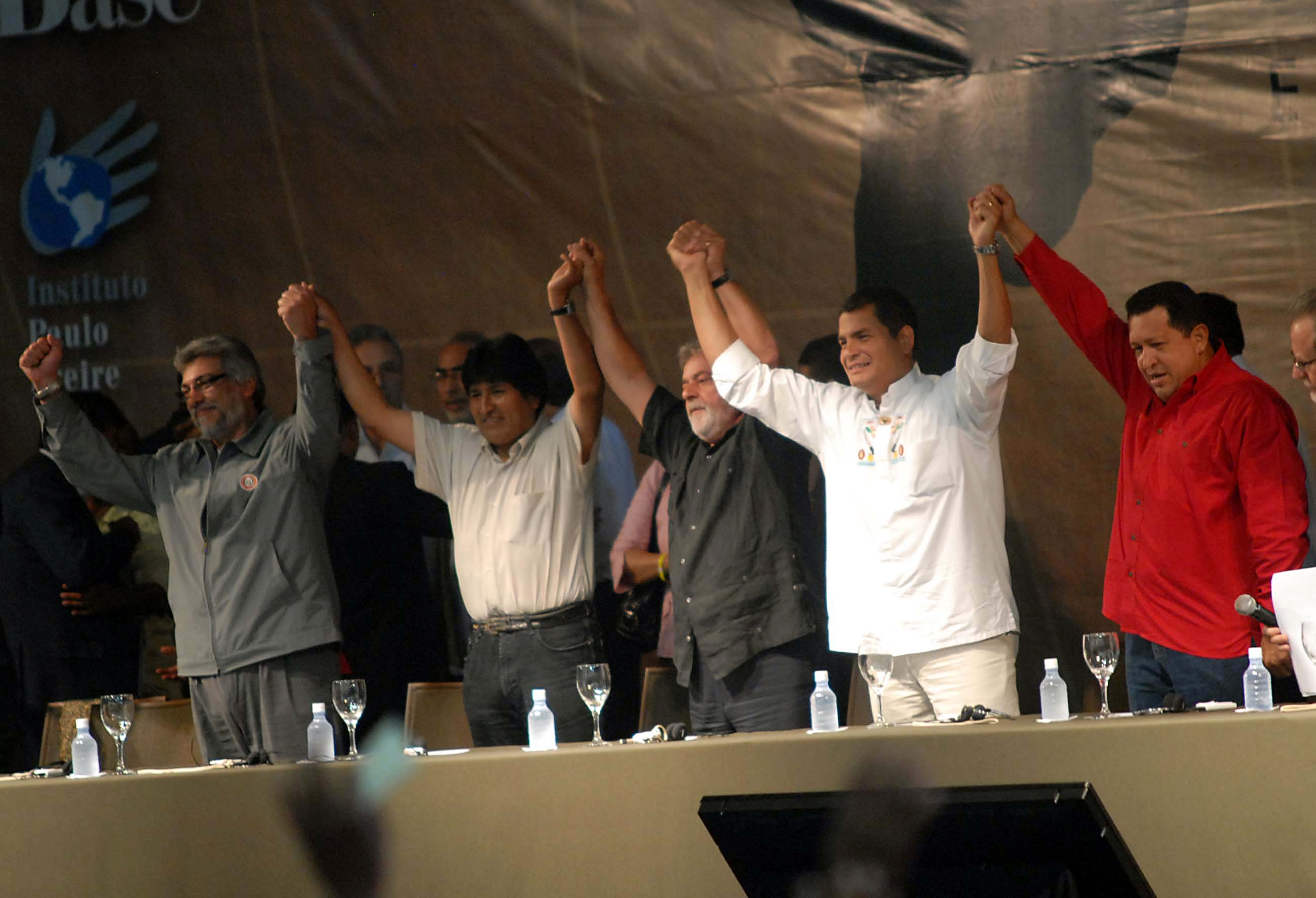
Morales with regional allies, at the Fórum Social Mundial for South America: President of Paraguay Lugo, President of Brasil Lula, President of Ecuador Correa and President of Venezuela Chávez.

Morales' administration sought strong links with Cuba and Venezuela, with Morales meeting with their respective leaders, Castro and Chávez, in Havana in April 2005. In 2006, Bolivia joined Cuba and Venezuela in founding the Bolivarian Alternative for the Americas (ALBA); at ALBA's conference in May, they initiated a Peoples' Trade Agreement (PTA).

Morales also oversaw "the least US-friendly government in Bolivian history". In September Morales visited the U.S. to attend the UN General Assembly, where he gave a speech condemning U.S. President George W. Bush as a terrorist for launching wars in Afghanistan and Iraq and called for the UN Headquarters to be moved out of the country. In the U.S., he met former presidents Bill Clinton and Jimmy Carter and with Native American groups. U.S.-Bolivian relations were further strained in December when Morales issued a Supreme Decree requiring all U.S. citizens visiting Bolivia to have a visa. His government's refusal to grant legal immunity to U.S. soldiers in Bolivia led the U.S. to cut its military support to Bolivia by 96%.

In December 2006, he attended the first South-South conference in Abuja, Nigeria, there meeting Libya's Muammar Gaddafi, whose government had recently awarded Morales the Al-Gaddafi International Prize for Human Rights. Morales proceeded to Havana for a conference celebrating Castro's life, where his speech argued for stronger links between the Americas and the Middle East to combat U.S. imperialism. Under his administration, diplomatic relations were established with Iran, with Morales praising Iranian President Mahmoud Ahmadinejad as a revolutionary comrade. In April 2007 he attended the first South American Energy Summit in Venezuela, arguing with many allies over the issue of biofuel, which he opposed. He had a particularly fierce argument with Brazilian President Lula over Morales' desire to bring Bolivia's refineries – which were largely owned by Brazil's Petrobrás – under state control. In May, Bolivia purchased the refineries and transferred them to the Bolivian State Petroleum Company (YPFB).

==== Social reform ====
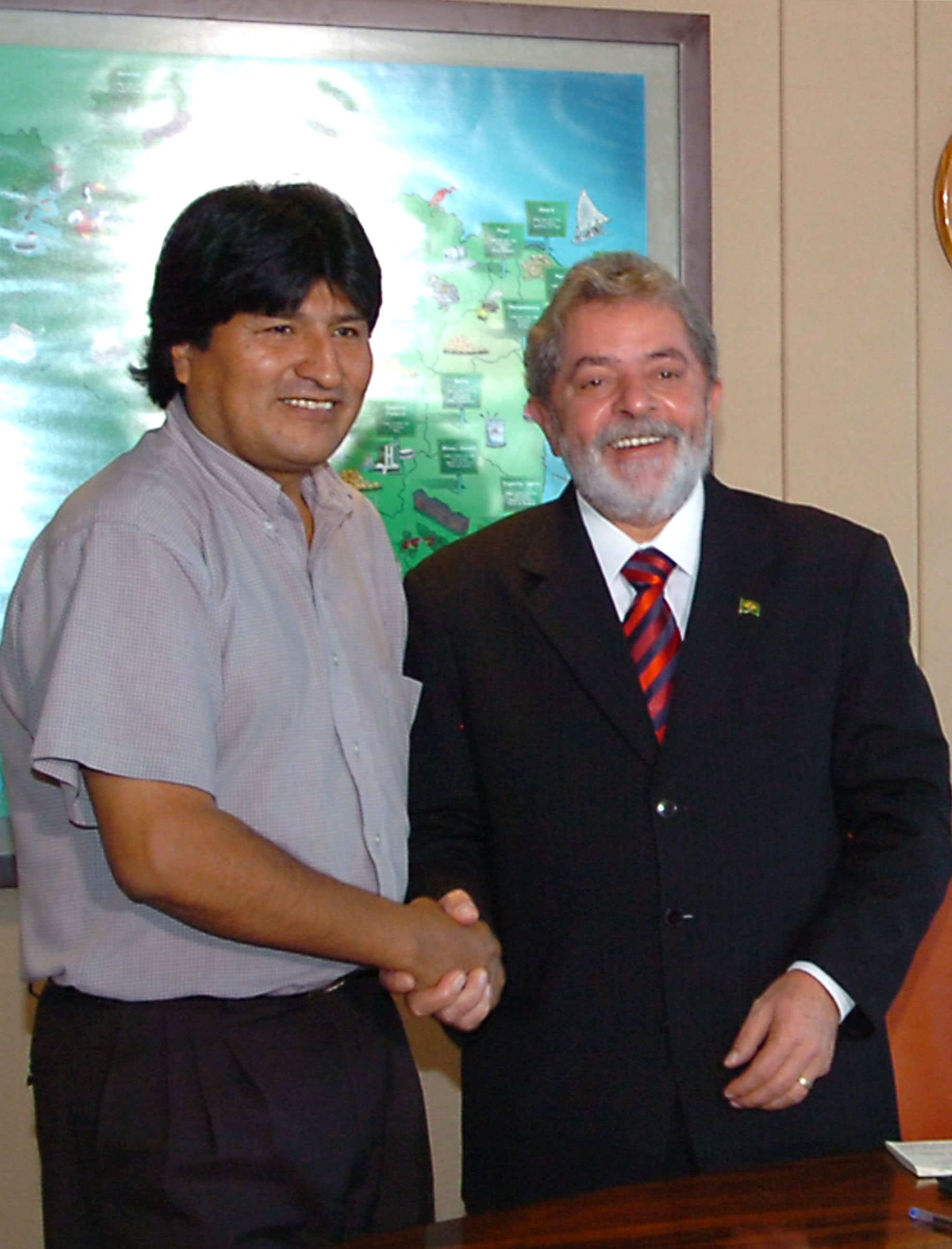
Morales with Brazilian President Lula

Morales' government sought to encourage a model of development based upon the premise of vivir bien, or "to live well". This entailed seeking social harmony, consensus, the elimination of discrimination, and wealth redistribution; in doing so, it was rooted in communal rather than individual values and owed more to indigenous Andean forms of social organization than Western ones.

Upon Morales' election, Bolivia's illiteracy rate was at 16%, the highest in South America. Attempting to rectify this with the aid of left-wing allies, Bolivia launched a literacy campaign with Cuban assistance, and Venezuela invited 5,000 Bolivian high school graduates to study in Venezuela for free. By 2009, UNESCO declared Bolivia free from illiteracy. The World Bank stated that illiteracy had declined by 5%. Cuba also aided Bolivia in the development of its medical care, opening ophthalmological centers in the country to treat 100,000 Bolivians for free per year, and offering 5,000 free scholarships for Bolivian students to study medicine in Cuba. The government sought to expand state medical facilities, opening twenty hospitals by 2014, and increasing basic medical coverage up to the age of 25. Their approach sought to utilize and harmonize both mainstream Western medicine and Bolivia's traditional medicine.

The 2006 Bono Juancito Pinto program provided US$29 per year to parents who kept their children in public school with an attendance rate above 80%. 2008's Renta Dignidad initiative expanded the previous Bonosol social security for seniors program, increasing payments to $344 per year, and lowering the eligibility age from 65 to 60. 2009's Bono Juana Azurduy program expanded a previous public maternity insurance, giving cash to low-income mothers who proved that they and their baby had received pre- and post-natal medical care, and gave birth in an authorized medical facility. Conservative critics of Morales' government said that these measures were designed to buy off the poor and ensure continued support for the government, particularly the Bono Juancito Pinto which is distributed very close to election day.

Morales announced that one of the top priorities of his government was to eliminate racism against the country's indigenous population. To do this, he announced that all civil servants were required to learn one of Bolivia's three indigenous languages, Quechua, Aymara, or Guaraní, within two years. His government encouraged the development of indigenous cultural projects, and sought to encourage more indigenous people to attend university; by 2008, it was estimated that half of the students enrolled in Bolivia's 11 public universities were indigenous, while three indigenous-specific universities had been established, offering subsidized education. In 2009, a Vice Ministry for Decolonization was established, which proceeded to pass the 2010 Law against Racism and Discrimination banning the espousal of racist views in private or public institutions. Various commentators noted that there was a renewed sense of pride among the country's indigenous population following Morales' election. Conversely, the opposition accused Morales' administration of aggravating racial tensions between indigenous, white, and mestizo populations, and of using the Racism and Discrimination law to attack freedom of the press.

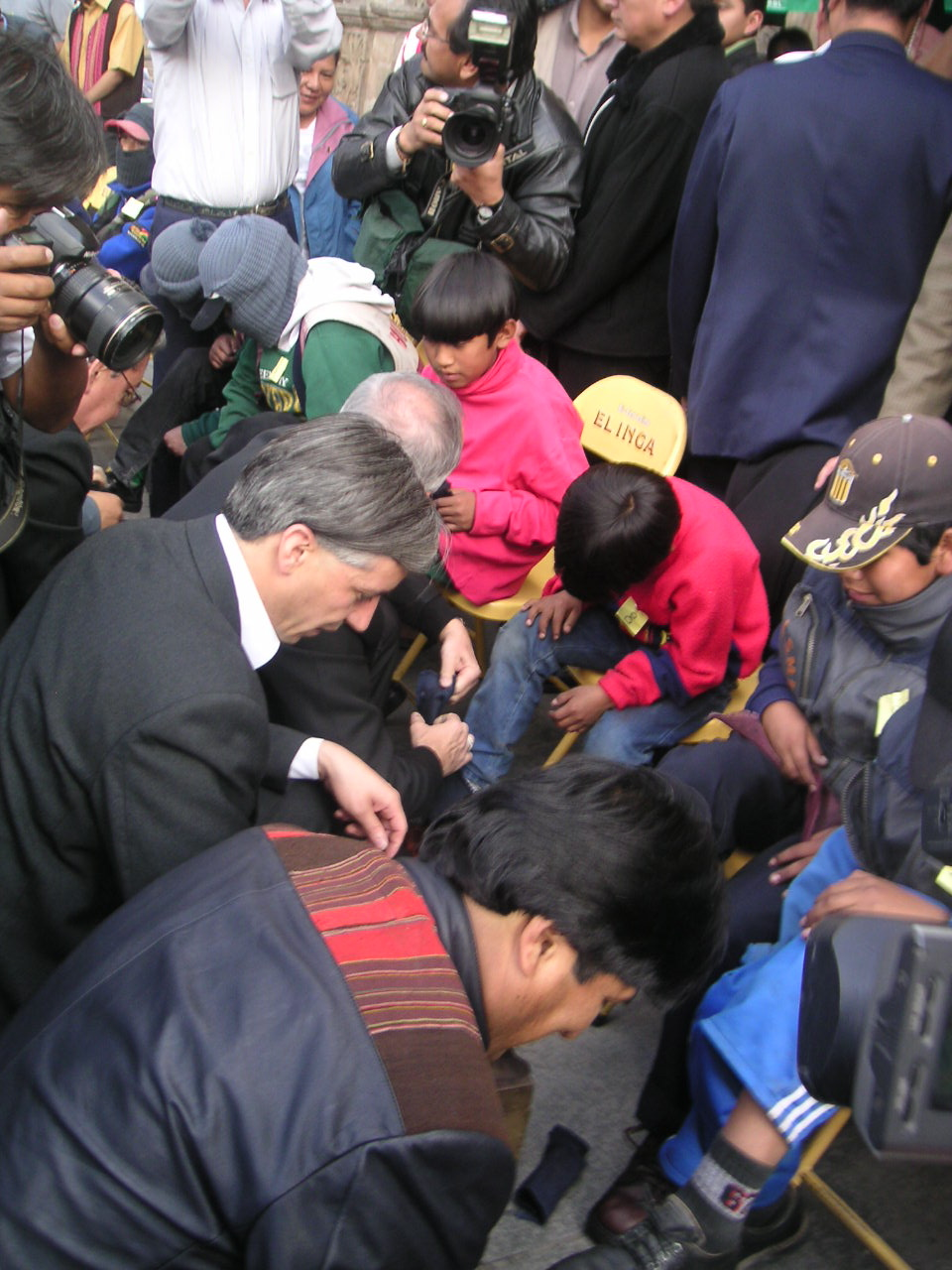
Morales and Vice President Álvaro García Linera in 2006 shining the shoes of shoeshine boys.

On International Workers' Day 2006, Morales issued a presidential decree undoing aspects of the informalization of labor which had been implemented by previous neoliberal governments; this was seen as a highly symbolic act for labor rights in Bolivia. In 2009 his government put forward suggested reforms to the 1939 labor laws, although lengthy discussions with trade unions hampered the reforms' progress. Morales' government increased the legal minimum wage by 50%, and reduced the pension age from 65 to 60, and then in 2010 reduced it again to 58.

While policies were brought in to improve the living conditions of the working classes, conversely many middle-class Bolivians felt that they had seen their social standing decline, with Morales personally mistrusting the middle-classes, deeming them fickle. A 2006 law reallocated state-owned lands, with this agrarian reform entailing distributing land to traditional communities rather than individuals. In 2010, a law was introduced permitting the formation of recognized indigenous territories, although the implementation of this was hampered by bureaucracy and contesting claims over ownership. Morales' government also sought to improve women's rights in Bolivia. In 2010, it founded a Unit of Depatriarchalization to oversee this process. Further seeking to provide legal recognition and support to LGBT rights, it declared 28 June to be Sexual Minority Rights Day in the country, and encouraged the establishment of a gay-themed television show on the state channel.

Adopting a policy known as "Coca Yes, Cocaine No", Morales' administration ensured the legality of coca growing, and introduced measures to regulate the production and trade of the crop. In 2007, they announced that they would permit the growing of 50,000 acres of coca in the country, primarily for the purposes of domestic consumption, with each family being restricted to the growing of one cato (1600 meters squared) of coca.

A social control program was implemented whereby local unions took on responsibility for ensuring that this quota was not exceeded; in doing so, they hoped to remove the need for military and police intervention, and thus stem the violence of previous decades. Measures were implemented to ensure the industrialization of coca production, with Morales inaugurating the first coca industrialization plant in Chulumani, which produced and packaged coca and trimate tea; the project was primarily funded through a $125,000 donation from Venezuela under the PTA scheme.

These industrialization measures proved largely unsuccessful given that coca remained illegal in most nations outside Bolivia, thus depriving the growers of an international market. Campaigning against this, in 2012 Bolivia withdrew from the UN 1961 Convention which had called for global criminalisation of coca, and in 2013 successfully convinced the UN Single Convention on Narcotic Drugs to declassify coca as a narcotic. The U.S. State Department criticized Bolivia, saying that it was regressing in its counter-narcotics efforts, and dramatically reduced aid to Bolivia to $34 million to fight the narcotics trade in 2007. Nevertheless, the number of cocaine seizures in Bolivia increased under Morales' government, as they sought to encourage coca growers to report and oppose cocaine producers and traffickers. High levels of police corruption surrounding the illicit trade in cocaine remained a continuing problem for Bolivia.

Morales' government also introduced measures to tackle Bolivia's endemic corruption; in 2007, Morales issued a presidential decree to create the Ministry of Institutional Transparency and Fight Against Corruption. Critics said that MAS members were rarely prosecuted for the crime, the main exception being YPFB head Santos Ramírez, who was sentenced to twelve years imprisonment for corruption in 2008. A 2009 law that permitted the retroactive prosecution for corruption led to legal cases being brought against a number of opposition politicians for alleged corruption in the pre-Morales period and many fled abroad to avoid standing trial.

==== Domestic unrest and the new constitution ====
During his presidential campaign, Morales had supported calls for regional autonomy for Bolivia's departments. As president, he changed his position, viewing the calls for autonomy – which came from Bolivia's four eastern departments of Santa Cruz, Beni, Pando, and Tarija – as an attempt by the wealthy bourgeoisie living in these regions to preserve their economic position. He nevertheless agreed to a referendum on regional autonomy, held in July 2006; the four eastern departments voted in favor of autonomy, but Bolivia as a whole voted against it by 57.6%. In September, autonomy activists launched strikes and blockades across eastern Bolivia, resulting in violent clashes with MAS activists. In January 2007, clashes in Cochabamba between activist groups led to fatalities, with Morales' government sending in troops to maintain the peace. The left-indigenous activists formed a Revolutionary Departmental Government, but Morales denounced it as illegal and continued to recognize the legitimacy of right-wing departmental head Manfred Reyes Villa.

In July 2006, an election to form a Constitutional Assembly was held, which saw the highest ever electoral turnout in the nation's history. MAS won 137 of its 255 seats, after which the Assembly was inaugurated in August. The Assembly was the first elected parliamentary body in Bolivia which features strong campesino and indigenous representation. In November, the Assembly approved a new constitution, which converted the Republic of Bolivia into the Plurinational State of Bolivia, describing it as a "plurinational communal and social unified state". The constitution emphasized Bolivian sovereignty of natural resources, separated church and state, forbade foreign military bases in the country, implemented a two-term limit for the presidency, and permitted limited regional autonomy. It also enshrined every Bolivians' right to water, food, free health care, education, and housing. In enshrining the concept of plurinationalism, one commentator noted that it suggested "a profound reconfiguration of the state itself" by recognising the rights to self-determination of various nations within a single state.

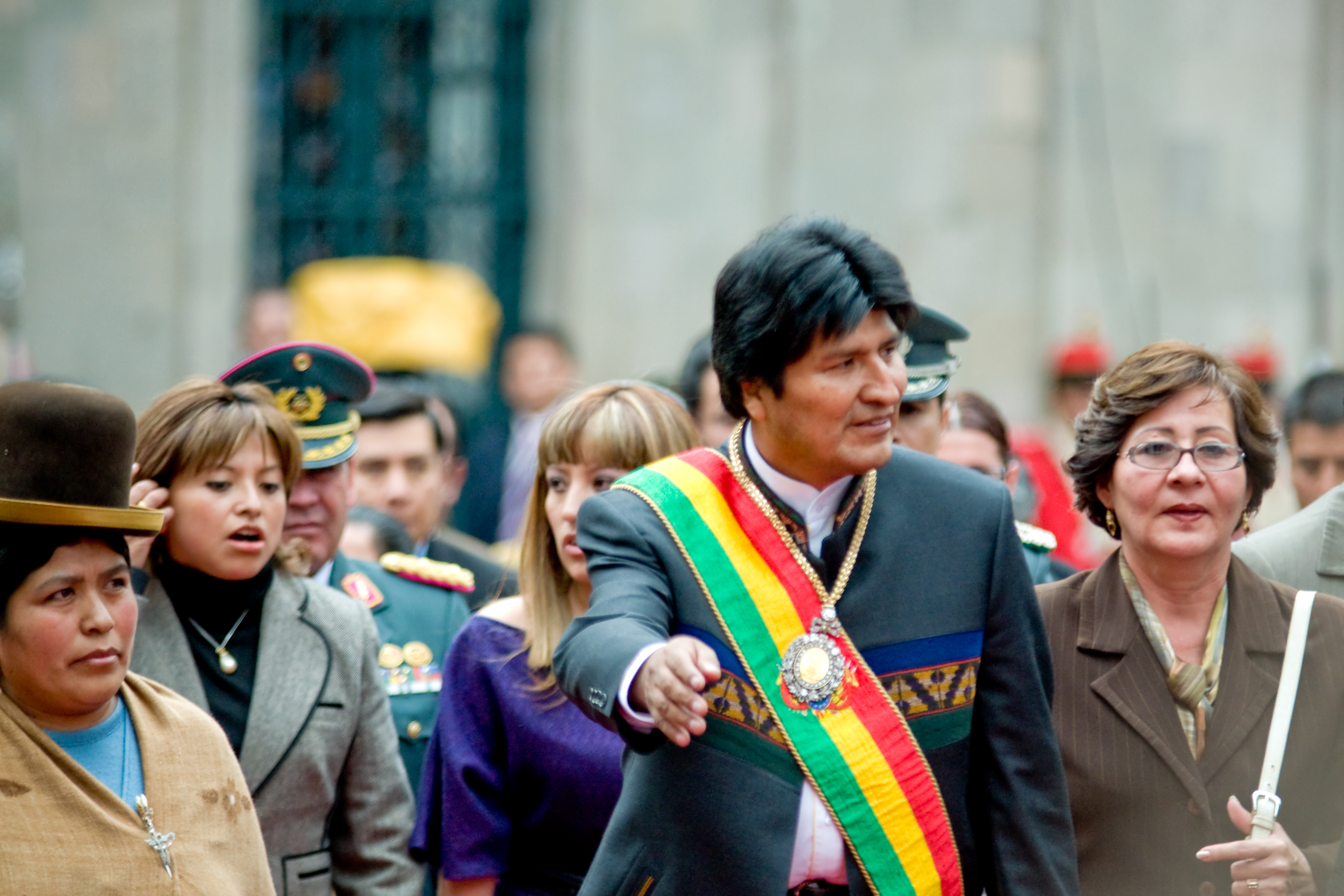
Morales in 2008

In May 2008, the eastern departments pushed for greater autonomy, but Morales' government rejected the legitimacy of their position. They called for a referendum on recalling Morales, which saw an 83% turnout and in which Morales was ratified with 67.4% of the vote. Unified as the National Council for Democracy (CONALDE), these groups – financed by the wealthy agro-industrialist, petroleum, and financial elite – embarked on a series of destabilisation campaigns to unseat Morales' government. Unrest then broke out across eastern Bolivia, as radicalized autonomist activists established blockades, occupied airports, clashing with pro-government demonstrations, police, and armed forces. Some formed paramilitaries, bombing state companies, indigenous NGOs, and human rights organizations, also launching armed racist attacks on indigenous communities, culminating in the Pando Massacre of MAS activists. The autonomists gained support from some high-ranking politicians; Santa Cruz Governor Rubén Costas lambasted Morales and his supporters with racist epithets, accusing the president of being an Aymara fundamentalist and a totalitarian dictator responsible for state terrorism. Amid the unrest, foreign commentators began speculating on the possibility of civil war.

After it was revealed that USAID's Office of Transition Initiatives had supplied $4.5 million to the pro-autonomist departmental governments of the eastern provinces, in September 2008 Morales accused the U.S. ambassador to Bolivia, Philip Goldberg, of "conspiring against democracy" and encouraging the civil unrest, ordering him to leave the country. The U.S. government responded by expelling Bolivian ambassador to the U.S., Gustavo Guzman. Bolivia subsequently expelled the U.S. Drug Enforcement Administration (DEA) from the country, while the U.S. responded by withdrawing their Peace Corps. Chávez stood in solidarity with Bolivia by ordering the U.S. ambassador Patrick Duddy out of his country and withdrawing the Venezuelan ambassador to the U.S. The Union of South American Nations (UNASUR) convened a special meeting to discuss the Bolivian situation, expressing full support for Morales' government.

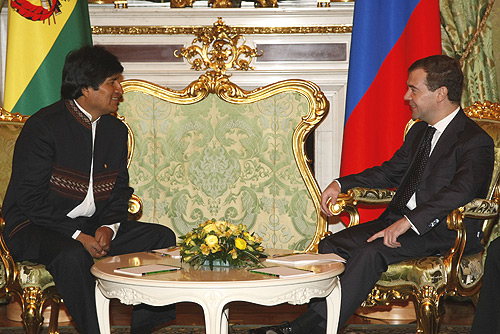
Morales meeting with Russian President Dmitry Medvedev in 2009

Although unable to quell the autonomist violence, Morales' government refused to declare a state of emergency, believing that the autonomists were attempting to provoke them into doing so. Instead, they decided to compromise, entering into talks with the parliamentary opposition. As a result, 100 of the 411 elements of the Constitution were changed, with both sides compromising on certain issues. Nevertheless, the governors of the eastern provinces rejected the changes, believing it gave them insufficient autonomy, while various Indianist and leftist members of MAS felt that the amendments conceded too much to the political right. The constitution was put to a referendum in January 2009, in which it was approved by 61.4% of voters.

Following the approval of the new Constitution, the 2009 general election was called. The opposition sought to delay the election by demanding a new biometric registry system, hoping that it would give them time to form a united front against MAS. Many MAS activists reacted violently against the demands and attempting to prevent this. Morales went on a five-day hunger strike in April 2009 to push the opposition to rescind their demands. He also agreed to allow for the introduction of a new voter registry but said that it was rushed through so as not to delay the election. Morales and the MAS won with a landslide majority, polling 64.2%, while voter participation had reached an all-time high of 90%. His primary opponent, Reyes Villa, gained 27% of the vote. The MAS won a two-thirds majority in both the Chamber of Deputies and the Senate. Morales notably increased his support in the east of the country, with MAS gaining a majority in Tarija. In response to his victory, Morales proclaimed that he was "obligated to accelerate the pace of change and deepen socialism" in Bolivia, seeing his re-election as a mandate to further his reforms.

=== Second presidential term: 2009–2014 ===
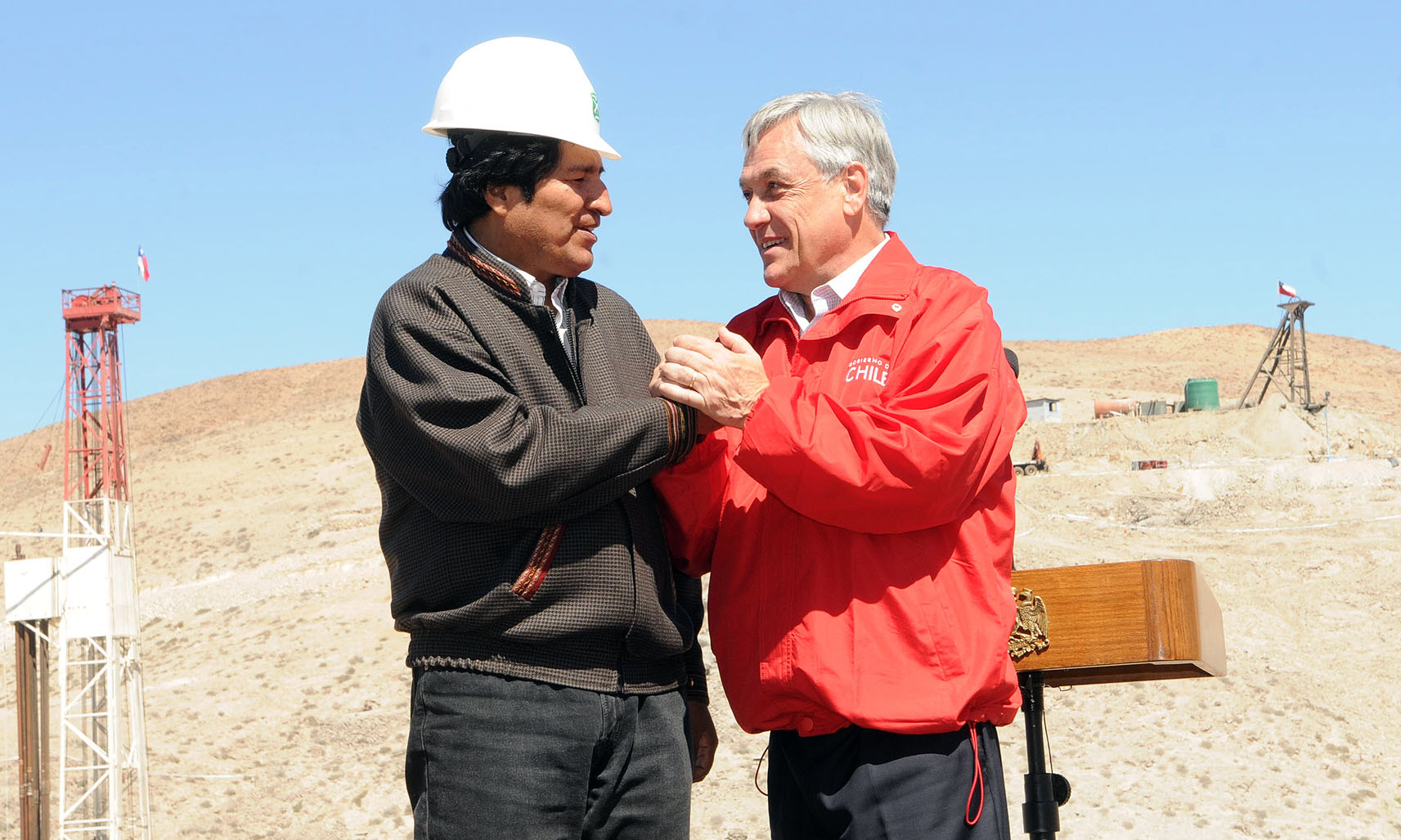
President Morales with president of Chile Sebastián Piñera at the gold-copper mine San José during the Chilean mining accident and the rescue of 33 miners in 2010, who were trapped for more than two months more than 2,000 feet below the surface.

In his second term, Morales began to speak openly of "communitarian socialism" as a guiding ideology. His new cabinet was 50% female, a first for Bolivia, although by 2012, that had dropped to a third. One of the government's main tasks during this term was the introduction of legislation that would cement the rights featured in the new constitution. In April 2010, the departmental elections saw further gains for MAS. In 2013, the government passed a law to combat domestic violence against women.

In December 2009, Morales attended the 2009 United Nations Climate Change Conference in Copenhagen, where he blamed climate change on capitalism and called for a financial transactions tax to fund climate change mitigation. Deeming the conference a failure, he oversaw the World's People Conference on Climate Change and the Rights of Mother Earth outside of Cochabamba in April 2010. In October 2012, the government passed a "Law of Mother Earth" that banned the growth of genetically modified organisms (GMOs) in Bolivia. This was praised by environmentalists and criticized by the nation's soya growers, who said that it would make them less competitive on the global market.

Following Barack Obama's victory in the 2008 U.S. presidential election, U.S.-Bolivian relations improved slightly and in November 2009 the countries entered negotiations to restore diplomatic relations. After the U.S. backed the 2011 military intervention in Libya by NATO forces, Morales condemned Obama and called for his Nobel Peace Prize to be revoked. The two nations restored diplomatic relations in November 2011, although Morales refused to allow the DEA back into the country. Responding to the 2014 Israel–Gaza conflict, Morales called Israel a "terrorist state".

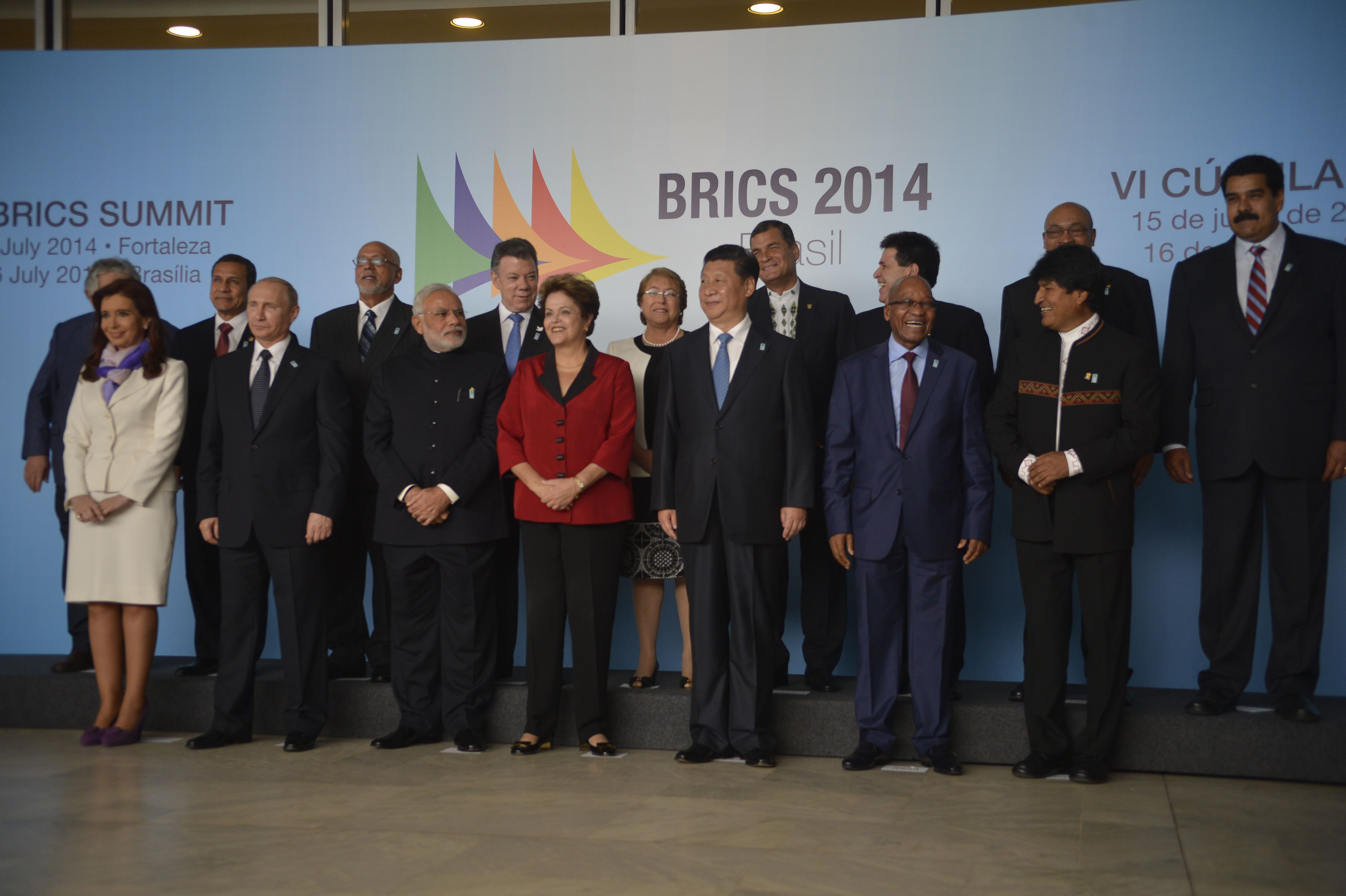
Morales attending the 6th BRICS summit 2014

In July 2013, Morales attended a Moscow summit but, on returning to Bolivia, his presidential plane was forced to land in Austria when Portuguese, French, Spanish and Italian authorities denied it access to their airspace. Bolivian Foreign Minister David Choquehuanca said the European states had acted on "unfounded suspicions" that whistleblower Edward Snowden was aboard. The Organisation of American States condemned "actions that violate the basic rules and principles of international law such as the inviolability of Heads of State", and demanded that the European governments explain their actions and apologise. An emergency meeting of the Union of South American Nations denounced "the flagrant violation of international treaties" by European powers. South American leaders describe the incident as a "stunning violation of national sovereignty and disrespect for the region". Morales described the incident as a "hostage" situation. France apologised the next day.

In 2014, Morales became the oldest active professional soccer player in the world after signing a contract for $200 a month with Sport Boys Warnes.

==== Domestic protests ====
Morales' second term was impacted by dissent and protest within his support base. In May 2010, his government announced a 5% rise in the minimum wage. The Bolivian Workers' Central (COB) felt this insufficient and called a general strike, while protesters clashed with police. The government refused to increase the rise, accusing protesters of being pawns of the right. In August 2010, violent protests broke out in southern Potosí over widespread unemployment and a lack of infrastructure investment. In December 2010, the government cut subsidies for gasoline and diesel fuels, which raised fuel prices and transport costs. Protests led Morales to nullify the decree, responding that he "ruled by obeying". In June 2012, Bolivia's police launched protests against anti-corruption reforms to the police service and demanded salary increases. Morales' government relented, canceling many of the proposed reforms and agreeing to the wage rise.

In 2011, the government signed a contract with a Brazilian company to construct a highway between Beni and Cochabamba, which would pass through the Isiboro Sécure National Park and Indigenous Territory (TIPNIS). This would better integrate the Beni and Pando departments with the rest of Bolivia and facilitate hydrocarbons exploration. The plan brought condemnation from environmentalists and indigenous communities living in the TIPNIS, who said it would encourage deforestation and illegal settlement and that it violated the constitution and United Nations Declaration on the Rights of Indigenous Peoples. The issue became an international cause célèbre and cast doubt on the government's environmentalist and indigenous rights credentials.

In August, 800 protesters embarked on a protest march from Trinidad to La Paz; many were injured in clashes with police and supporters of the road. Two government ministers and other high-ranking officials resigned in protest and Morales' government announced suspension of the road. In October 2011, Morales passed Law 180, prohibiting further road construction, although the government proceeded with a consultation, eventually gaining the consent of 55 of the 65 communities in TIPNIS to allow the highway to be built, albeit with concessions. In May 2013, the government announced that it would permit hydrocarbon exploration in Bolivia's 22 national parks, to widespread condemnation from environmentalists.

=== Third presidential term: 2014–2019 ===
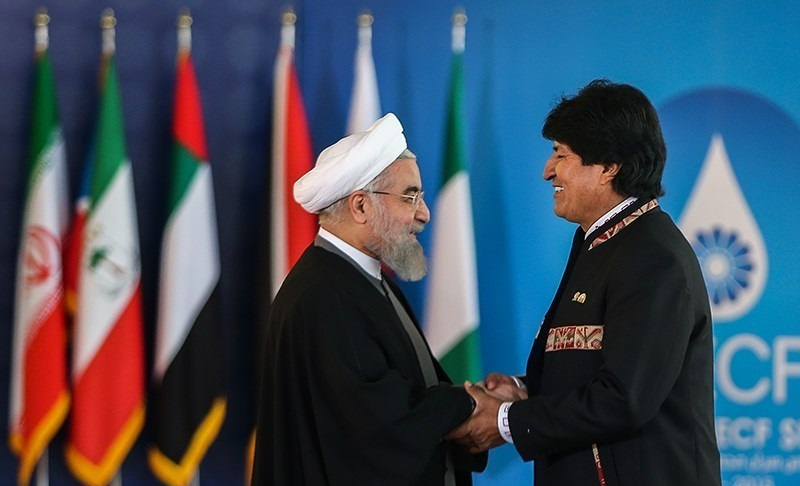
Morales with Iranian President Hassan Rouhani during the Third GECF summit.

In 2008, Morales stated that he would not stand in the 2014 general election, and the 2009 constitution placed a term limit of two consecutive presidential terms. However, a 2013 ruling by the Plurinational Constitutional Court held that Morales' first term did not count towards the term limit because it occurred before the new constitution's ratification, allowing Morales to run for a third term as president. After standing for re-election and proclaiming victory, Morales declared it "a triumph of the anti-colonialists and anti-imperialists" and dedicated his win to both Castro and Chávez.

In early February 2016 there were rumors that Morales had had a child with a young woman, Gabriela Zapata Montaño, and had granted favors to the Chinese company that she worked for. Morales said that they had had a son who died in infancy, but that he had not granted any favors and had not been in contact with Zapata Montaño since 2007. The commission that investigated the issue concluded that Morales was not at fault. Zapata Montaño was later sentenced to ten years in prison for illegal financial behavior.

In July 2018, Morales underwent emergency surgery to remove a tumor. Morales attended the swearing-in ceremony of Venezuela's president Nicolás Maduro for his second term on 10 January 2019. In April 2019, Morales condemned the arrest of WikiLeaks founder Julian Assange.

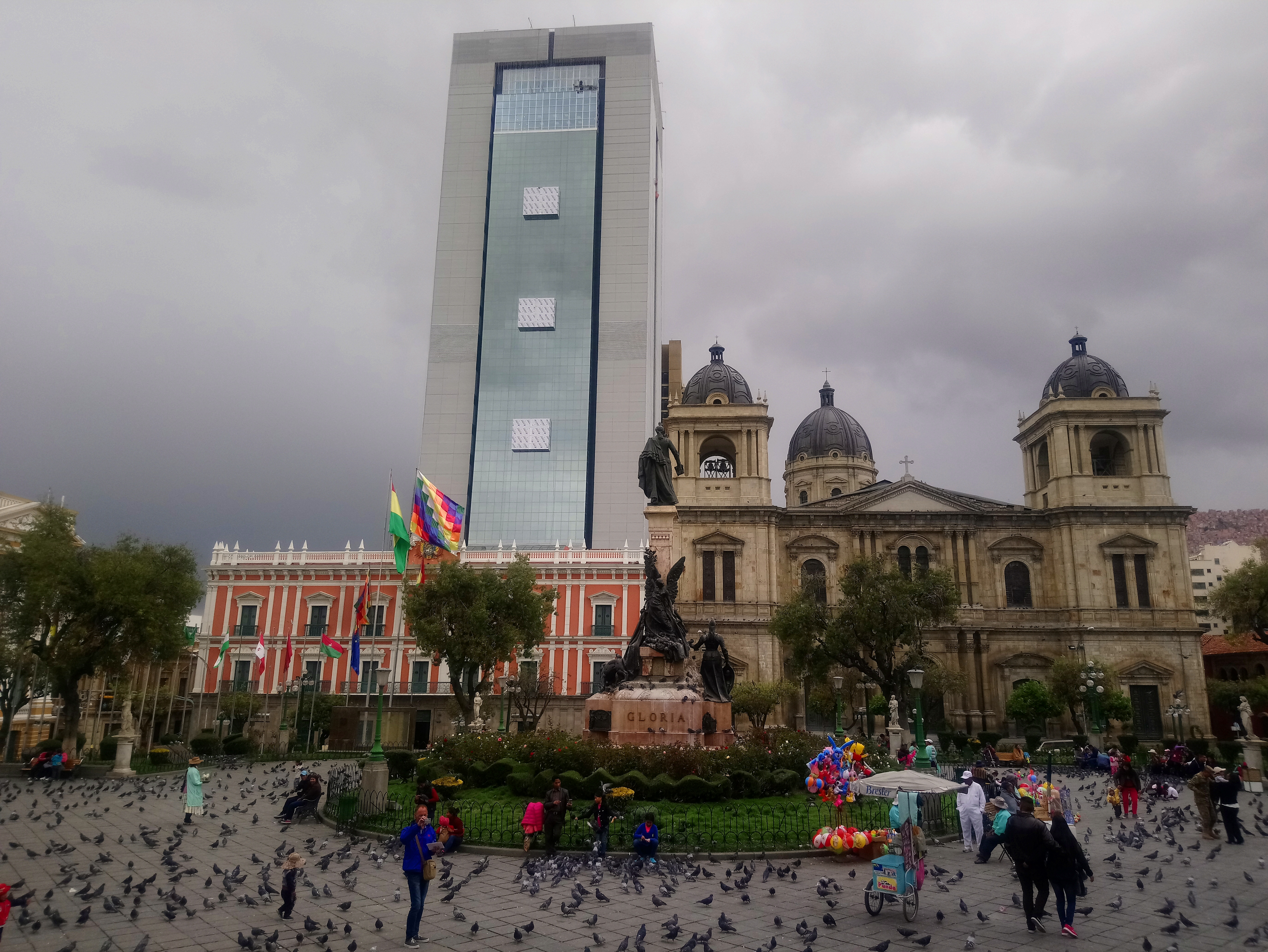
The new Casa Grande del Pueblo presidential offices built by Morales in 2018

In Morales' third term, a new $34 million presidential skyscraper office and residence, the Casa Grande del Pueblo, was constructed in the historical Plaza Murillo. The skyscraper was built to replace the former presidential palace, which Morales planned to turn into a museum. The building features a helipad and the top two floors were reserved for the president, featuring a gym, spa, Jacuzzi and private elevator. The proposal was initially declined due to municipal height restrictions in the historical district, though the Plurinational Legislative Assembly overrode the ban. The Casa Grande del Pueblo was inaugurated by Morales in August 2018. Many analysts and opposition politicians criticised the spending due to Bolivia's high levels of poverty. Morales stated that it was "not a luxury" since it would also house offices for different ministries, cabinet meeting rooms, a center for indigenous ceremonies and a 1,000-seat auditorium.

==== 2019 election controversy and resignation ====
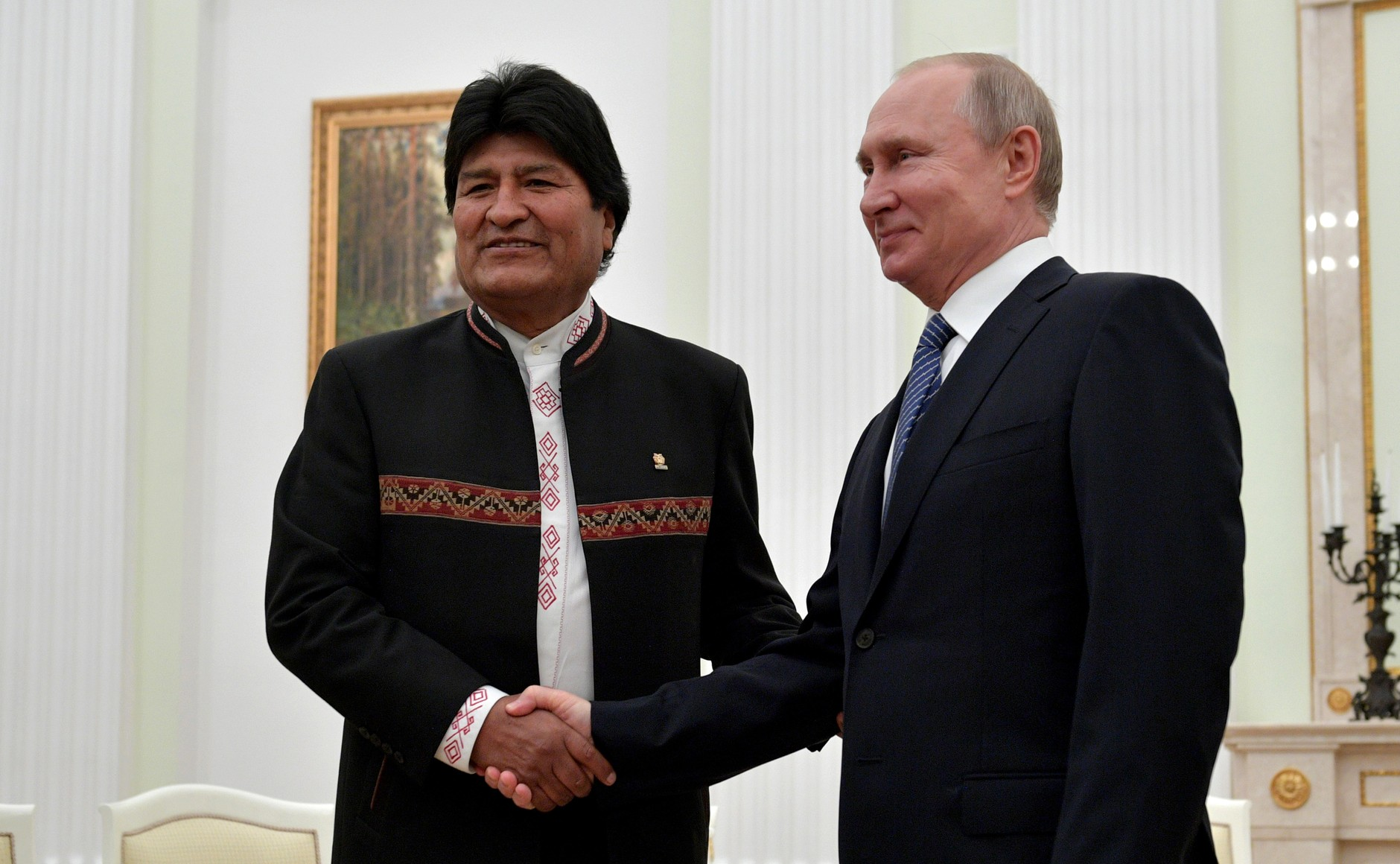
Evo Morales meeting with Russian President Vladimir Putin in 2019

Contradicting earlier claims he had made, Morales began exploring means of making a fourth term possible. The MAS-controlled Plurinational Legislative Assembly organised a 2016 constitutional referendum on allowing three consecutive presidential terms. In the referendum, the proposed amendment narrowly lost. In December 2016, MAS still nominated Morales as their candidate for the 2019 presidential election, stating that they would seek other avenues to ensure the legality of his candidacy. In September 2017, MAS petitioned the Plurinational Constitutional Court to abolish term limits, arguing that term limits are a human rights violations under the American Convention on Human Rights (ACHR), a binding multilateral treaty. In November, the Court accepted the grounds of the petition, enabling Morales to run. Critics said that both courts had been stacked with Morales loyalists.

In October 2019, a general election was held. Concerns of electoral fraud arose after the suspension of the preliminary vote count, in which Morales was not leading by a large enough margin (10%) to avoid an automatic runoff, and the subsequent publication of the official count, according to which he won by just over 10%. The final count, released on 25 October 2019, gave Morales 47.08% of the votes, with 36.51% for runner-up Carlos Mesa. Responding to concerns about vote tampering, Morales asked the Organization of American States (OAS) to audit of the vote count. Morales said he would call for a second-round runoff vote with Mesa if the OAS' audit found evidence of fraud. The OAS audit found "deliberate" and "malicious" attempts to rig the election in favor of Morales. Certain later evaluations contested the reliability of the OAS audit.

=== Resignation and political asylum ===
Morales resigned as president on 10 November 2019; he called his removal "forced" and a "coup" but also said that he wanted to stop bloodshed. He made the announcement from El Chapare, where he had sought refuge. Mexico immediately offered him political asylum; on 11 November, a Mexican government plane flew Morales to Mexico.

== Post-presidency (2019–present) ==
=== Exile and return to Bolivia ===
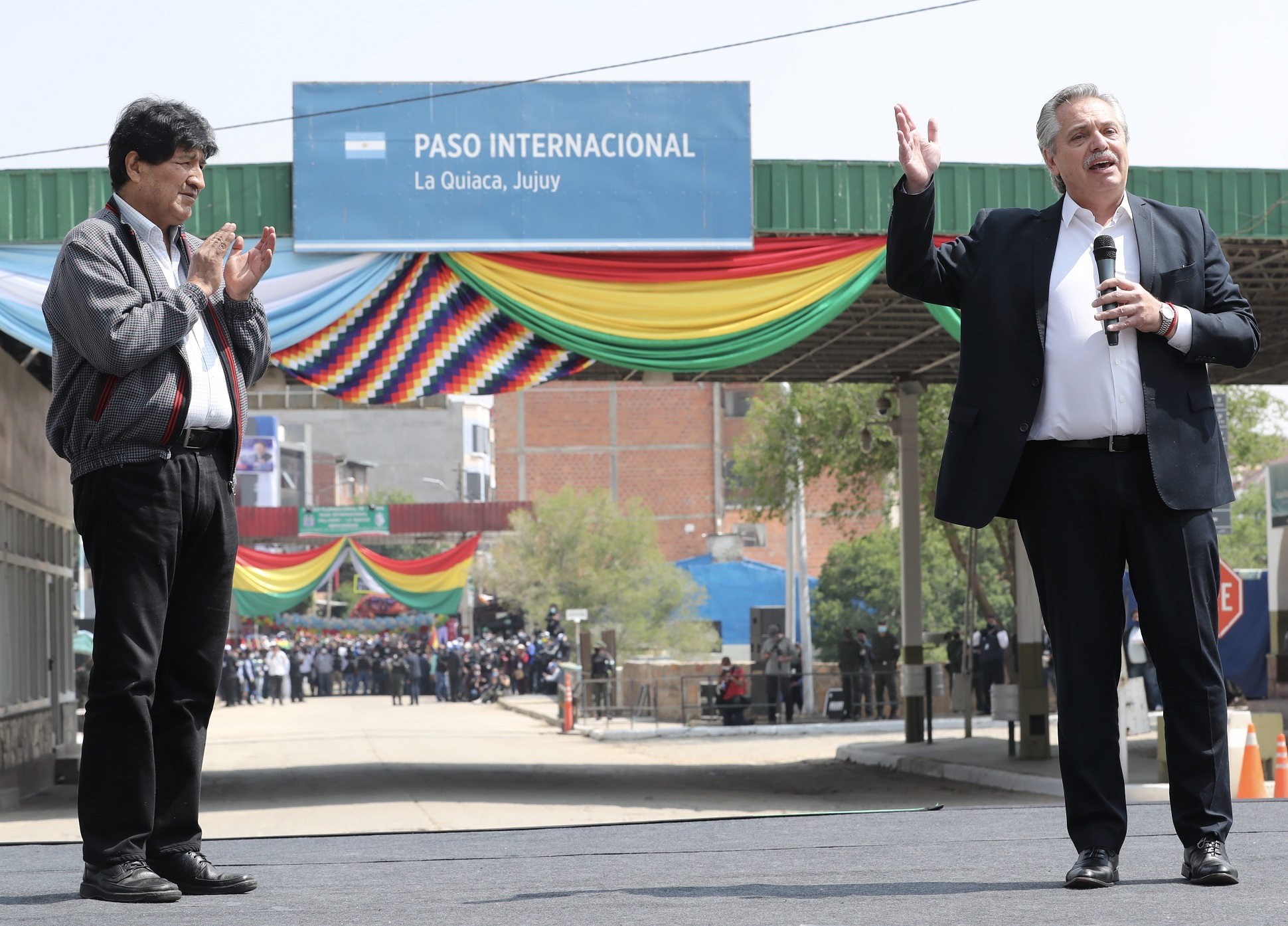
Morales with Argentine president Alberto Fernández in the Argentinian border town of La Quiaca (close to Bolivia's Villazón) in November 2020. Morales returned to Bolivia shortly thereafter.

In December, Morales moved to Argentina, where he was also granted asylum. That month, Bolivian prosecutors issued an arrest warrant for him, alleging that he promoted violent clashes before and after he left office, and that this constituted sedition and terrorism. Human Rights Watch reported that it found no evidence that Morales committed acts of terrorism and described the charges as politically motivated. In October 2020, the charges were dropped and the arrest warrant dismissed when a La Paz court found Morales' rights had been violated and judicial procedures breached.

Following the 2020 general election, MAS candidate Luis Arce became Bolivia's president; on 9 November, Morales returned to Bolivia. Early decisions made by the Arce administration as well as MAS indicated that Morales' influence in the party had declined. In late November and early December 2020, MAS officials began selecting party candidates to run in the 2021 Bolivian regional elections. In four departments (Chuquisaca, Potosí, Cochabamba, and Pando), candidates for governor endorsed by Morales were not chosen by MAS officials.

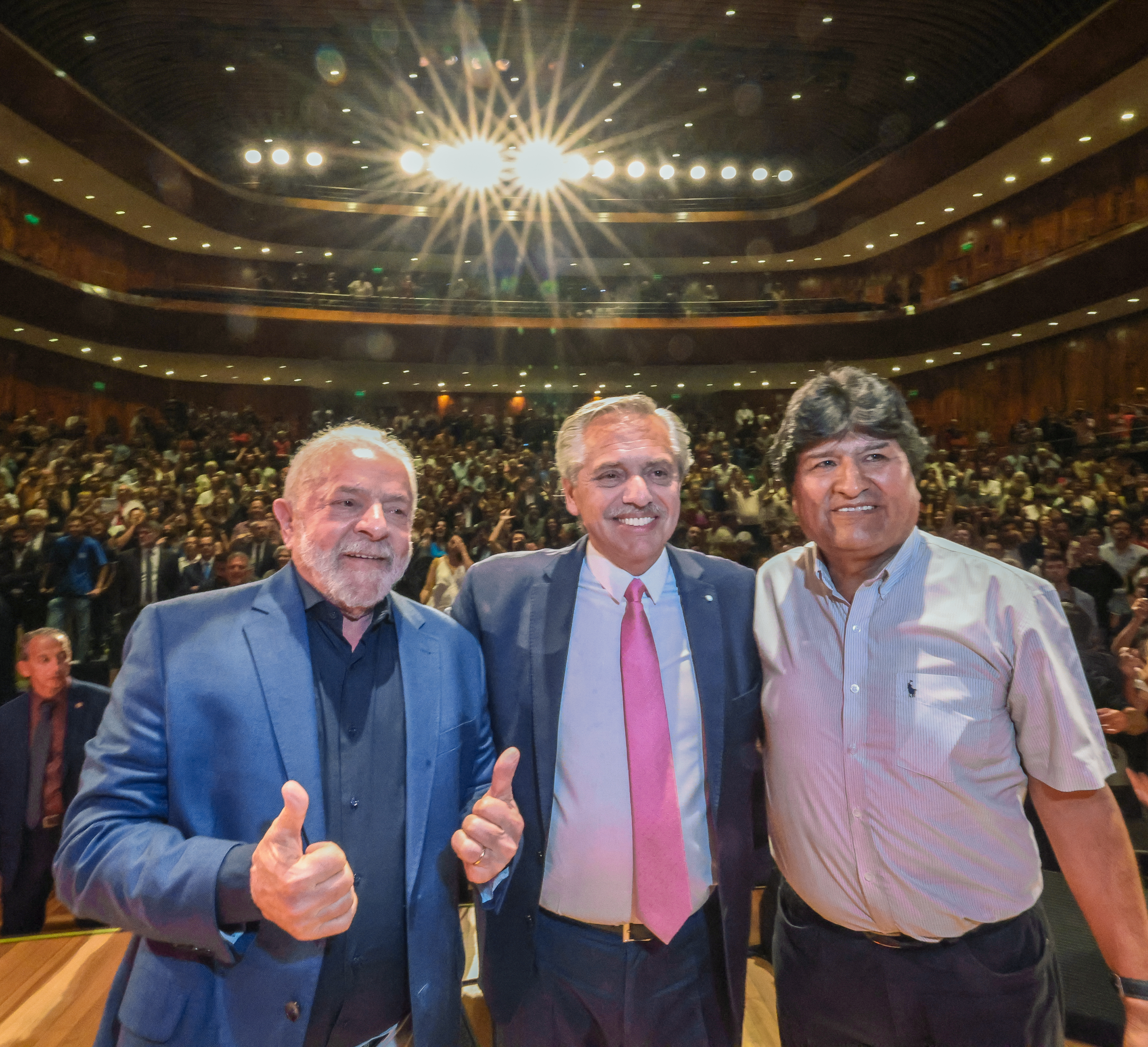
Morales with Brazilian President Luiz Inácio Lula da Silva and Argentine President Alberto Fernández, Buenos Aires, 24 January 2023

In January 2021, Morales contracted COVID-19; he received treatment from a private clinic. The following month, the Plurinational Legislative Assembly approved the Presidential Decree for the Granting of Amnesty and Pardon for Humanitarian Reasons and Political Persecuted Persons, granting amnesty to those prosecuted during the government of Jeanine Áñez, including Morales.

==== Statutory rape investigation ====
Morales has faced two statutory rape accusations. In August 2020, photographs of him with a supposed minor began circulating on social media. Journalist Alejandro Entreambasaguas and Bolivian authorities said that Morales had been in a relationship with the minor since the age of 14. Several news organisations relate the current accusations with comments that Morales had made twice previously on retiring with a quinceañera (15-year-old) when he was no longer president. On 19 August 2020, the Bolivian Prosecutor's Office began a formal investigation.

On 16 December 2024, an arrest warrant was issued against Morales on charges of "trafficking" involving a 15-year-old girl. On 17 January 2025, a judge in Tarija ordered Morales' arrest for the alleged statutory rape of a 15-year-old girl in 2015. The judge froze Morales's assets and banned him from leaving Bolivia. Morales has repeatedly refused to testify before prosecutors, and is currently residing in the Tropics of Cochabamba while facing two active arrest warrants for failing to appear in court. In an interview with The Guardian, Morales rejected the accusations and argued that "when there is no victim, there is no crime."

=== Breaking with MAS and EVO People ===
In October 2024, Morales said that he had survived an assassination attempt in Villa Tunari following a gun attack on his vehicle that injured his driver. Deputy Security Minister Roberto Rio denied launching a police operation against Morales. Interior minister Eduardo del Castillo later accused Morales of staging the incident, saying that the latter's convoy had fled an anti-drugs unit conducting a routine highway patrol, during which Morales security team fired at police and ran over an officer. The incident occurred amid Morales's criticism of President Luis Arce, which also led to antigovernment protests. On 1 November, Morales began a hunger strike demanding that Arce's government engage in dialogue.

In February 2025, Evo Morales presented his formal resignation from the ruling Movement Towards Socialism (MAS). He attempted running for president in the August 17 elections with the Front for Victory (FPV).

In March 2025, Morales founded his new party EVO Pueblo (English: EVO People), failing again to register his candidacy for the 2025 general election, but promising to participate in the 2026 Bolivian regional elections and 2030 general election. After his candidacy was rejected, he called on his supporters to cast a null vote in the 2025 election.

== Political ideology ==
The worst enemy of humanity is capitalism. That is what provokes uprisings like our own, a rebellion against a system, against a neo-liberal model, which is the representation of a savage capitalism. If the entire world doesn't acknowledge this reality, that the national states are not providing even minimally for health, education and nourishment, then each day the most fundamental human rights are being violated.

— Evo Morales

Figures in Morales' government described his political approach as "Evoism" (Spanish: Evismo). Political scientist Sven Harten characterized Morales' ideology as "eclectic", drawing ideas from "various ideological currents". Morales' economic policies have sometimes been termed "Evonomics" and focused on creating a mixed economy. Morales' government was part of the pink tide of left-leaning South American governments, becoming particularly associated with the hard left current of Venezuela and Cuba. It received praise for its pro-socialist stance among the international left, who took an interest in Bolivia under his leadership as a "political laboratory" or "a living workshop" for the development of an alternative to capitalism.

Like his allies Chavez and Correa, Morales was categorised as a populist. George Philip and Francisco Panizza noted that this was because he appealed "directly to the people against their countries' political and economic order, divided the social field into antagonistic camps and promised redistribution and recognition in a newly founded political order." Morales' presidential discourse revolved around distinguishing between "the people", of whom he saw himself as a representative, and the socio-economic elite and the old political class, whom he believes have mistreated "the people" for centuries. Morales sought to make Bolivia's representative democracy more direct and communitarian, through the introduction of referendums and a citizen-led legislative initiative.

From 2009, Morales advocated "communitarian socialism", although Harten noted that, despite his rhetoric, Morales was neither a "hardcore" anti-globalist or Marxist. Marxist commentators argued against categorising his government as socialist. Bolivia's Marxist Vice President Álvaro García Linera said that Bolivia lacks the sufficiently large industrialized working class, or proletariat, to become a socialist society in the Marxist understanding of the word. Instead, he termed the government's approach "Andean and Amazonian capitalism;" a development that would make it plausible for socialism to be fulfilled in Bolivia.

British Marxist academic Jeffery R. Webber has argued that Morales was not a socialist and his government was "reconstituting neoliberalism", thereby rejecting "neoliberal orthodoxy" but retaining a "core faith in the capitalist market as the principal engine of growth and industrialization." Similarly, Aymara activist Felipe Quispe characterized Morales' government as "neoliberalism with an Indian [i.e. indigenous] face".

== Personality and personal life ==
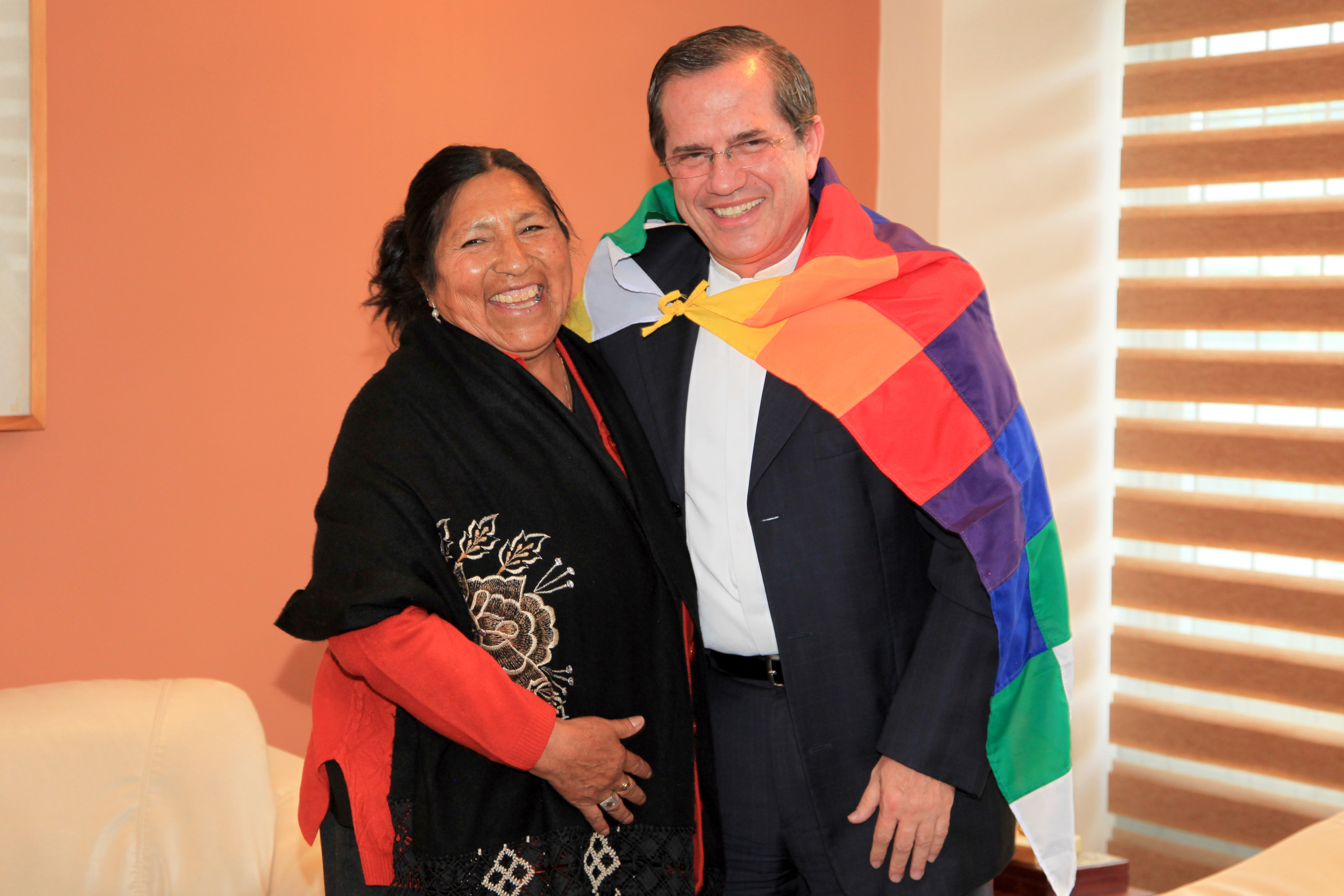
First Lady Morales with the Minister of Foreign Affairs of Ecuador Ricardo Patiño.

Morales is Aymara and has been widely described as Bolivia's first democratically elected president from the indigenous majority. Although Morales has sometimes been described as the first indigenous president elected in the Americas, the Zapotec Benito Juárez was elected President of Mexico in 1858.

Biographer Martín Sivak described Morales as "incorruptible, charismatic, and combative", noting that he had a "friendly style" and could develop a good rapport with journalists and photographers because he could "articulate his opinions with simplicity". Morales placed a great emphasis on trust, and relied on his intuition, sometimes acting on what he considered omens in his dreams. Harten said that Morales "can be a forceful leader, one who instills great respect and, sometimes, a reluctance in others to contradict him, but he has also learnt to listen and learn from other people." Farthing and Kohl characterized Morales as a "charismatic populist" of a kind common in South American history, who prioritized "a direct relationship" between the population and the leader.

Morales has commented that he is only a Roman Catholic in order "to go to weddings", and when asked if he believed in God, responded that "I believe in the land, in my father and my mother, and in cuchi-cuchi" (sexual activity). Reports state that Morales lives an ascetic life with little interest in material possessions. Morales is an association football enthusiast and plays the game frequently, often with local teams. Morales' unorthodox behavior contrasts with the usual manners of dignitaries and other political leaders in South America. During speeches he made use of personal stories and anecdotes, and used coca as a political symbol, wearing a coca leaf garland around his neck and a hat with coca leaves in it when speaking to crowds of supporters. Following his election, he wore striped jumpers (sweaters) rather than the suits typically worn by politicians. It became a symbol of Morales, with copies of it selling widely in Bolivia.

Morales is unmarried and upon becoming president selected his older sister, Esther Morales Ayma, as Bolivia's First Lady. She died in 2020. Morales has two children, daughter Evaliz Morales Alvarado and son Álvaro Morales Paredes, from different mothers. Politician Juan del Granado is Evaliz's godfather. His children left Bolivia and traveled to Buenos Aires in late November 2019.

== Influence and legacy ==
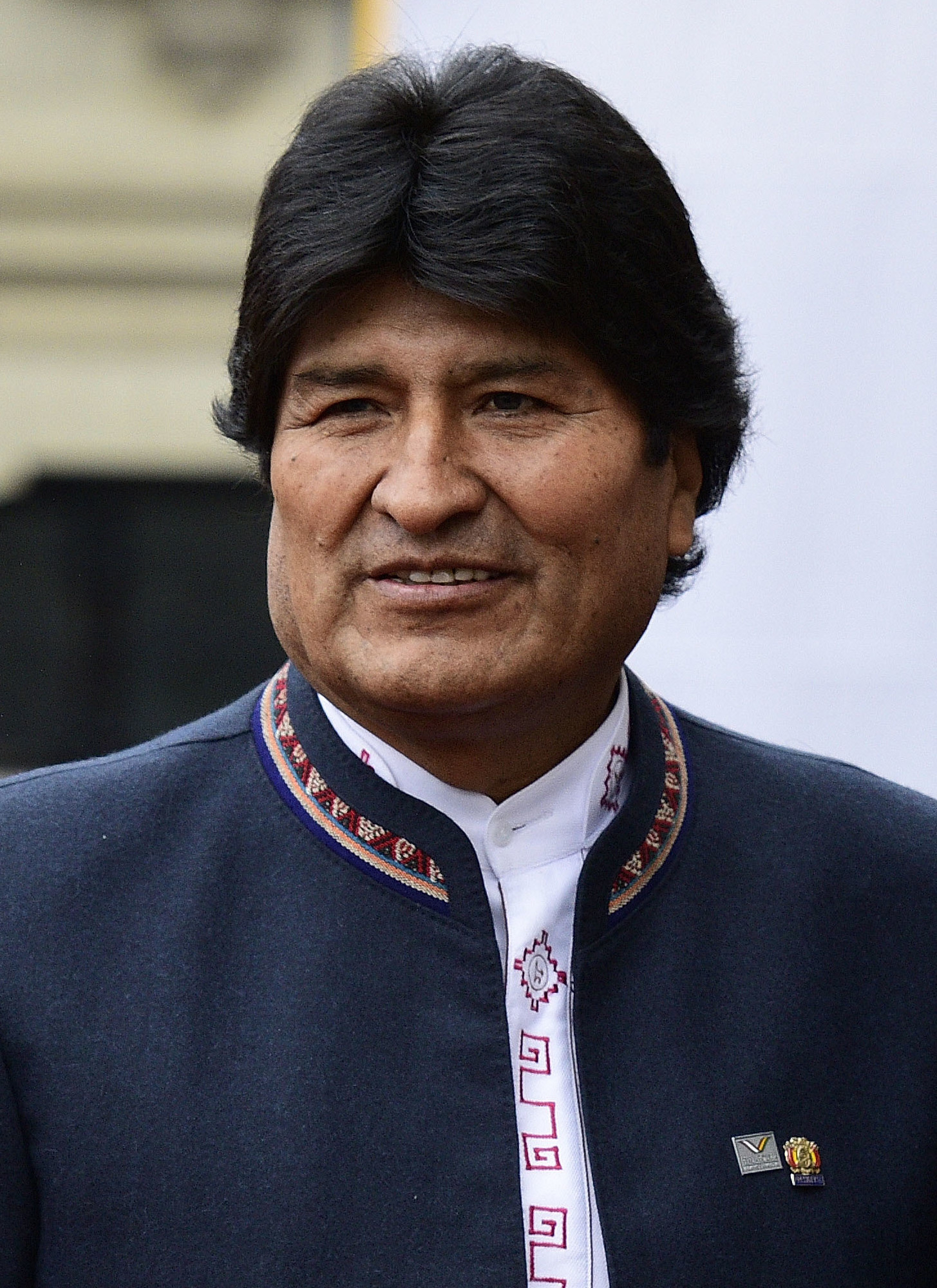
Evo Morales in 2017

Morales has been described as "the most famous Bolivian ever", whose personality has become "fixed in the global imagination". Domestically, Morales' support base has been among Bolivia's poor and indigenous communities. For these communities, who had felt marginalized in Bolivian politics for decades, Morales "invokes a sense of dignity and destiny" in a way that no other contemporary politician has done. He has received the support of many democratic socialists and social democrats, as well as sectors of Bolivia's liberal movement, who have been critical of Morales but favored him over the right-wing opposition.

Based on interviews conducted among Bolivians in 2012, John Crabtree and Ann Chaplin described the previous years of Morales' rule with the observation that: "for many—perhaps most—Bolivians, this was a period when ordinary people felt the benefits of policy in ways that had not been the case for decades, if ever." Crabtree and Chaplin added that Morales' administration had made "important changes... that will probably be difficult to reverse", including poverty reduction, the removal of some regional inequalities, and side-lining of some previously dominant political actors in favor of others who had been encouraged and enabled by his government.

On the basis of this victory, the Financial Times remarked that Morales was "one of the world's most popular leaders". On 17 October 2015, Morales surpassed Andrés de Santa Cruz's nine years, eight months, and twenty-four days in office and became Bolivia's longest serving president. Writing in The Guardian, Ellie Mae O'Hagan attributes his enduring popularity not to anti-imperialist rhetoric but his "extraordinary socio-economic reforms", which resulted in poverty and extreme poverty declining by 25% and 43% respectively. Bolivia's newly implemented universal healthcare system has been cited as a model for all by the World Health Organization.

The Bolivian healthcare system has made significant progress. Under-5 mortality in 2019 was 26, half of what it was in 2006. Infant mortality was 21.2 in 2019, approximately half of what it was in 2006. Bolivia's maternal mortality rate is 160 per 100,000 which makes it one of the highest in the region and it's estimated to be even higher. Before Evo Morales took office nearly half of all infants weren't vaccinated and now nearly all are.

Critics, particularly in the U.S. government, have varyingly termed him "a left-wing radical, a partner of narco-traffickers and a terrorist". Domestic opposition to Morales' governance has centered in the wealthy eastern lowland province of Santa Cruz. His policies often antagonized middle-class Bolivians, who deemed them too radical and argued that they threatened private property. His most vociferous critics have been from Bolivia's conservative movement, although he has also received criticism from the country's far left, who believe his reformist policies have been insufficiently radical or socialist. Many of these leftist critics were unhappy that Morales' government did not make a total break with global capitalism. His government has also faced many of the same complaints directed at previous Bolivian administrations, revolving around such issues as "concentration of power, corruption, incompetent bureaucracies, and disrespect for civil liberties".

Crabtree and Chaplin's study led them to conclude that while Morales' initial election had brought "huge expectations" from many Bolivians, especially in the social movements, there had been "inevitable frustrations" at his administration's inability to deliver on everything that they had hoped. They thought that the "heady optimism" that had characterized Morales' first term in office had given way to "a climate of questioning and growing criticism of the government and its policies". Crabtree and Chaplin claimed that though the Bolivian economy had grown, the material benefits had not been as high as many Bolivians had hoped. Crabtree and Chaplin argued that the experiences of his administration had "drawn attention to the difficulties involved in bringing change in the patterns of development in one of Latin America's poorest and most unequal nations". Similarly, Harten thought that Morales' discourse of "the people" against the socio-economic elites has brought a spotlight on the deep social polarization in Bolivia.

Morales promised to "help bring power" to marginalised groups in Bolivia, a country which has the highest percentage of indigenous population of any country in the Americas. His presidency saw poverty reduced by 42% and extreme poverty reduced by 60%. Mark Schneider of the Center for Strategic and International Studies' Americas Program, said that there was no question that Morales's government was successful in helping to raise the living standards of the poor population which was synonymously the indigenous population. Professor Robert Albro described Morales's legacy as "transformation of Bolivian society through the enfranchisement of the country's indigenous population."

=== Pragmatic socialism ===
Morales' brand of pragmatic socialism was a program that was one of many among the pink tide that swept throughout the South American continent in the 2000s, where a number of left-wing leaders rose to power with socialist and social democratic leanings. Morales was opposed to neoliberal policies of austerity and privatization, and after coming into office in 2006, his administration nationalised the oil and gas sector. Using the funds derived from the nationalised natural gas and oil businesses, his administration invested heavily in basic sanitation, agriculture, education, water resources, transportation and health with the strategic goal to tackle the structural causes of poverty. By 2014, Morales' anti-poverty programs won him wide support as the country saw poverty reduced by 25%, extreme poverty reduced by 43%, social spending being increased by over 45%, and the real minimum wage being increased by 87.7%. According to the Center for Economic and Policy Research in Washington in regards to Bolivia's economy during Morales's governance, "Bolivia has grown much faster over the last eight years than in any period over the past three and a half decades."

=== Authoritarianism ===
Under Morales, Bolivia experienced democratic backsliding. According to a 2013 study, "Evo Morales and his Movement Toward Socialism have used trumped-up charges of administrative irregularities, corruption, terrorism, and genocide against numerous opposition politicians, imprisoning some, driving many others out of the country, and intimidating the rest. The competitiveness that is essential to democracy cannot survive in such a hostile setting." Some scholars characterized Bolivia under Morales as a competitive authoritarian regime. Freedom House classifies Bolivia as a partly-free democracy as of 2023, with a 66/100 score.

=== Allegations of creating a narco-state ===
Morales has faced criticism concerning his links with the coca farming in Bolivia and alleged links with the illegal cocaine trafficking market. These range from Morales "closing his eyes to a drug-trafficking problem that is only getting worse" to open accusations that he is facilitating a narco-state. In 2008, two years into his first term as president, he expelled the DEA from the country. Between them, Colombia, Bolivia and Peru produce almost all of the world's cocaine. The coca growers unions are allegedly the main drug suppliers for the international market.

From 2003 to 2011, the area used for growing coca illicitly increased year on year but declined to reach a 12-year low in 2015 at 20,400 hectares. In subsequent years, however, illicit coca productions continued to rise to 24,500 hectare in 2017. In 2017, Morales signed a law that increased the legal amount of land in Bolivia designated to coca farming from 12,000 hectares to 22,000 hectares, a figure which has since been exceeded. A 2014 study by the EU estimated only 14,700 hectares was used for chewing and teas. Between 2018 and 2019, the area used for coca farming increased from 23,100 hectares to 25,500, an increase of 10.39%, prompting concern from the EU. The estimated tonnage of coca produced for commercial purposes increased from 19,334 tonnes in 2008 to 24,178 tonnes in 2018, an overall increase of 31.85%. A 2019 UN report said that 94% of coca production in the Chapare, the largest coca region of Bolivia, did not pass through the designated legal market in Sacaba. For Bolivia as a whole, 65% of coca trade was undocumented, accounting for 55,000 tonnes of dry coca leaves. The 2019 report by UNODC also reports increases in the area used for coca farming of up to 171% in five protected areas.

Observers alleged that corruption among political figures and low-level criminal activity associated with the cocaine trade is normal with researcher Diego Ayo from the Vicente Pazos Kanki Foundation considering the power structure of the Bolivian State similar to that of a drug cartel. In 2012, the Brazilian magazine Veja accused Evo Morales and his then minister Juan Ramón Quintana, of providing raw material for the production of drugs that were destined for Brazil. That same year senator Roger Pinto asked Brazil for political asylum for fear of an attack on his personal security and for having "evidence of corruption and links with drug trafficking at the highest levels of the government of President Evo Morales". In October 2020, the FELCN (the Bolivian anti-narcotics police force) and the interim government announced seizures of over 12 tons of cocaine and 436 tons of marijuana in the last year. The FELCN also destroyed 806 factories and 26 cocaine laboratories and confiscated 453 vehicles, 111 buildings and 20 light aircraft and cash.

Bolivia's anti-drug strategy is often considered more successful than those of Colombia and Peru because it is based on cooperation with coca farmers rather than brutal or military repression. Bolivia recognizes the coca leaf as a traditional crop and legalizes a certain amount of cultivation for licit uses. Rather than imposing eradication by force, the government has negotiated with farmers to voluntarily reduce the area under cultivation beyond legal quotas. Coca production in Bolivia remained stable during the 2010s and declined compared to the 2000s, while it increased sharply in Colombia and Peru.

== Electoral history ==
Year	Office	Party or alliance	Votes			Result	Ref.
Year	Office	Party or alliance	Total	%	P.	Result	Ref.
1989	Deputy	United Left	32,870	14.43%	4th (Note: Presented on an electoral list. The data shown represent the share of the vote the entire party/alliance received in that constituency.)	Lost	
1993	Deputy	Pachakuti Axis	1,604	0.67%	11th	Lost	
1997	Deputy	United Left	14,024	70.13%	1st	Won	
2002	Deputy	Movement Toward Socialism	18,890	83.16%	1st	Won	
2002	President	Movement Toward Socialism	581,884	20.94%	2nd	Lost	
2005	President	Movement Toward Socialism	1,544,374	53.74%	1st	Won	
2009	President	Movement Toward Socialism	2,943,209	64.22%	1st	Won	
2014	President	Movement Toward Socialism	3,173,304	61.36%	1st	Won	
2019	President	Movement Toward Socialism	2,889,359	47.08%	1st	Annulled	
Source: Plurinational Electoral Organ | Electoral Atlas

== Honors and awards ==
Award or decoration	Country	Date	Place	Note
Grand Collar of the Order of the Liberator	Venezuela	5 July 2006	Caracas	Venezuelan highest distinction.
Order of Augusto César Sandino	Nicaragua	11 January 2007	Managua	Nicaraguan highest distinction.
Grand Collar of the Order of the Sun of Peru	Peru	19 October 2010	Ilo	Peruvian highest distinction.
Order of the Star of Carabobo, First Class	Venezuela	25 June 2014	La Paz	
Order of José Martí	Cuba	21 May 2016	Havana	Cuban highest distinction.
Knight of the Honorary Order of the Yellow Star	Suriname	10 July 2019	Paramaribo	

=== Honorary degrees ===
- Bolivia: Universidad Pública de El Alto honorary degree, 20 December 2008.
- Argentina: National University of La Plata honorary degree, 28 April 2009.
- Argentina: National University of Comahue honorary degree, 28 April 2010.
- Bolivia: Universidad Privada del Valle honorary degree, 31 July 2010.
- South Korea: Hansei University honorary degree, 25 August 2010.
- Argentina: National University of San Juan honorary degree, 1 September 2010.
- China: Renmin University of China honorary degree, 11 August 2011.
- Cuba: University of Havana honorary degree, 19 September 2011.
- Argentina: National University of Salta honorary degree, 18 November 2014.
- Italy: Sapienza University of Rome honorary degree, 6 November 2015.
- France: University of Pau and the Adour Region honorary degree, 7 November 2015.
- Argentina: National University of Entre Ríos honorary degree, 13 September 2018.
- Guatemala: Universidad de San Carlos de Guatemala honorary degree, 15 November 2018.
- Argentina: National University of Tierra del Fuego honorary degree, 27 February 2019.
- Russia: Peoples' Friendship University of Russia honorary degree, 11 July 2019.
- Argentina: Universidad Nacional de las Artes honorary degree, 30 October 2020.

== See also ==
- Domestic policy of Evo Morales
- Foreign policy of Evo Morales
- Evo Morales and the Roman Catholic Church

Party political offices
Preceded by David Áñez	President of the Movement Toward Socialism; 1997–2025	Succeeded by Grover García
New political party	President of EVO Pueblo; 2025–present	Incumbent
Diplomatic posts
Preceded by Mauricio Macri	President pro tempore of UNASUR; 2018–2019	Vacant
Preceded by Salvador Sánchez Cerén	President pro tempore of CELAC; 2019	Succeeded by Jeanine Áñez
Political offices
Preceded by Eduardo Rodríguez Veltzé	President of Bolivia; 2006–2019	Succeeded by Jeanine Áñez
