= Saraguro (disambiguation) =

Saraguro is the capital of Saraguro Canton in Loja Province, Ecuador.

Saraguro may also refer to:

- Saraguro Canton, Ecuador
- Saraguro people, an indigenous people of Ecuador
