= 1827 Guayaquil uprising =

Guayaquil Department rebellion
- Part of the Dissolution of Gran Colombia
- Location of the department of Guayaquil in Gran Colombia
- Date: April–October 1827
- Location: Guayaquil department, Colombia
- Outcome: Military intervention by Colombian troops that re-established the constitutional order in the rebel department.

The 1827 Guayaquil uprising, also known as the Guayaquil Department rebellion, was a rejection of the centralist policies of Gran Colombia. It was one of the first separatist rebellions in Gran Colombia before the country dissolved in 1829.

The Free Province of Guayaquil, an unrecognized state that emerged after it declared its independence on October 9, 1820, was militarily annexed by Gran Colombia in 1822. As a result of the promulgation of the Territorial Division Law of 1824, it became one of the three departments of the Southern District. Colombian policies strengthened New Granadan centralism, imposed various taxes, and divided the departments into several provinces and cantons with their own municipalities. This all undermined the power of the authorities in the departmental capitals and caused unrest in various parts of the country. In addition, the drafting of the Life Constitution for Peru and the similar project in Bolivia by Simón Bolívar generated much controversy, and a mutiny in the Colombian military. The Cabildo of Guayaquil endorsed the Bolivian constitution, ignored the Constitution of Cúcuta, and appointed José de la Mar as its new mayor. In addition, it proclaimed total autonomy from the Republic.

The departure of La Mar and sending of Colombian troops from Quito and Bogotá to the borders of the department made the Cabildo of Guayaquil state that it supported a federalist constitutional reform, and temporarily suspended its autonomy, until the formation of a new constituent congress. However, its political autonomy lasted until October 1827, when General Juan José Flores entered the city of Guayaquil with the Colombian army to restore constitutional order.

== Background ==
=== Free Province of Guayaquil ===
The Spanish-American wars of independence that began around 1810 permeated emancipatory ideas in Guayaquil society, which developed an independence movement that concluded with the taking of power in the city on October 9, 1820. A provisional civil and military government was formed, as well as an army to ensure and preserve the independent status against the troops loyal to the Spanish Crown. The Free Province of Guayaquil emerged after the proclamation of the Reglamento Provisorio de Gobierno (provisional constitution) on November 11 of that year as an independent state, which was not recognized during the war period. The Guayaquil army, known as the Protective Division of Quito, began a military campaign to achieve the independence of the other territories of the former Presidency of Quito.

Following a victory in the battle of Camino Real, the Protective Division advanced rapidly through the inter-Andean alley towards the north but defeat in the first battle of Huachi forced a withdrawal back to the coast. Simón Bolívar wanted to ensure the independence of the newly created Republic of Colombia (known as Gran Colombia) by sending a division of his army from New Granada to Guayaquil to renew the attack on the royalists entrenched in the Quito mountains. The Colombian army, commanded by Antonio José de Sucre, merged with the Guayaquil troops, with certain Peruvian and River Plate elements, initiated the so-called Campaign of the South that concluded with the independence victory at the battle of Pichincha on May 24, 1822.

=== Manu militari annexation ===
The intention of the Guayaquil government board was to form a new state from the former Presidency of Quito. However, the city of Cuenca decided to annex itself to Gran Colombia on April 11, 1822; and the Quito authorities, after the battle of Pichincha, also made the decision to join the Colombian nation on Sucre's suggestion on May 29. The Free Province of Guayaquil, whose army had suffered many casualties after its involvement in the Southern Campaigns, decided to remain autonomous from any other state.

In the city of Guayaquil, there were three factions within the population and its authorities; there were those who preferred an annexation to Colombia, while others saw it more favorably for the territory to be part of Peru, and lastly, those who wanted the province to remain independent and autonomous, among whom were José Joaquín de Olmedo and other members of the Government Board. Its status as the main port on the Pacific coast and its rapid commercial growth made Peruvian claims manifest through General José de San Martín. Simón Bolívar, aware of the Peruvian advance, intended to meet in Guayaquil with San Martín to determine his situation. However, Bolívar went ahead and entered Guayaquil on July 11 with an army of three thousand soldiers, forcing the resignation of the Governing Board and proclaiming himself dictator. The interview between Bolívar and San Martín took place on July 26, and dealt with other issues with Peruvian disadvantage in claiming Guayaquil territory. Finally, on July 31, 1822, Bolívar formally decreed the annexation of the occupied Free Province of Guayaquil into Gran Colombia.

=== Territorial division of 1824 and taxes ===
The Republic of Colombia (historically known as Gran Colombia to differentiate it from the current republic of the same name) was formally established with the merger of Venezuela and the United Provinces of New Granada in the Congress of Angostura in 1819, which drafted the Fundamental Law of the Republic, ratified by the Congress of Cúcuta on July 12, 1821, under the official name of the Constitution of the Republic of Colombia. Initially, the Gran Colombian territory included only Venezuela and New Granada, but Panama was incorporated in 1821, while Cuenca, Quito and Guayaquil were incorporated in 1822. On June 25, 1824, the Senate and the House of Representatives promulgated the Law of Territorial Division of the Republic which divided the Colombian territory into twelve departments grouped into three districts. Each department was subdivided into several provinces, and these in turn into several cantons.

With the law of 1824, the department of Guayaquil was divided into two provinces: Guayaquil and Manabí. The province of Guayaquil was divided into the cantons of Guayaquil, Daule, Babahoyo, Baba, Punta de Santa Elena and Machala, and the province of Manabí was divided into the cantons of Portoviejo, Jipijapa, and Montecristi. The cities aspired to regain some control over the rural territory, they had held for much of the Colony and lost during the Cadiz regime; however, the creation of the 1824 law established a municipality in each canton head. Several parts of the country were dissatisfied with this provision.

The wars of the Colombian State were supported financially by various taxes and forced contributions. In the municipalities, they opposed the figure of the intendente, who was subject to the central executive power and regulated fiscal resources. The population was opposed to direct contributions falling on owners and professionals. The protests raised in various parts of Colombia caused the rate to be replaced in 1826 by the poll tax, a tax levied on all men between 14 and 60 years of age; This tax was only in force for two years due to the refusal of the general population to pay it.

=== La Cosiata ===
La Cosiata, also known as the "Morrocoyes revolution", broke out in the city of Valencia in Venezuela, led by General José Antonio Páez on April 30, 1826. Several Venezuelan municipalities rebelled in favor of autonomy from the Colombian government, and proclaimed Páez as civil and military chief. This event laid the foundations for the later separation of Venezuela from Gran Colombia.

=== Bolivarian Constitution ===
By the beginning of 1825, Peru had not consolidated its independence and there were still redoubts loyal to the Spanish Crown. Simón Bolívar was dictator of Peru, a position that was estimated to be close to being replaced by the election of a purely Peruvian government and that would lead to the restoration of the Peruvian constitution of 1823; however, the Peruvian Congress decided to extend the Bolivarian dictatorship on February 10, and a month later, on March 10, it ceased its functions by its own decision.

== 1827 Rebellion ==
In Guayaquil, the Departmental Rebellion of April 16, 1827, led by Vicente Rocafuerte and José Joaquín de Olmedo, with the support of the Guayaquil people, expressed a desire to rebel against the centralist government of Colombia. The protagonists of this feat were the brothers Juan Francisco and Antonio Elizalde, and also Marshal José Domingo de La Mar y Cortázar, who was appointed civil and military chief.

After the decision by the revolutionaries, the authorities representing the Colombian government, including General Tomás Cipriano de Mosquera and Colonel Rafael Urdaneta, who later became president of Gran Colombia, hastily left the city.

== New annexation to Gran Colombia ==
Several times that year the Colombian government tried to retake Guayaquil, even sending troops under Generals José Gabriel Pérez and Juan José Flores, but no attempt was successful.

Guayaquil became autonomous again and remained so for three months, until mid-July, 1827, when Marshal José de la Mar had to leave the city for having been appointed President of Peru. Simón Bolívar took advantage of this situation to get the separatist forces to give up their attitude, offering total amnesty to the city and the entire province.

Finally, in September the revolution had been completely quelled, things returned to normal and the province returned to the centralist subjection where it had been before April 16.

== Bibliography ==
- Ayala Mora, Enrique (2008). Ayala Mora, Enrique, ed. Manual de Historia del Ecuador (Primera edición). Quito: Corporación Editora Nacional. ISBN 978-9978-84-355-0.
- Hoyos Galarza, Melvin; Avilés Pino, Efrén (2009). Historia de Guayaquil. Guayaquil: M.I. Municipalidad de Guayaquil. ISBN 978-9978-92-614-7.
- Morelli, Federica (1 de julio de 2018). «“Una gran asociación de pueblos”. La rebelión en Guayaquil y su percepción de la Gran Colombia (1827)». Anuario Colombiano de Historia Social y de la Cultura 45 (2): 149-174. doi:10.15446/achsc.v45n2.71030.
- Suárez Fernández, Luis; Hernández Sánchez-Barba, Mario (1992). Historia general de España y América. (Segunda edición). Madrid: Ed. Rialp. ISBN 8432121126.
- Pollack, Aaron (18 de julio de 2016). «De la contribución directa proporcional a la capitación en la Hispanoamérica republicana: Los límites impuestos por la constitución fiscal». Araucaria (Sureste, Chiapas: Centro de Investigaciones y Estudios Superiores en Antropología Social) (36): 59–86. doi:10.12795/araucaria.2016.i36.04.
- Vela Witt, María Susana (1999). El Departamento del Sur en la Gran Colombia, 1822-1830 (Primera edición). Quito: Ediciones Abya-Yala. ISBN 9978044973.
