= Villamil =

Villamil or Villaamil may refer to:

== Places ==
- Villamil, a hamlet in Tapia de Casariego, Spain
- Puerto Villamil, on Isabela Island in the Galapagos Islands, Ecuador
- General Villamil Playas, a town in Ecuador

== People ==
- Villamil (surname), a list of people with the surname
- Villaamil, a list of people with the surname

== Ships ==
- Spanish destroyer Villaamil, a Spanish Navy destroyer in commission from 1916 to 1932
