= October 9 Revolution =

Declaration of independence of Guayaquil from the Spanish Empire

Independence of Guayaquil
- Part of the Spanish American wars of independence
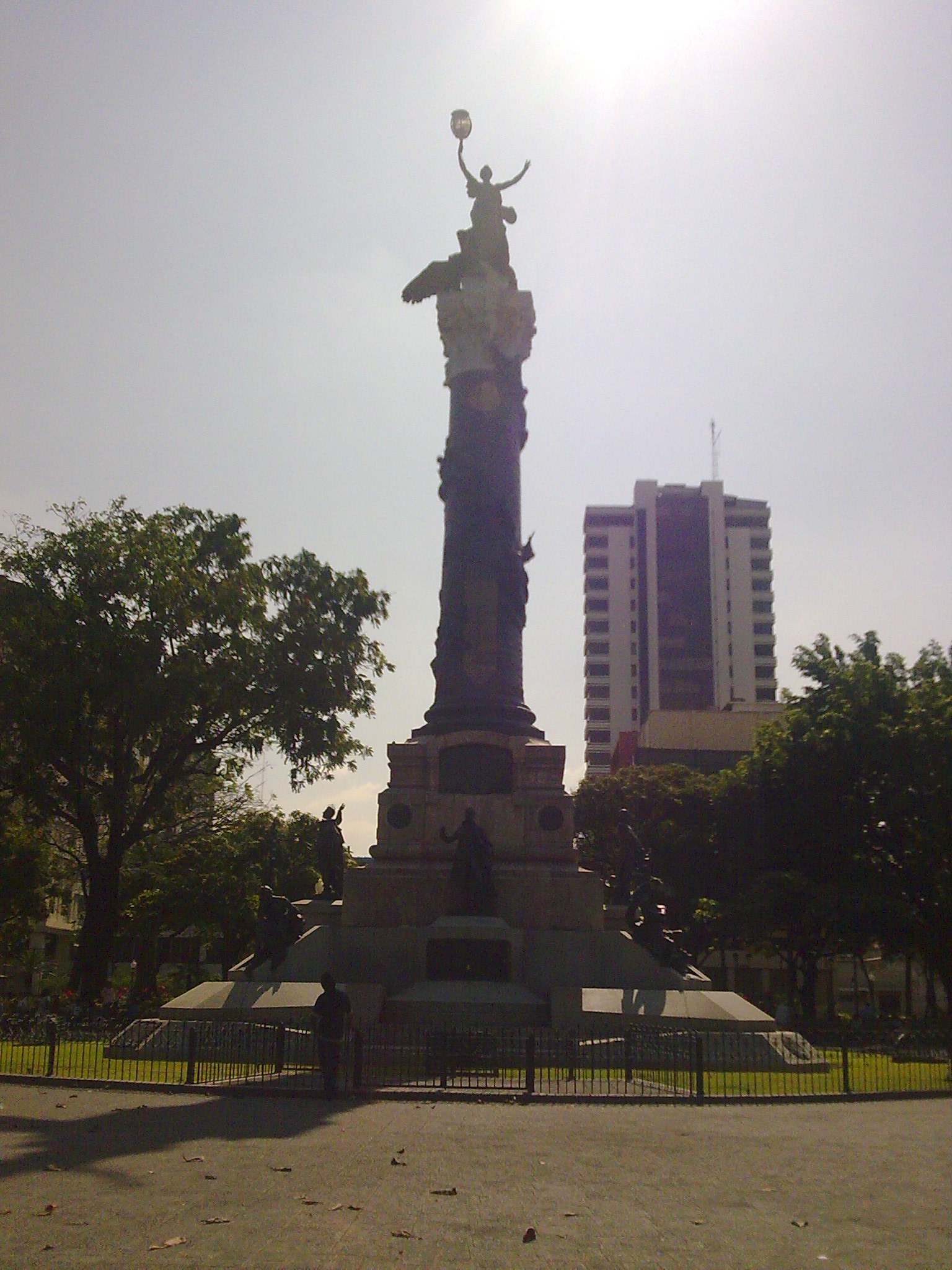
Date	October 9, 1820
Location	Guayaquil
Result	Creation of the Free Province of Guayaquil

Belligerents
Free Province of Guayaquil	Spanish Empire

Commanders and leaders
José de Olmedo; José de Antepara; José de Villamil; León de Cordero; Antonio y Lamar; Francisco de Marcos; Francisco de Lavayen; Gregorio Escobedo; Luis Urdaneta; Miguel de Letamendi; Rafael Ximena; Francisco Roca; Juan Elizalde; Vicente Roca	Fernando VII; Juan de Urbina; Joaquín Magallar †; Antonio Fominaya; Francisco y Vargas; Francisco Tamariz

Casualties and losses
None	1 killed

The October 9 Revolution was a successful revolt against the Spanish Empire in Guayaquil on October 9, 1820. It was led by the General Antonio José de Sucre and directed by Simón Bolívar. The revolt established a revolutionary junta and created the Free Province of Guayaquil, an independent state. The independence of Guayaquil revived the war of independence of the Real Audiencia de Quito as part of the Spanish American wars of independence. Prominent events in the revolution include the uprising of the Spanish garrison in the city of Guayaquil (formed essentially by the Cuzco Reserve Grenadier regiment) and the control of the Pacific by the Liberating Expedition of Peru, under the command of José de San Martín.

After military setbacks, Simón Bolívar's reached out to Sucre to come to Guayaquil. The liberating army included Ecuadorians from the Inter-Andean and Coastal regions, Granadans from Venezuela, Colombia, Peruvians and Spaniards who were supporters of the cause.

In traditional Ecuadorian history, several popular uprisings such as the "Crisis de las Alcabalas" in 1592, and the "Rebelión de los Estancos" in 1765 have been seen as precursors to the city's independence.

The first uprising calling for a Creole government and independence from Spain in the Real Audiencia of Quito was on August 10, 1809. This was promoted among certain sectors of the Quito population by the works and legacy of Eugenio Espejo. This event is traditionally known as the "First Cry of Independence", however, the leaders of the cause never spoke clearly of independence, but more of political autonomy concerning the metropolis and the capital of the viceroyalty. They swore allegiance to King Ferdinand VII, thus opposing the invasion that Spain was suffering at the time by Napoleon's French troops, and the proclamation of Joseph Bonaparte as the new king. The troops sent by the Viceroy of Peru, José Fernando de Abascal y Sousa, on whom the Real Audiencia of Quito depended at the time, put an end to the popular resistance on November 8, 1810.

Other causes that influenced the independence of Guayaquil were the emancipatory campaigns in the northern region of South America, led by Simón Bolívar. Also, the advent of José de San Martín's expedition to liberate Peru from Chile together with Lord Thomas Cochrane's naval campaigns blockading the main ports of the South Pacific, such as Callao and Guayaquil, weakened the Spanish forces of the Quito Audiencia.

Prominent figures of the revolution include Dr. José Joaquín de Olmedo, José de Antepara, and General José de Villamil.

== Background ==
=== First uprisings in the Real Audiencia of Quito ===
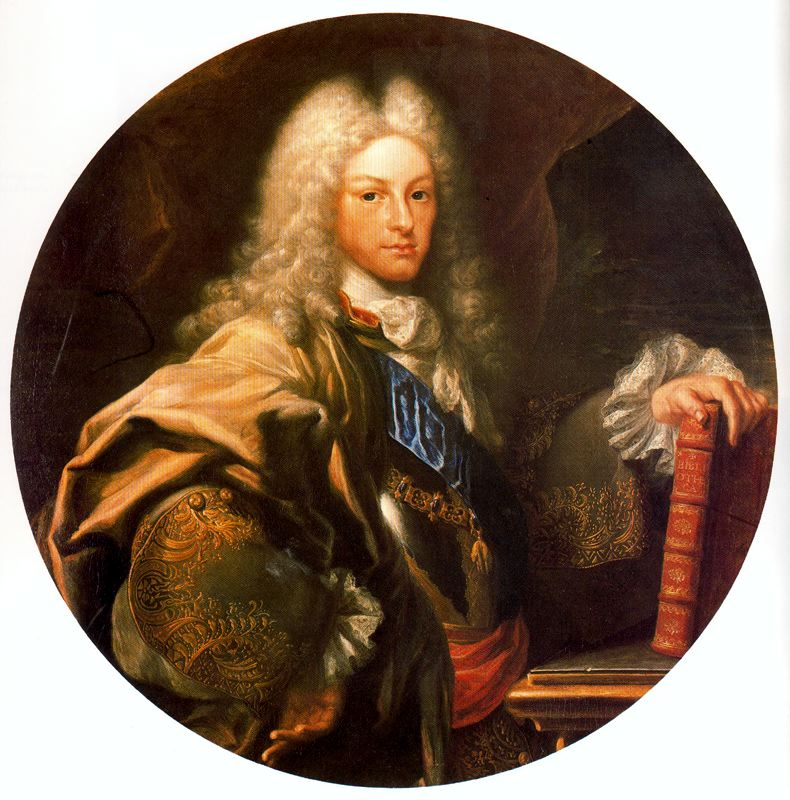
Felipe V, King of Spain

In colonial times, there were various rebellions against the Spanish regime. In the Real Audiencia of Quito, between July 1592 and April 1593, the Crisis of the Alcabalas took place. It resulted in a confrontation between Criollos, supported by the councils, and the Crown, who defended the interests of the Audiencia. The main reason for these events was the alcabala taxes imposed on the entire Viceroyalty of Peru for the Criollos, exempting the indigenous people. The reason for these taxes was the costly wars Spain was waging in northern Europe. The disturbances led to violent confrontations that were controlled by troops sent by the Viceroy of Peru. As a consequence of these uprisings, the council was sanctioned and the autonomy that the city of Quito had enjoyed was diminished.

The political, administrative, and economic changes of the Audiencia, established by the Spaniards in 1765, provoked a new confrontation between criollos and chapetones. Known as the Rebellion of the Estancos, the uprising sought the return of a decentralized government like that previously implemented by the Spanish monarchs of the House of Austria and the House of Bourbon.It wanted to restore the level of participation that the local sectors had in the state decisions. The King of Spain Felipe V, using an ordinance, nationalized the production and distribution of aguardiente. The rebels protested because the sale of this product had been established as free in 1738. This fact strengthened the power that the Criollo elite possessed.

=== Revolutionary idealism and international factors ===
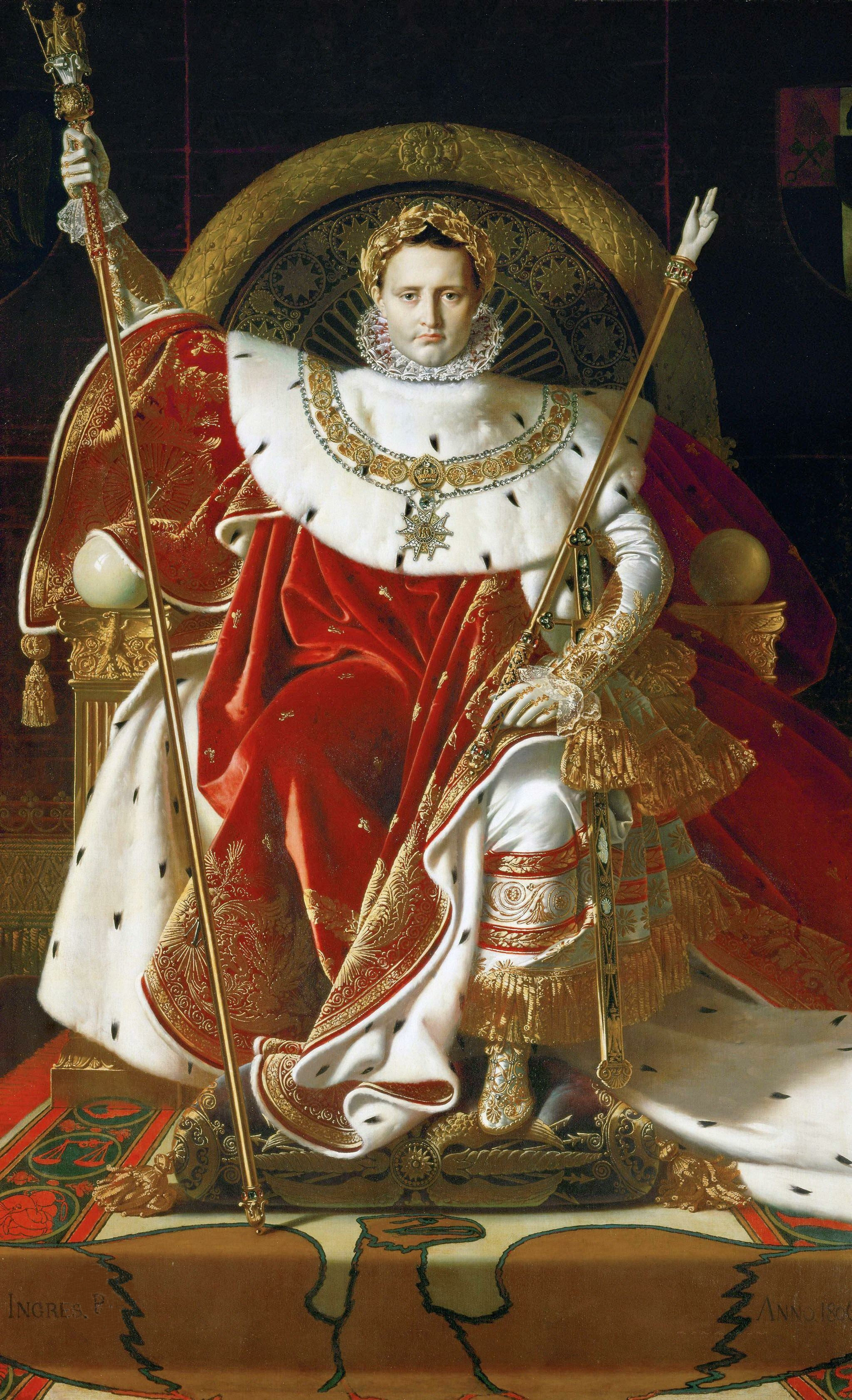
Napoleon on his imperial throne, by Jean Auguste Dominique Ingres, 1806

After the American Revolution, the movement against European colonialism in the Americas began to take shape. The American independence victory in 1776 had repercussions that affected not just other American countries, but the European continent itself where historical, economic, and military rivalries remained. Several European empires contributed economically and militarily to the North American revolutionaries in an effort to weaken the British.

In Latin America, especially in the Spanish colonies, the figure of Napoleon Bonaparte was fundamental. In 1808, Napoleonic French forces invaded Spain, with the firm desire to occupy the Iberian Peninsula and thus consolidate the formation of the First French Empire. Over time, King Carlos IV was forced to abdicate in the city of Bayonne in favor of his son, Fernando VII.

King Ferdinand VII abdicated almost immediately, with Napoleon Bonaparte naming his brother, José Bonaparte, as King of Spain. The Statute of Bayonne was manifested, recognizing the autonomy of the American provinces from Spanish rule. The fact that inhabitants of those immense territories, never wanted to accept the plans of the emperor is essential to understanding the emancipation movements.

=== Quito rebellion ===
Eugenio Espejo instilled the first independence sentiments in Quito Criollo society, with publications such as "El Nuevo Luciano de Quito" and later, the newspaper, "Primicias de la cultura de Quito". For his actions, he was persecuted and imprisoned several times by the Spanish authorities. One of the people influenced by Espejo was Juan Pío Montúfar, II Marquis of Selva Alegre. Together with several other enlightened Quito citizens, such as Juan de Dios Morales and Manuel Rodríguez de Quiroga, they planned to overthrow president Manuel Ruiz Urriés de Castilla. Their actions mirrored the sentiments of many in Spain who were rejecting the new French administration and constituting themselves as sovereign boards loyal to Ferdinand VII.

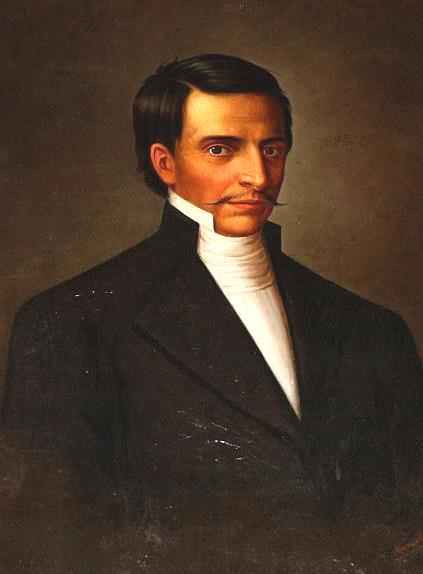
Francisco Javier Eugenio de Santa Cruz y Espejo

The Quito revolution took place on August 10, 1809, with the installation of the president Marquis of Selva Alegre, who recognized King Ferdinand VII as the only legitimate authority. All Ecuadorians celebrate the revolt of August 10, 1809, as the day of independence. It was the inspiration for many other revolts seeking independence from the Spanish yoke.

The organizers of the August 10 revolution were imprisoned and put on trial. In an attempt to pacify the region, Lima troops commanded by Manuel de Arredondo were sent in. An uprising ensued against the military occupation. However, the revolt was brutally beaten down by the Lima troops, resulting in the murder of approximately 300 people, roughly 1% of the city's population.

As a consequence of these events, and the arrival of Carlos Montúfar, Royal Commissioner of the Central Board, a second Sovereign Board was established. In light of actions occurring in other territories held by the Spanish in the Americas, the independent State of Quito was created on December 11, 1811.

However, the State of Quito had an ephemeral existence, given that the viceregal troops that arrived from Lima under the command of Toribio Montes, progressively defeated the Quito armies, until they conquered the city in the Battle of El Panecillo, on November 8, 1812. The Royalist victory was secured on December 1, 1812 in the Battle of Ibarra.

=== Beginnings of the Spanish-American War of Independence with Spain ===
In 1808, Spain was weakened by the wars in Europe and saw conflicts begin in all of South America. In Mexico, the political crisis of 1808 originated, and in Montevideo, like several other places later, designated self-government boards were created, thus originating the Spanish-American wars of independence.

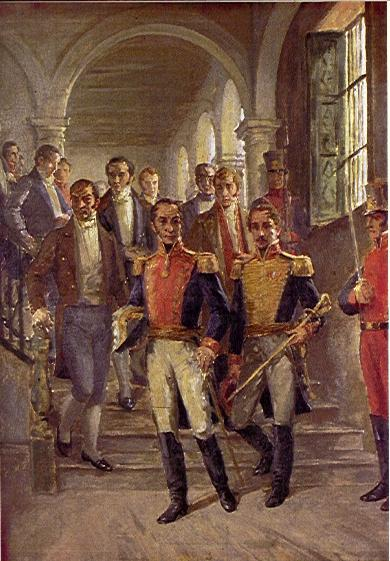
Simón Bolívar and Francisco de Paula Santander in the Congress of Cúcuta

Among the independence leaders, also called liberators, are most of the "fathers of the country" of the Latin American countries, such as Simón Bolívar, José de San Martín, José Artigas, Francisco de Paula Santander, Bernardo O'Higgins, Antonio José de Sucre, Miguel Hidalgo and José María Morelos, among others.

Bolívar, one of the most prominent leaders of South American emancipation, began the wars of independence in the Captaincy General of Venezuela, also extending to the Viceroyalty of New Granada. Among his most outstanding exploits is the Admirable Campaign and his time in Jamaica and Haiti. Already in 1818, the situation of the Spanish Army in Venezuela became untenable and several Spanish generals were forced to withdraw some of their forces from New Granada to try to contain Bolívar. By then the political and military situation was good enough to think about the organization of a State and that is how the Supreme Congress of the Republic was installed in Angostura in 1819.

The proclamation of the birth of Gran Colombia and the presence of the independence armies near its borders, made the royalist forces in the Real Audiencia of Quito mobilize and several sectors were left unprotected. This was followed by the Battle of Pantano de Vargas on July 25, 1819, and the Battle of Boyacá on August 7, 1819, which resulted in a great victory for Bolívar and the revolutionary army.

As a result, the military attention of the Quito Presidency would focus on controlling the northern borders.

== Beginnings of the campaign ==
=== La Fragua de Vulcano ===
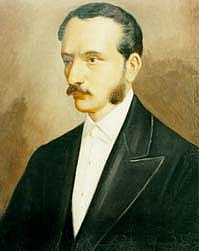
José de Antepara

One of the forerunners of Guayaquil independence was José María de la Concepción de Antepara y Arenaza, who, after living in Europe and meeting characters with independence ideals such as Francisco de Miranda, returned to the city of Guayaquil in 1814 and quickly established friendships with supporters of emancipation such as José de Villamil and José Joaquín de Olmedo.

León de Febres Cordero, Luis Urdaneta and Miguel de Letamendi, of Venezuelan origin, belonged to the Numancia Battalion but for their ideals in favor of emancipatory revolutions they were expelled and sent to their homeland. The ship, which was destined to disembark in Venezuela, arrived in Guayaquil and remained there for several weeks, during which time the military met several leaders of the idea of making the province of Guayaquil independent.

On October 1, 1820, Villamil and Antepara visit the house of Pedro Morlás, and after a conversation in which they expose their ideals, Isabela Morlás, daughter of the host, proposes the organization of a dance, to which they agree and this would be organized by Doña Ana Garaycoa de Villamil, wife of José de Villamil.

Both Antepara and Villamil saw the young woman's request as the perfect pretext to shape a revolution that would end dependency on Spain, which is why they invited several characters who shared their independence ideals, including José Joaquín de Olmedo, Gregorio Escobedo, second in command of the Spanish garrison, Dr. Luis Fernando Vivero, Francisco de Paula Lavayen, José Rivas, Manuel de Fajardo, José Correa and the Venezuelans Febres Cordero, Urdaneta and Letamendi.

On the night of Sunday, October 1, and after the meeting to which the most prestigious families of the city were invited, the host José de Villamil gathered the guests that he and Antepara considered vital for the triumph of emancipation. That meeting would be known as the "La Fragua de Vulcano" (in Spanish: The Forge of Vulcano) and it is the night in which the uprising plan of several royalist barracks began to be designed.

=== Organization and planning ===
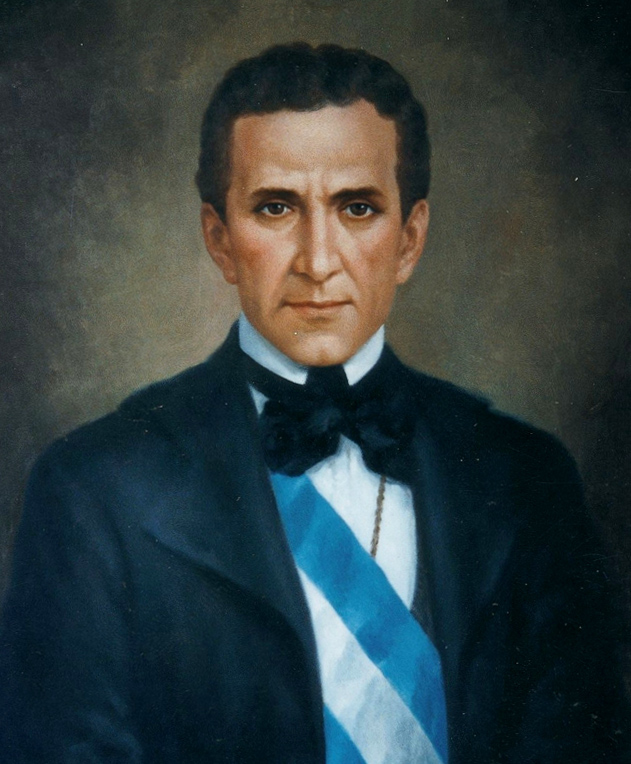
José Joaquín de Olmedo

On Monday, October 2, both Escobedo and Peña, who were respectively leaders of the "Granaderos de Reserva del Cuzco" and "Milicias" battalions, ratified their adherence to the independence cause, met at Villamil's house. Even though they saw their attempts to fold the soldiers of the "Artillery Squad" and those of the "Daule" cavalry battalion in favor of the cause, since their leaders were Spanish, they did not rule out the possibility of convincing their members, through the intervention of sergeants Álvarez Vargas and Pavón, supporters of the cause.

On the other hand, a leader was sought for the revolution, for which Colonel Jacinto Bejarano was first proposed and then Lieutenant Colonel José Carbo y Unzueta, however, José Joaquín de Olmedo was later considered. Discarding the first two for various and justified reasons, Villamil was commissioned to visit Olmedo.

The next day, Tuesday, October 3, after Villamil visited Olmedo's house and the movement's leadership proposal, Olmedo declined this assignment, pointing out that this position should be occupied by a man-at-arms, and being a poet, he could contribute little. However, he made clear his total sympathy for the revolution and his willingness to help in any way necessary. In a new meeting with Villamil, Colonel Rafael Ximena was considered, who would be consulted by Villamil the next day.

On Wednesday, October 4, Ximena, who despite sympathizing with emancipatory ideas, excuses herself and rejects Villamil's proposal because she owes her education to the crown, being himself of noble descent, for which he actively participates as leader of the movement, was seen by him as a betrayal to the land of his elders to the country in which he followed the arms race. That same day, the participation of Captain Damián Nájera of the "Daule" Cavalry Squadron was obtained.

On Thursday, October 5, the spirits of several of the members of the movement were overshadowed by various factors. León de Febres Cordero, fearful that those committed to the cause might be discouraged, launched a speech in which, among other things, he said: "In the name of America, I beg you, comrades, not to let such a favorable opportunity slip by to do it a great service by launching right now the province of Guayaquil to the revolution". After this Febres Cordero took a certain leadership.

On Friday, October 6, Villamil spoke with Francisco Loro, co-owner of the schooner "Alcance" with Manuel Antonio de Luzárraga, asking him to slightly delay the ship's departure to Panama, pending the outcome of the action that is about to be carried out. After Loro's acceptance, he visited Luzárraga, from whom he also obtained an affirmative answer, but without telling him the whole truth so as not to hurt him sensitively, since he was Spanish. This is how he asked him to delay the departure of Loro, who was the captain of the ship so that he could attend the reception that he would give at his home on October 8, to celebrate his appointment as Attorney General.

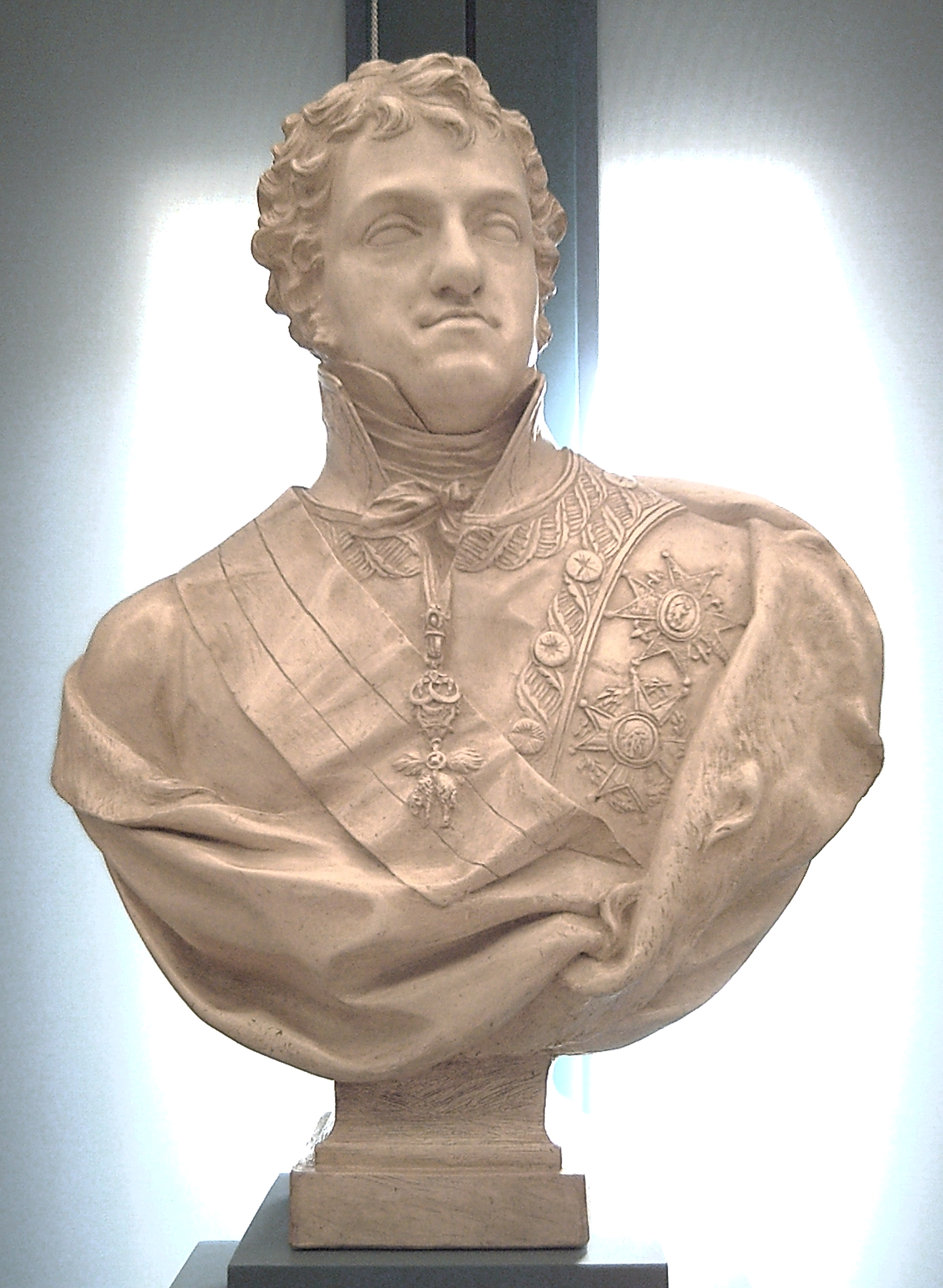
Official bust of King Ferdinand VII of Spain, by Francisco Elías Vallejo (San Fernando Royal Academy of Fine Arts, Madrid)

Some concern was felt among the independentistas, on Saturday, October 7, due to the rumor that Father Querejasú of the Church of San Francisco had alerted Don Pascual Vivero about the revolution in the making. This fact separated the plotters into two bands; the first in favor of carrying out the revolution as quickly as possible, and the second, inclined to wait for a more propitious occasion after things calm down. Febres-Cordero belonged to the first group, who once again tipped the scales in his favor. After the harangue, the revolution speeded up its march, and it was decided to hold a final meeting on Sunday the 8th at Villamil's house in the afternoon, taking advantage of the reception offered on that day.

Finally, on Sunday, October 8, 1820, all the plotters met at 4 in the afternoon. After an hour and a half, a clarion call was heard corresponding to the call of the officers of the "Reserve Grenadiers of Cuzco." Escobedo ordered that Captain Vargas attend the call, and he returned with the respective report. After a few moments they learned that a war meeting had been held at Governor Vivero's house, it was decided to take measures in case the rumors had any foundation, so the squad was formed on the boardwalk. However, the mood weakened, when it seems that the plans had to change substantially. The officers go to the "Granaderos", and the three Venezuelans left to capture impressions on the street and return. The fears receded when they saw that the "Grenadiers" went shortly to his barracks and Escobedo returned to Villamil at 10:30 at night to announce that everything was ready and arranged, and that at two in the tomorrow they would meet in their barracks where a large number of supporters of the cause would gather. When Escobedo said goodbye, he assured Villamil that the victory would be total, adding that no drop of blood would be shed, since there would be no one to fight with.

The heroes of the Independence of Guayaquil, for the most part, were Freemasons belonging to the Star Lodge of Guayaquil. These and the foreign heroes joined in a Lodge of Occasion called Fragua de Vulcano, gathered in the Campaign Temple in the house of Villamil, who gave the name by which the Guayaquil deed would be remembered.

== Revolution of October 9, 1820 ==
The number of royalist army troops stationed in the city was approximately 1,500, distributed as follows: 600 soldiers from the Cuzco Reserve Grenadiers battalion, 500 from the Daule cavalry squad, 200 from the Urban Militias battalion, 200 the Artillery Brigades, and 350 soldiers in the 7 gunboats that remained on the boardwalk. However, the officers who had folded in favor of the movement were Gregorio Escobedo and Hilario Álvarez from the Granaderos, Damián Nájera from the Artillery Brigade, José Peña from the Urban Militias battalion, and finally Sergeants Vargas and Pavón from the Daule cavalry with which 70% of the troops in the square were assured.

Consequently, the maneuvers had to tend to take the Daule cavalry squadron and the weapons and explosives warehouse of the artillery brigade, nullifying at the same time the reaction capacity of the troops that accompanied both Joaquín Magallar, commander of the Grenadiers, and to Benito García del Barrio, first chief of the Cuzco Reserve Grenadier Battalion. They would not worry about the men of the torpedo boats captained by Joaquín Villalba, since they had been outside the port the day before, and there was an opportunity to solve this problem if the revolution was crowned with success. Everything went as planned.

On the night of Sunday the 8th and early morning of Monday the 9th of October, captains León de Febres Cordero and Damián Nájera tricked the Spanish commander Torres Valdivia into Nájera's house under the pretext of inviting him to a game of cards. Once there, they subdued him and temporarily held him captive, explaining that it was the only way to prevent him from intervening against the independence movement and, given the respect they held for him, they had preferred to avoid a dangerous confrontation with him. Febres Cordero, owner of the keys to the Torres Valdivia park, went to the Granaderos, where, with 50 men, he went to the Artillery Brigade, and after surprising and locking up the guard officer, he seized the premises. The troop was formed, acclaiming the revolutionary cause.

While this was happening, Urdaneta, with 25 men from the Granaderos and new young people from Guayaquil, plus the complicity of sergeants Vargas and Pavón, took over the Daule cavalry squadron, but not without first fighting Magallar and his men, who upon realizing what happened tried to prevent it, dying in the confrontation. After this action, the Venezuelan captain Luis Urdaneta sent the commander Matías Tirapeguí, who had folded in favor of the movement, towards the Las Cruces Battery, with half of the cavalry squadron, with the purpose of taking it.

The last fire took place in the house of Colonel Benito García del Barrio, first chief of the Reserve Grenadier Battalion, who was arrested by Lieutenant Hilario Álvarez while he was sleeping.

By the morning of October 9, 1820, the city of Guayaquil had achieved its independence from Spain. José Joaquín Olmedo assumed the political command and Gregorio Escobedo the military command of the province. With this began the war of independence of what is now the Republic of Ecuador.

== Signatories of the Declaration of Independence ==
Characters who signed the act of independence on October 9, 1820

- Carlos Acevedo (Colonel from Guayaquil).
- Manuel Ignacio Aguirre (Spanish).
- Francisco Xavier de Aguirre Cepeda (born in Baba).
- Cristóbal Alarcón y Guzmán (Sergeant Major from Daul).
- Jose Joaquin Alarcon.
- Bernardo Alzua and Lamar (Spanish).
- Hilario Álvarez (Peruvian-Cusco Lieutenant Colonel).
- Esteban José de Amador and Rodríguez Funges (merchant from Cartagena de Indias).
- Manuel José Amador and Sotomayor Luna (Guayaquil son of the former).
- José María de Antepara y Arenaza (Guayaquil merchant).
- Juan de Antepara y Bejarano (Guayaquil lieutenant).
- Juan de Dios Arauzo (arequipeño lieutenant).
- Mariano Arcia (Panamanian doctor).
- Jose Arellano.
- José Ramón de Arrieta y Echegaray (Spanish bureaucrat).
- Manuel Avilés y Pacheco (merchant and sub-lieutenant from Guayaquil).
- Juan de Avilés y Carbo (Guayaquileño).
- José Gabriel de Avilés y Vidal (born in Baba).
- Miguel Mamerto Aviles.
- Fernando Ayarza (Panamanian military).
- Jacinto Bejarano y Lavayen (merchant and colonel from Guayaquil).
- Dr. Pedro de Benvente (Peruvian-Arequipan priest).
- José Francisco Benítes y Franco (Guayaquil lieutenant).
- Luis Benítes y Franco (Guayaquileño deputy lieutenant).
- Juan María Bernal (Guayaquileño).
- Guillermo Bodero y Franco (general from Guayaquil).
- Friar Pedro Bou.
- Mariano Briceno.
- Antolin Bustina (captain).
- Carlos Calisto and Borja (Quiteño).
- Abdón Calderón Garaycoa (sub-lieutenant from Cuenca).
- José Carbo Unzueta (Colonel from Guayaquil).
- Mariano Carbo (representative of Santa Elena).
- Jose Camargo.
- Miguel Carter.
- Jose M. Caicedo.
- Juan José Casilari y González (Guayaquil).
- Miguel de Casilari y González (Guayaquileño brother of the above).
- Francisco Casanova (Guayaquileño).
- Francisco de Camba y Garaycoa (Guayaquileño participated in Huachi)
- Mariano Cevallos (manabita, elector of Portoviejo).
- Manuel Cevallos.
- Santiago Cepeda (Guayaquil captain).
- Dr. Bernabé Cornejo y Avilés (Guayaquil lawyer).
- Jose Cornejo.
- José de la Cruz Correa (Guayaquil journalist).
- Fray Miguel Cumplido (Spanish, Mercedarian priest).
- Sebastián Antonio Delgado y Cortejada (Panamanian doctor).
- Juan Francisco de Elizalde y Lamar (Colonel from Guayaquil).
- Antonio Elizalde y Lamar (Guayaquileño general, brother of the previous one).
- Gregorio Escobedo and Rodríguez de Olmedo (Peruvian-Arequipa Colonel).
- Lorenzo Espinoza (interior merchant).
- José Antonio de Espantoso y Avellan (Guayaquileño).
- Vicente de Espantoso y Avellán (Guayaquil lawyer).
- Antonio Farfán (Peruvian-Cuzco general).
- Dionicio Farfan.
- Manuel Fajardo (dauleño soldier).
- Jose Maria Fajardo.
- León de Febres Cordero and Oberto (Venezuelan lieutenant colonel).
- Esteban de Febres Cordero y Oberto (Venezuelan lawyer and cousin of the former).
- Gabriel Fernández de Urbina (Spanish bureaucrat).
- Juan Barno de Ferrusola (Spanish military).
- Juan de Dios Florencia (Second Lieutenant from Guayaquil).
- Vicente Franco and Malo (Guayaquileño).
- Luis Franco and Rodríguez Plaza (Guayaquileño).
- Agustín Franco Herrera (Guayaquil colonel).
- Gabriel García Gómez (Spanish bureaucrat and father of Gabriel García Moreno).
- Baltazar García y de la Rocha (Colonel from Guayaquil).
- Lorenzo de Garaycoa y Llaguno (Colonel from Guayaquil).
- José de Garaycoa and Llaguno (Guayaquileño).
- Vicente González y Rodríguez (Colombian colonel).
- Gabino Gonzalez.
- José de Gorostiza y Garzón (Guayaquileño).
- Miguel Guerrero.
- José Pío Gutiérrez y Atencio (Guayaquileño).
- Manuel José de Herrera y Lavayen (Guayaquileño).
- José Hilario de Indaburu y Jijón (Colonel from Guayaquil).
- Miguel de Isusi Lescano (Guayaquileño).
- Rafael Jimena y Larrabeta (Guayaquil lieutenant colonel).
- Francisco de Paula Lavayen y Muguerza (Colonel from Guayaquil).
- Agustín de Lavayen y Muguerza (Colonel from Guayaquil, brother of the former).
- Miguel de Lavayen y Muguerza (Guayaquil lieutenant colonel).
- Manuel de Lavayen and Muguerza (Guayaquil lieutenant).
- Gabriel de Lavayen y Puga (Guayaquileño, cousin of the above).
- Manuel de Lara and Ponce de León (Guayaquileño, representative of Daule).
- Juan Layana Duarte (Lieutenant Colonel from Samboro).
- Miguel de Letamendi (Venezuelan colonel).
- José Felipe de Letamendi (Venezuelan captain).
- Manuel Loro (Spanish, captain of the Schooner Alcance).
- José Joaquín Loboguerrero (Spanish bureaucrat).
- José Lopéz Merino and Moreno de Acosta (a Riobambeño bureaucrat).
- Manuel Antonio de Luzarraga y Echezuria (merchant and Spanish soldier).
- José Leocadio de Llona y Rivera (Guayaquil lawyer).
- Manuel de Llona y Rivera (military man from Guayaquil, brother of the former).
- Francisco de Marcos y Crespo (Guayaquil lawyer).
- José Antonio de Marcos y Crespo (priest and lawyer from Guayaquil, brother of the above).
- José María Maldonado y Torres (lawyer from Loja).
- Diego Manrique (Guayaquil captain).
- José Antonio de Marticorena y Puga (doctor and priest from Guayaquil).
- Manuel Mármol y Pineda (Guayaquileño).
- Nicolás Antonio Martínez (Guayaquileño).
- José Mariscal y Núñez (Guayaquileño).
- Juan Melendez.
- José Ramón Menéndez (Guayaquileño).
- Manuel Menendez.
- Pablo de Mendiola and Fernández Caballero (Guayaquileño).
- Pablo Merino (Guayaquil lawyer).
- Rafael Merino y Ortega (Guayaquileño military).
- Guillermo Merino y Ortega (Colonel from Guayaquil).
- Joaquin Medranda (Manabite).
- Carlos Morán Iturralde (Guayaquileño).
- Pedro Morlás (Venezuelan bureaucrat).
- John of God Molina.
- Manuel María Montblanc (Venezuelan colonel).
- Ramon Moncayo.
- Manuel J. Murillo (Guayaquileño).
- Juan Najar and Murillo (Guayaquil captain).
- Jose Maria y Narvaez.
- Diego Noboa and Arteta (Guayaquil).
- José Joaquín de Olmedo (Guayaquil lawyer).
- Manuel Otoya and Sánchez Navarrete (Guayaquileño).
- José Oyarvide (Spanish).
- Ramón Pacheco and Echeverría (Guayaquileño).
- Isidro Pavón (military).
- John Padilla.
- Bernardo Plaza de la Tejada (Guayaquileño, great-grandfather of Galo Plaza Lasso).
- Ambrosio de la Parra.
- Jose Maria Pena (Colonel).
- Francisco Javier Perez.
- John Perez.
- Jacinto Ponce de León y Espinoza (Guayaquileño).
- Manuel Ponce de León y Espinoza (Guayaquileño).
- José Joaquín Ponce de León y Espinoza (Guayaquileño, brother of the above).
- Sebastian Puga and Ayala.
- José Manuel Quevedo (interior lieutenant).
- Cayetano Ramírez y Fita (doctor and priest from Latacungueño).
- Manuel Ribadeneira (doctor and parish priest of Portoviejo).
- Justo Rivera (Peruvian lieutenant).
- Ignatius Rivera.
- Miguel Jerónimo de Rivera and Arizcun Elizondo (born in Baba).
- José Rivas (Guayaquileño).
- Ciriaco Robles y García (Lieutenant from Guayaquil).
- Francisco María Roca Rodríguez (Guayaquil merchant).
- Vicente Ramón Roca Rodríguez (Guayaquil merchant).
- Pedro José Roca y Rodríguez (Colonel from Guayaquil, brother of the above).
- Gregory Rock.
- Fulgencio Rocha (Guayaquil captain).
- José Rodayega and Olabarri (Spanish).
- Antonio Salazar (Guayaquileño second lieutenant).
- Manuel Salcedo (Second Lieutenant from Guayaquil).
- Pedro Santander y Peña (Guayaquil).
- Gaspar de Santistevan (Guayaquileño).
- Sunday of Santistevan and Carbo (Guayaquileño).
- José Mata de Santistevan y Noboa (Guayaquil lawyer).
- José Mateo Santistevan (Guayaquil lieutenant colonel).
- Pedro Sanchez.
- Ambrosio Sánchez Layno (Guayaquileño soldier).
- Narciso Sanchez.
- Ramón Sobenes (Panamanian).
- Jose Maria Samper.
- Jeronimo Santa Cruz (Bogota).
- Jose Secundino.
- Mariano Soto (Second Lieutenant from Guayaquil).
- Manuel Tama and Rodríguez Plaza (Guayaquileño).
- Francisco Tejada (Second Lieutenant from Guayaquil).
- Bacilli Tirsio.
- Angel de Tola y Salcedo (Guayaquil bureaucrat).
- Francisco de Ugarte and Rodríguez Plaza (Guayaquileño military).
- Luis Urdaneta Farias (Venezuelan lieutenant colonel).
- Manuel Vargas (Peruvian military).
- Jose Vargas.
- Francisco Valverde Cassaus (Colonel from Guayaquil).
- Jose Vallejo.
- Ignacio Velez.
- Andrés Vera (manabita).
- José María de Villamil y Joly (merchant and soldier from New Orleans).
- Luis Fernando de Vivero y Toledo (Pujilí's lawyer).
- Juan Antonio de Vivero y Toledo (bureaucrat born in Pujilí).
- Isidro Viteri and Gómez Cornejo (Guayaquil captain).
- Miguel Viteri and Gómez Cornejo (priest from Guayaquil).
- Jerónimo Zerda y Chávez (Panamanian).

== Consequences ==
=== Free Province of Guayaquil ===
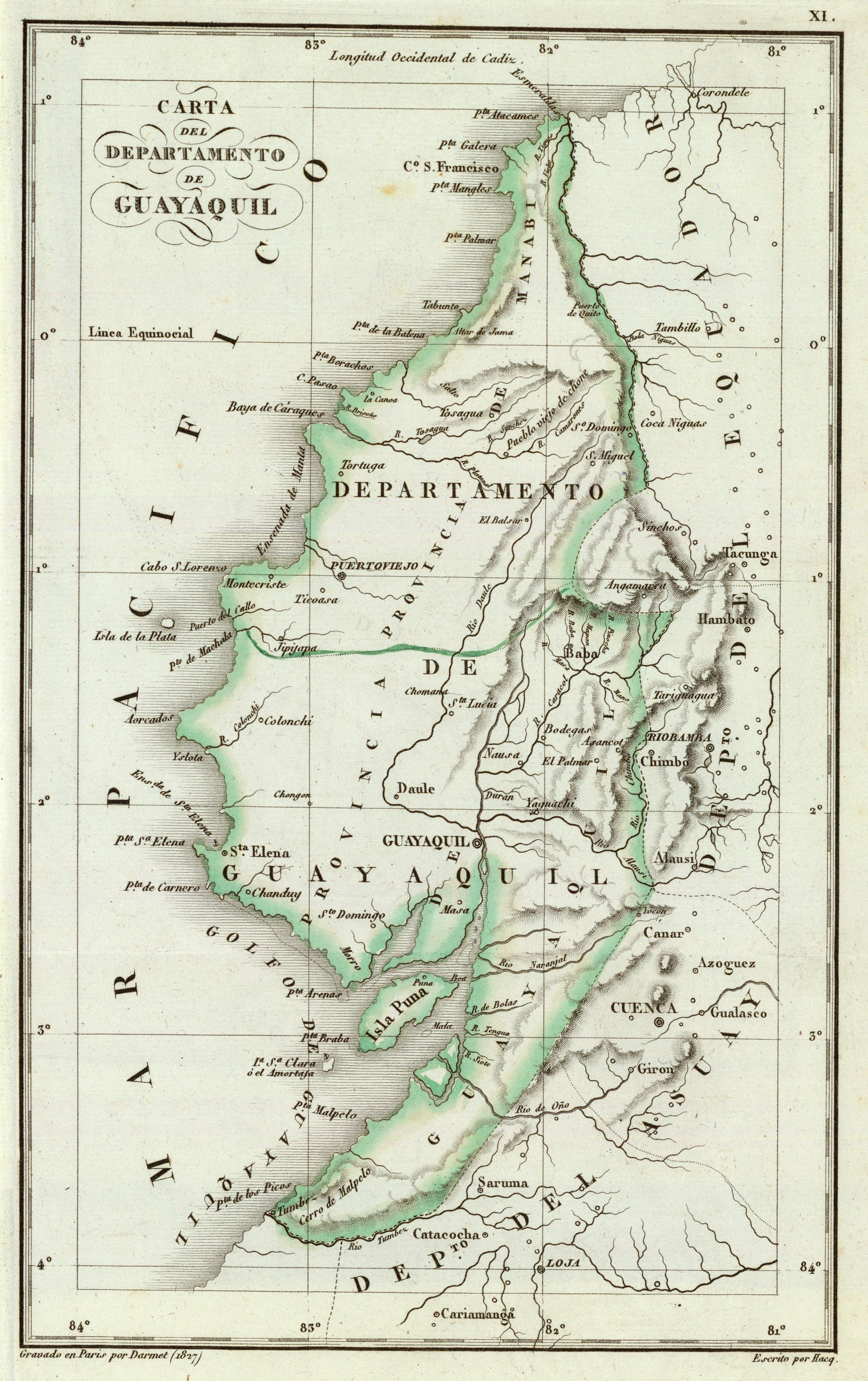
Territorial extension of the Free Province of Guayaquil later integrated into Gran Colombia.

After the revolution of October 9, 1820, the city of Guayaquil was freed from Spanish rule, but not its province. The independence of several towns were quickly achieved, such as Samborondón on October 10, Daule on October 11, and Naranjal on October 15.

On October 14, José de Villamil was commissioned to report the liberating feat to the commander in chief of the liberating expedition of Peru, José de San Martín, who was in the north of Peru, or to the vice-admiral commander of the liberating squadron, Lord Cochrane, who was with his fleet somewhere in the Pacific. Villamil found Cochrane on the 31st anchored in the Bay of Ancón and the following day he was presented to the liberator San Martín. Upon his return, Villamil took carbines and ammunition, as well as Colonel Luzuriaga to command the army of Guayaquil, as San Martín's support for the revolution.

On November 8, 1820, 57 representatives of all the towns that made up the province of Guayaquil were summoned to City Hall, where the birth of a new state known as the Free Province of Guayaquil was proclaimed, and Dr. José Joaquín de Olmedo elected as president. Following this, the Provisional Government Regulation was issued, which served as the constitution for the nascent state.

However, the towns of Quito and Cuenca were still under Spanish rule and this could mean danger for the independence recently achieved by Guayaquil. This is how Olmedo created an army called the Protective Division of Quito, which would be in charge of ensuring the security of the Free Province of Guayaquil and making the other towns that made up the Real Audiencia of Quito independent.

=== Southern Campaigns of Gran Colombia ===
The Protective Division of Quito began a campaign with the objective of making the Free Province of Guayaquil completely independent, thus obtaining a victory in the Battle of Camino Real, but soon found itself in a delicate military situation after the Guayaquileños were defeated in the First Battle of Huachi and the Battle of Tanizagua. José Joaquín Olmedo requested military help from the commander in chief of the liberating expedition of Peru, José de San Martín, and from Gran Colombia in order to defend the city and liberate the Real Audiencia of Quito.

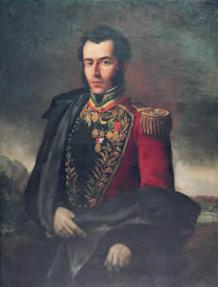
Antonio José de Sucre

Bolívar sent his best general, Antonio José de Sucre, in early 1821 to Guayaquil to replace General José Mires. Sucre arrived on May 6, 1821, with some 650 Colombian soldiers, to which he added some 1,400 Guayaquil residents. Sucre's instructions were to take command of the troops that were in Guayaquil, to ensure the incorporation of the province into Colombia, and to prepare, in conjunction with the Liberator, the operations that would liberate Quito.

Sucre signed an agreement between the Guayaquil government and placed his troops in Samborondón and Babahoyo to block the royalists from entering the province. On July 17, 1821, an anti-Colombian and pro-royalist rebellion occurred that was successfully repressed. When the royalists learned of the rebellion, they prepared to support it. Governor Aymerich marched south with 2,000 men, while Colonel González headed from Cuenca to Guayaquil, threatening the communications of Sucre, who was on his way to fight Aymerich. Sucre, aware of the movement, retreated to confront González and killed him on August 19 at the Battle of Yaguachi.

The victory obtained in the battle of Yaguachi allowed to preserve the independence of the province of Guayaquil. Sucre and the Guayaquil army pursued the royalists a long way north but were defeated in the Second Battle of Huachi, forcing a wounded Sucre to return to the coast in a precarious situation and sign an armistice between the independentistas and the royalists on November 18, 1821.

The promise of help from the liberator José de San Martín from Peru would not take long. The Peruvian expeditionary division under the command of Colonel Andrés de Santa Cruz, met to form the United Liberation Army in Saraguro at the beginning of February 1822, together with the troops of Gran Colombia de Sucre and a battalion from Guayaquil, finally triumphing in the battle of Pichincha on May 24, 1822. With this battle, the independence of the Province of Guayaquil was assured along with the entire territory of the Real Audiencia of Quito, present-day Ecuador.

== See also ==
- Protectorate of Peru

== Bibliography ==
- Avilés Pino, Efrén (2002). Historia del Ecuador. Guayaquil: Diario El Universo (fascículos).
- Ayala Mora, Enrique (1995). Nueva historia del Ecuador. Corporación Editora Nacional. ISBN 978-9978-84-001-6.
- Briceño Perozo, Mario (1970). Historia bolivariana. Caracas: Ministerio de Educación.
- Correa Bustamante, José (2002). Todo Guayas en sus manos. Guayaquil: Editorial Justicia y Paz.
- Destruge, Camilo (1920). Biografía del General Don León de Febres Cordero. Guayaquil: Imprenta municipal.
- Ediciones Castell (1981). Diccionario Enciclopédico Hachette Castell Tomo 2. Barcelona: Printer Industria Gráfica. ISBN 84-7489-156-6.
- Ediciones Castell (1981). Diccionario Enciclopédico Hachette Castell Tomo 3. Barcelona: Printer Industria Gráfica. ISBN 84-7489-157-4.
- Muñoz, Julio H. (1949). Doctrinas militares aplicadas en el Ecuador: Historia y pedagogía militar. Quito.
- Oña Villareal, Humberto (1988). Fechas históricas y hombres notables del Ecuador. Guayaquil.
- Villamil, José de; Abel Romeo Castillo (1983). La independencia de Guayaquil: 9 de octubre de 1820. Guayaquil: Banco Central del Ecuador.
