= Luis Urdaneta =

Venezuelan revolutionary (1768–1831)

Luis Urdaneta Farías
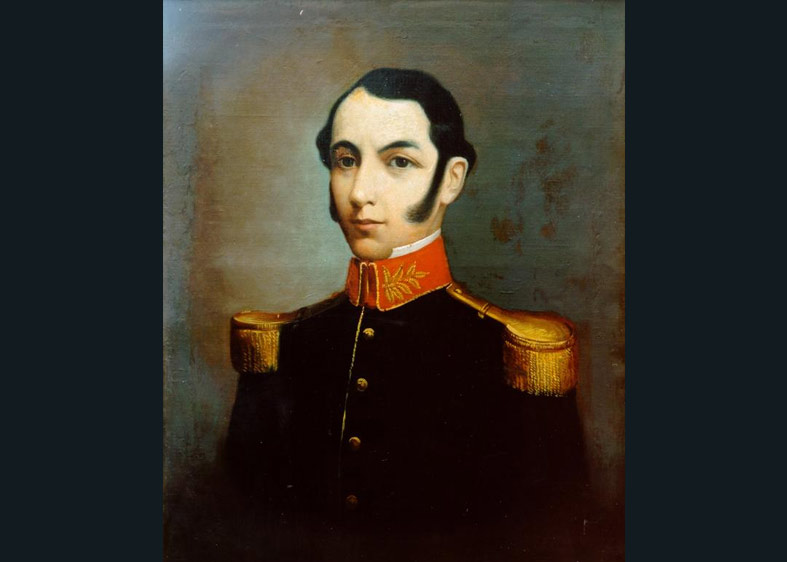
- Born: October 24, 1768 Maracaibo, Venezuela, Spain
- Died: August 27, 1831 Panama, New Granada
- Allegiance: Spanish Empire; Guayaquil; Colombia
- Rank: General
- Conflicts: Spanish American Wars of Independence: October 9 Revolution; Peruvian War of Independence; Venezuelan War of Independence; Gran Colombia–Peru War: Battle of Tarqui

Luis Urdaneta Farías (Maracaibo, October 24, 1768 — Panama, August 27, 1831) was a Venezuelan soldier and revolutionary who participated in several military campaigns of the Spanish American Wars of Independence. Initially part of the troops loyal to the Spanish Empire, he switched sides during the conflict. He participated and played a leading role in the independence of Guayaquil. He fought in several battles under the command of Marshal Antonio José de Sucre in the Southern Campaign and in the Gran Colombia–Peru War. He insurrectioned against Juan José Flores' attempted separation of the Southern District from Gran Colombia.

== Early life ==
He was born in the city of Maracaibo in 1768, and was the son of José de Urdaneta Barrenechea y Troconís, and Francisca Farías, therefore the nephew of General Rafael Urdaneta. Coming from a wealthy family, he easily entered as a cadet in the White Militia Battalion of Maracaibo, where he began his military career. Due to his great performance, he was later assigned to the distinguished Royalist First Battalion of Numancia, which in turn was destined to be stationed in Peru. However, in mid-1820, Spanish authorities in Lima discovered that Urdaneta sympathized with emerging independence ideas and separated him from the battalion, forcing him to return to Venezuela along with his compatriots, Miguel de Letamendi and León de Febres Cordero, who had been expelled for the same reasons.

== Military career ==
=== Quito and Peru ===
The Anglo–American brig Tiber, which was carrying the three deported Venezuelans from the Numancia Battalion, arrived in the city of Guayaquil with a stopover and remained there for several days. Urdaneta, along with his compatriots, made friends with several local residents who shared their ideas on independence. José de Antepara invited the three Venezuelans to a party at José de Villamil's house on October 1, 1820, which masked a secret meeting of an emancipatory conspiracy called the Forge of Vulcano.

In the early morning of October 9, 1820, Urdaneta together with Lorenzo de Garaycoa, Francisco de Paula Lavayen, Antonio Elizalde Lamar and other volunteers went to the Daule Barracks, which was under the command of the royalist commander Joaquín Magallar. After taking control of the barracks, he headed to the Las Cruces battery, south of the city, to capture it. By the morning of October 9, Guayaquil achieved its independence.

After the revolution in Guayaquil, the first Government Junta was established, Urdaneta was promoted to the rank of lieutenant colonel and was appointed commander of the troops of the Free Province of Guayaquil, with the objective of safeguarding the emancipation and planning future campaigns against the royalists in the Ecuadorian mountains. The forces of the Protective Division of Quito, led by the newcomers Urdaneta and Febres Cordero, achieved victory in the Battle of Camino Real (November 9), but suffered a serious defeat in the First Battle of Huachi (November 22) and they blamed Peruvian Major Hilario Álvarez for their defeat, but after the trial he was later released from the charges and the responsibility for poor command fell on commanders Urdaneta and Febres Cordero. The arrival of General Antonio José de Sucre to Guayaquil served to regroup the Guayaquil forces with Colombian support. Urdaneta signed up again as a junior officer. He participated in the battle of Pichincha, on May 24, 1822, and then continued under the command of Sucre through the campaign in Peru, taking part in the battle of Junín and the occupation of Lima.

=== Gran Colombia and Ecuador ===
After South America's total independence from Spanish rule, Urdaneta obtained the rank of general. Still under the orders of Sucre, he participated in the battle of Portete de Tarqui, in the middle of the Gran Colombia–Peru War, in which Marshal Sucre entrusted him with the mission of harassing the most advanced points of the Peruvians who had arrived in the fields of Tarqui. The mission was successful, in which he fiercely attacked the Peruvians, forcing them to retreat to the town of Saraguro, which he set on fire for assisting the Peruvian invasion.

By 1830, the Venezuelan general Juan José Flores began the separation of the Southern District of Gran Colombia, from which the State of Ecuador would later be born. On November 28, Urdaneta rose up against Flores, seeking support from battalions located in Guayaquil and Samborondón. On December 2, he began, together with Villamil, the insurrections in the Andean mountains against Flores, in pursuit of Gran-Colombian ideals, even confronting Flores near the city of Ambato. However, after learning of the death of the liberator Simón Bolívar, Urdaneta laid down his arms.

After finishing his insurrection, General Flores provided him with an escort that would take him to Puná Island, and from there he sailed by sea to Panama City. Shortly after arriving in Panama he participated in a revolutionary movement to separate Panama from the rest of Colombia, which failed. Urdaneta was captured and subsequently shot on August 27, 1831.

== See also ==
- October 9 Revolution
- History of Ecuador (1830–1860)
