= Villamil (surname) =

Villamil is a surname. Notable people with the surname include:

- Federico Cantero Villamil (1874–1946), Spanish civil engineer
- Jorge Villamil Cordovez (1929–2010), Colombian composer and songwriter
- José de Villamil (1789–1866), leader of Ecuador and first governor of the Galápagos Islands
- Martin de Villamil (1783–1843), Ecuadorian trader, brother of José
- Richard de Villamil (1850–1936), British scientist, grandson of Martin
- Silvia Rodríguez Villamil (1939–2003), Uruguayan historian, feminist, writer, and activist
- Soledad Villamil, Argentine actress

Villaamil

- Fernando Villaamil (1845–1898), Spanish naval officer
- Jenaro Pérez Villaamil (1807–1854), Spanish painter
- Polo Villaamil (born 1979), Spanish racing driver
