= First Battle of Huachi =

Part of the Ecuadorian War of Independence

- Part of the Ecuadorian War of Independence
| Date | 22 November 1820 |
| Location | near Ambato, Ecuador 1°18′24″S 78°38′06″W |
| Result | Royalist victory |

Belligerents
| Free Province of Guayaquil | Kingdom of Spain |

Commanders and leaders
| León de Febres-Cordero; Luis Urdaneta | Francisco Tamariz; Francisco González |

Strength
| 1,800 men | 1,000 men |

Casualties and losses
| 500 killed and wounded many prisoners | Unknown |

The First Battle of Huachi was the second battle in the Ecuadorian War of Independence, that took place on 22 November 1820 near Ambato, Ecuador. The battle was fought between Royalist soldiers in support of the Spanish Empire, and the Patriot forces of the Free Province of Guayaquil, who suffered a serious defeat.

== Background ==
In 1820, Patriots in Guayaquil had organized the successful October 9 Revolution, which led to the establishment of the Free Province of Guayaquil. The Guayaquil revolutionaries wanted to liberate the rest of the Royal Audiencia of Quito and had raised an army that marched to the capital Quito.
After their victory at the Battle of Camino Real on 9 November 1820, Guayaquil's troops advanced further from Guaranda, entering the inter-Andean valley to the north towards Quito. However, the Royalists had regrouped and awaited the Patriot army in the central highlands of Ecuador in the Huachi sector, outside the town of Ambato, in today's Tungurahua province.

== The battle ==
Despite having been reinforced with the veteran "Aragón” battalion under command of Colonel Francisco González, the Royalists were still outnumbered, but had a more experienced cavalry. In addition, the irregular terrain of Huachi, where the confrontation would take place, was to their advantage.

Once the battle began, the Patriots' poor decisions in the deployment of their troops, and the retreat of several elements of the inexperienced army, caused the ranks to break, which led to one of Guayaquil's worst defeats. The losses were significant: around 500 men were killed or wounded, a large number of combatants were taken prisoners, and three cannons, a large quantity of weapons, ammunition, supplies and horses also fell into the hands of the Spanish.

== Consequences ==
The defeat of Huachi meant for the troops of Guayaquil the retreat towards the south, which left the Royalists free to march towards the city of Cuenca, which had proclaimed its independence on 3 November, with the aim of further destabilizing the Patriot army and pushing them back towards the coast.
The Patriots suffered two more defeats: at Verdeloma (20 December 1820) and Tanizahua (3 January 1821). The odds would only turn later in 1821 with the help of Gran Colombia.

== Sources ==
- Haz te ver Ecuador
- Efrén Aviles Pino. "Batalla de Huachi". Enciclopedia del Ecuador.
