= Ana Villamil Icaza =

Ecuadorian composer

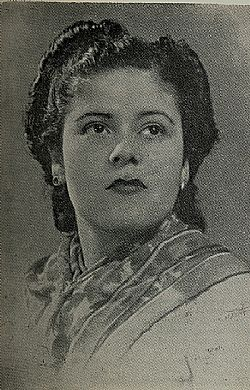
- Born: January 19, 1852; Guayaquil, Ecuador
- Died: October 23, 1916 (aged 64); Guayaquil, Ecuador
- Occupations: Composer, artist and teacher
- Parents: Francisco Villamil y Garaicoa (father); Isabel de Icaza y Paredes (mother)

Ana Villamil Icaza was born in Guayaquil, Ecuador (January 19, 1852) and died in Guayaquil, Ecuador (October 23, 1916). She was a composer, artist and a teacher of piano and singing.

== Biography ==
Ana was born to her father, Francisco Villamil y Garaicoa, and mother, Isabel María Icaiza y Paredes.Her father was the son of José de Villamil, an Ecuadorian Independence leader. Her mother Isabel was the daughter of Francisco de Paula Icaza and Isabel Paredes y Olmedo; niece of the poet Magdalena, and sister of José Joaquin de Olmedo.

Ana worked as music teacher at municipal schools in her hometown throughout her life. She lived in Guayaquil at "10 de Agosto and Chimborazo," which is now considered to be a historic site. She lived there until her death on October 23, 1916.

== Projects ==
Inspired by José Joaquin de Olmedo, she composed the music to "The hymn of Guayaquil," which was later recognized as The Guayaquil anthem.
