= Francisco Eugenio Tamariz =

Ecuadorian soldier and politician (1787–1880)

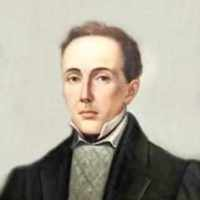

Minister of Finance
- In office 1834–1836
- Preceded by: Juan García del Río
- Succeeded by: Manuel López Escobar

Personal details
- Born: November 15, 1787 Seville, Spain
- Died: 1880 Cuenca, Ecuador

Military service
- Allegiance: Spanish Empire
- Years of service: 1796–1820
- Rank: Colonel
- Battles/wars: Peninsular War; October 9 Revolution; Gran Colombia–Peru War

Francisco Eugenio Tamariz y Gordillo (Seville, November 15, 1787 — Cuenca, 1880) was a Spanish-born Ecuadorian politician and soldier who served as Ecuador's Minister of Finance from 1834 to 1836.

== Biography ==
Born in Spain, he participated in the Spanish War of Independence against Napoleon's troops and traveled to America in 1812, as part of General Pablo Morillo's expedition. After occupying the Governorate of Popayán for a year, he participated in the First Battle of Huachi, where the Patriot armies were defeated, and settled in Cuenca.

When Mariscal de Campo Melchor Aymerich ordered him to march with his troops to support him, Tamariz was taken prisoner by the Patriot armies after the defeat at the Battle of Yaguachi (August 1821). General Antonio José de Sucre invited him to become a Colombian national, with the promise that he would not be forced to fight against the Spanish. Tamariz accepted, returned to Cuenca, and there married his fiancée Rosa García de Trelles.

He fought in the Gran Colombia–Peru War (1829) and as Ecuadorian, he took up various positions in the government, including Minister of Finance from 1834 to 1836.
