= Villaamil =

Villaamil (or Villamil) is a Spanish surname. Notable people with the surname include:

- Fernando Villaamil (1845–1898), Spanish naval officer
- Jenaro Pérez Villaamil (1807–1854), Spanish painter
- José María Díaz y Díaz Villaamil (1898–1936), Spanish Galician lawyer and politician
- Polo Villaamil (born 1979), Spanish racing driver

== See also ==
- Spanish destroyer Villaamil, a Spanish Navy destroyer in commission from 1916 to 1932
