= Antonio Fominaya =

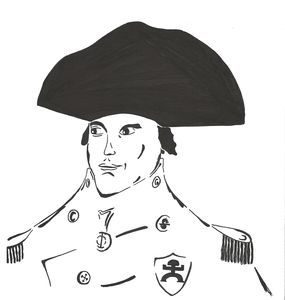
- Born: 3 November 1769; Mollet del Vallès, Kingdom of Spain
- Died: Unknown; Cúcuta, Gran Colombia
- Military career
- Service years: 1789–1820
- Rank: General of division
- Commands: Spanish Army
- Conflicts: Revolt of the Comuneros; Ecuadorian War of Independence; Battle of Camino Real; Colombian War of Independence

Antonio Fominoya (born in Mollet del Vallès, Spain, in 1769) was a Spanish soldier who served as the governor of Socorro and fought in the Ecuadorian War of Independence and in the Spanish reconquest of New Granada.

== Biography ==
He was born in the town of Moreto on November 3, 1769. His parents were José Fominaya and Tomasa García. Since he was little he had a strong attachment to military life joining the Corps Guard in 1789. He was transferred to the Americas, where he was surprised by the Napoleonic invasion of Spain and was tasked with crushing Patriot uprisings throughout Colombia, defeating Patriots like Antonio Galán in the process.

But the Royalist troops prevailed, so Fominoya was sent with his Corps to support the president of Quito Melchor Aymerich, when a rebellion broke out in Quito. The president ordered the colonel to advance with 500 men and destroy the rebels. The colonel engaged the rebels from the Free Province of Guayaquil, but was defeated in the Battle of Camino Real (November 1820).

After his defeat, president Aymerich sent his to Venezuela, responding to Pablo Morillo's request to send an ambassador from Quito. Colombia had fallen under the power of the Patriots in the Battle of Boyacá (August 1819), so Fominoya traveled to Venezuela the following year to discuss a peace treaty with Simón Bolívar. After this he would travel to Cúcuta where he announced his return to Spain.

He probably died before reaching Spain as this announcement was the last mention of him.
