= Martin de Villamil =

Felipe Martin de Villamil or Martin Villamil ("Gonzalez de la Galea y Villamil" or "Villamil Joly") (1783-1843) was a trader in the Caribbean and in Europe.

== In the Caribbeans ==
Martin de Villamil, brother of the Ecuadorian independence hero José de Villamil, was born in New Orleans, Spanish Louisiana, in 1783, son of a trader and administrator (mayordomo) of the hospital of the city. He became a trader in the Caribbean.

In 1809, he married the daughter of the lieutenant of the king of Spain in Panama (1). Around 1812, he was one of the cofounders of the trade consulate in Cartagena. Later, he lived in Jamaica, where he owned sugar cane plantations.

== In Europe ==
After that, Martin de Villamil and his family went to Europe: London, Paris, Italy (Bologna, Firenze). In 1820-1822, he welcomed in his villa of Sèvres, near Paris, the great Irish poet Thomas Moore (1779-1853).

In 1830, Martin Villamil met in Paris the général Francisco de Paula Santander (1792-1840), hero of the independence of Great Colombia.

In Bologna, he may have been a British consul. In Firenze, Madame Martin de Villamil, was a friend of Jérôme Bonaparte (brother of Napoléon Bonaparte), former king of Westphalia, who gave her the guard of his daughter, la princesse Mathilde, and of his house.

Martin de Villamil died in Paris in 1843.

== Sources ==
- Book : El general José de Villamil y la Independencia de Hispanoamerica, de Benjamin Rosales Valenzuela, Guayaquil, 11/2004.
- (1) about Martin de Villamil in Panama : El caso de Joaquin y Manuel Julian de Mier, by Joaquin Viloria de La Hoz, publications of the Banco de la Republica, in Cartagena, Colombia, 11/2000 : www.banrep.gov.co/docum/Pdf-econom-region/Cuadernos/CHEE07-Demier.pdf et ([www.banrep.gov.co/docum/Pdf-econom-region/Cuadernos/CHEE07-Demier.pdf]) et http://bdigital.binal.ac.pa/bdp/independencia2.pdf page 2 note 46 et ([1]).
- (2) about the creation of the consulate of Carthagena : http://bdigital.binal.ac.pa/bdp/independencia2.pdf, cuadro 8 page 29 ([2]) et aussi independancia4, page 33 ([3]).
- (3) about Martin de Villamil and Thomas Moore : life of Thomas Moore by William Rossetti. See : http://www.columbia.edu/itc/mealac/pritchett/00generallinks/lallarookh/intro_rossetti.html and
- (4) about the meeting with Santander (21 May 1830) : Diaro del viaje en Europa de F.P. Santander, on the site of the Banco de la Republica of Colombia : https://web.archive.org/web/20070611105813/http://www.lablaa.org/blaavirtual/historia/diagene/diagen3.doc and .
