= Saraguro Canton =

- Canton
- Location of Loja Province in Ecuador.

- Saraguro Canton in Loja Province
- Coordinates: 3.6253°S 79.2411°W
- Country: Ecuador
- Province: Loja Province

Area
  - Total: 1,085 km^{2} (419 sq mi)

Population (2022 census)
  - Total: 29,111
  - Density: 26.83/km^{2} (69.49/sq mi)
- Time zone: UTC-5 (ECT)

Saraguro (also Sarakuru) is a canton of Ecuador, located in Loja Province. Its capital is the town of Saraguro. The area of the canton is 1,085 square kilometres (419 sq mi). The capital of the canton is the parish and town of Saraguro.

== Demographics ==
The population of Saraguro Canton in the 2001 census was 28,029. In 2010 the population had increased to 30,183. A sizable percentage of the population is made up of the Saraguro people, an indigenous ethnic group whose members have retained much of their land and customs.

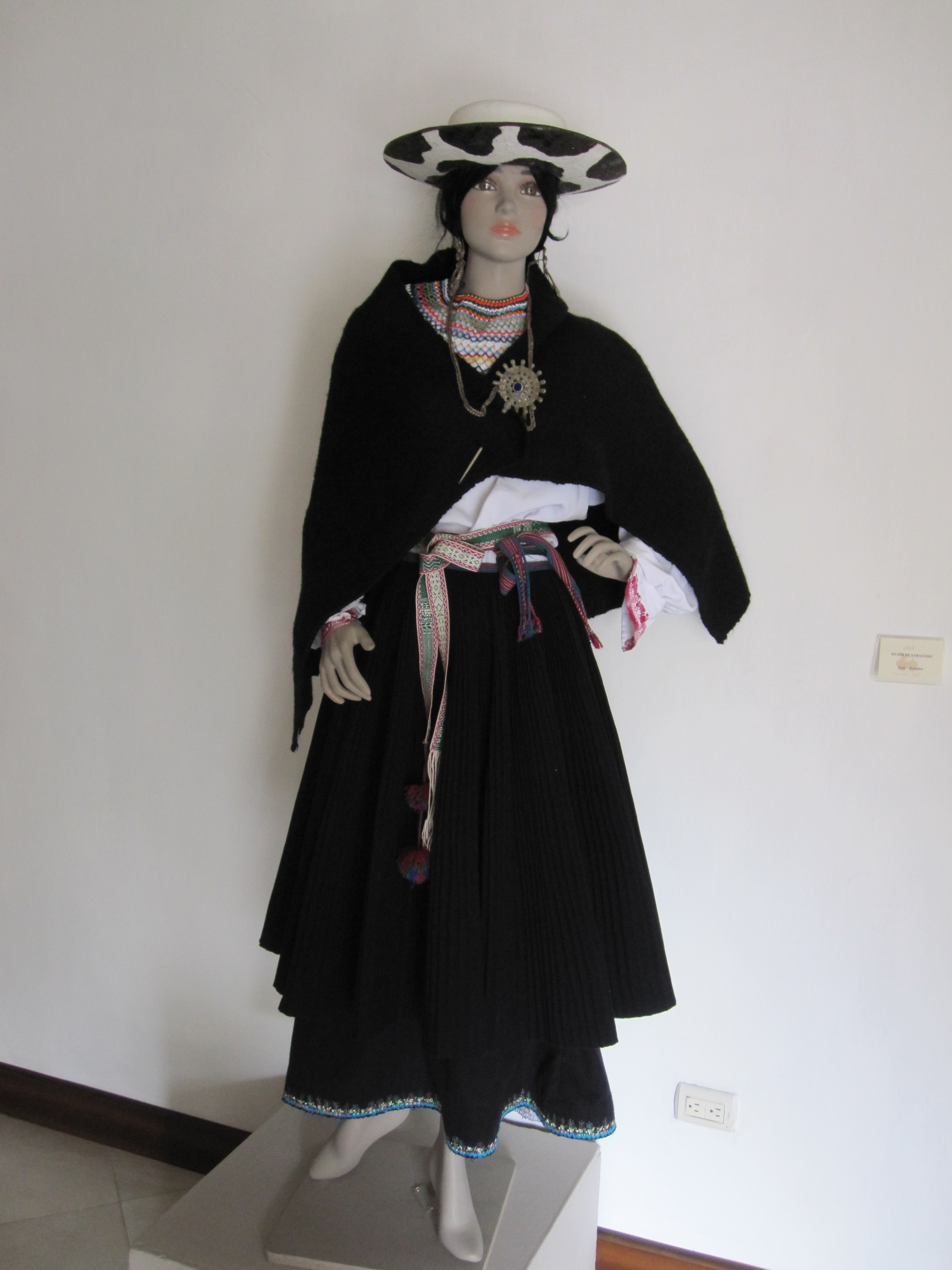
Traditional dress of Saraguro.

== Parishes ==
Saraguro canton is divided into ll parishes.

- Saraguro (capital)
- El Paraíso de Celen
- El Tablón
- Lluzhapa
- Manu
- San Antonio de Cumbe
- San Pablo de Tenta
- San Sebastián de Yuluc
- Selva Alegre
- Urdaneta (Paquishapa)
- Sumaypamba
