= José de Villamil =

Ecuadorian founding father and general

Don José Villamil
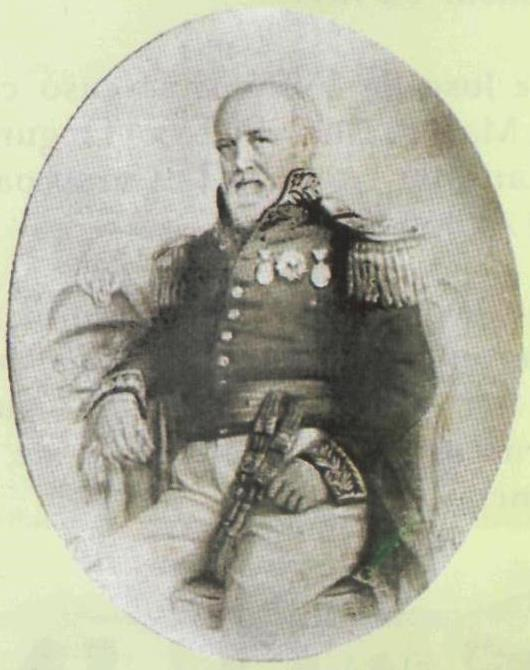
- In office Minister of Foreign Affairs and Human Mobility
- President: José María Urbina
- Preceded by: José Modesto Larrea
- Succeeded by: Juan Javier Espinosa

Personal details
- Born: José María de Villamil y Joly; June 10, 1788 Louisiana (New Spain)
- Died: May 12, 1866 (aged 77) Guayas, Ecuador
- Resting place: Cementerio General de Guayaquil
- Spouse: Ana Maria Juana Garaycoa Llaguno
- Children: Maria Bolivia Villamil Garaycoa; Francisco Villamil y Garaicoa
- Parent(s): Pedro González de la Galea y Villamil; Catherine Joly Lebrún
- Relatives: Felipe Martín de Villamil (brother)

Military service
- Allegiance: Louisiana; Colombia; Ecuador
- Branch/service: Army National Guard; Armed Forces of Ecuador
- Rank: Sergeant; General
- Unit: DuBourg's Battalion
- Battles/wars: Ecuadorian War of Independence; Spanish American wars of independence independence of Ecuador

José de Villamil or José Villamil born José María Villamil y Joly (1789–1866) was born in New Orleans, when Louisiana was a colony of Spain. He was one of the fathers of the independence of Ecuador, founder of its navy, "conqueror" and first Governor of the Galápagos Islands and Minister of Foreign Relations. The city of General Villamil Playas is named in honor of him. José de Villamil was the younger brother of Felipe Martin de Villamil (1783–1843).

== History ==
In 1803, Louisiana was sold to the United States by France. In 1804 seated place as Cadet of "Company of Rifles volunteers Louisiana" and then he was promoted to Sergeant. In 1810 he traveled to Spain recommended by his older brothers Felipe Martin and Pedro Villamil, was received paternally by General Ignacio Alava, Governor of Cadiz, who invited numerous "soire". The Governor's wife wanted to learn some dance steps and especially one called "L'Oiseleur" and Villamil taught it to her influence to obtain the release of several French officers who posed as luisianeses is not. The gentle lady Alava nicknamed him "Choctaw" Villamil symbolic name that kept the rest of his life. Cadiz also frequented distinguished American and entered the Masonic Lodge "Lautaro" in the company of Mexican Lorenzo de Velasco. The Argentinian Manuel de Sarratea asked: Are you able to consecrate to the American cause? 'We hugged and made the oath, he wrote years later to the king.

He immediately traveled to Maracaibo (Venezuela) where his brothers lived in good social and economic position. He wrote revolutionary letters intercepted by the Governor of Maracaibo and only thanks to influences escaped death by firing squad.

In 1811 he was in Guayaquil dedicated to trade and achieved huge profits. In 1813 he traveled to the United States and bought the schooner "Alcance" that brought loaded guns to sell to Viceroy Pezuela. It came with his widowed mother. That year he married Ana Garaycoa Llaguno.

== South American Wars of Independence ==
In 1815, on a business trip to Port-au-Prince (Haiti) he met the Liberator Simon Bolivar, who invited him to collaborate with the revolutionary actions against the Crown of Spain.

On February 8, 1816, he was traveling with his wife and two daughters to Callao, when off Isla Verde they spotted a corsair squadron anchored in Puná. Villamil turned to warn of the danger, being chased by a brigantine and a schooner and as he passed the Punta de Piedra fort he asked them to fire and stop them. At one in the morning of the 9th he arrived at the port and sounded the alarm. Eight hours later the fleet appeared and Villamil received the order to position himself with a company in "a pampita" in front of the shore and from there he answered the fire with serious danger to his life. The battle favored the people of Guayaquil who boarded the enemy's flagship Santísima Trinidad and took prisoner captain Guillermo Brown, sent by the Revolutionary Junta of the United Provinces of the Río de la Plata to obtain the independence of Guayaquil and not to plunder it as was believed at first. Villamil acted as translator and found out about the project.

In 1818 he lived in Lima and worked for independence. But the Viceroy José de La Serna made him reprove his libertarian intentions through the mouth of Marshal José de la Mar, inspector general of the Viceroyalty.

On October 1, 1820, he organized a dance at his house to bring together the officers of the royalist battalions stationed in Guayaquil, with the aim of initiating a conspiracy. In the following days, he visited various personalities, offering them the direction of the movement. On Saturday the 7th, the conspirators including the Peruvian lieutenant colonel Gregorio Escobedo, second in command of the garrison, decided to advance the revolution to the early hours of Monday the 9th, because the authorities were beginning to suspect that something was afoot. On October 9 Guayaquil woke up free from Spanish rule and Villamil was acclaimed in the streets for being one of the main leaders of the revolution together with the Venezuelan officers Luis Urdaneta and León de Febres Cordero. His wife made the blue and white flag that she threw from the balcony of her house to the town, in the early hours of the morning.

On the 14th he was commissioned to report to Lord Cochrane, that he was with his fleet somewhere in the Pacific. Villamil found him on the 31st anchored in the bay of Ancón and the next day he was presented to Libertador San Martín who gave him a horse and promoted him to Lieutenant Colonel, decorating him with the Order El Sol del Perú in the degree of Knight. Upon his return Villamil brought 150 carbines; and received the medal of "Los Libertadores de Guayaquil" and the title of Lieutenant Colonel in November, after the installation of the Electoral College.

Later he commanded a battalion created to contain the royalists in Babahoyo and had as chief the Peruvian colonel Toribio Luzuriaga, sent by San Martín to support the independence of Guayaquil. On the 21st he assisted in the defense of Guayaquil when the gunboats and two warships revolted, he traveled to Panama and embarked the "Córdoba" division that will fight in the Pichincha. For these trips, the State recognized a merits and a grant, which was not paid for until years later, when it was transferred to a third party who could attempt to collect, for 10% of its value.

In 1822 he was part of a group of "Colombians" led by his in-laws, the aristocratic Garaycoa family, and it was through this interaction that he became close friends with the South American Liberator Simón Bolívar, whom he continually visited to share various literary works in French. With the conclusion of the Battle of Pichincha he was promoted to Colonel.

== After independence war ==
In 1824 he asked the Cabildo for authorization to provide water to the city, but the project was a failure. In 1828, he defended Guayaquil from the Peruvian blockade and, when the plaza was handed over on deposit, he was taken prisoner along with his brothers‑in‑law, José and Francisco de Garaycoa. Between 1829 and 1830, he served as President of the Municipality of Guayaquil.

In October 1831, he sent an exploratory commission to the Galápagos archipelago to investigate the existence of orchilla—a plant used for dyeing fabrics that was exported to Mexico—and on November 14, he established the “Colonizing Society of the Galápagos Archipelago” and proclaimed Charles Island as vacant, later renamed Floreana. In December, he joined General Luis Urdaneta’s revolution and was elected Commander of Arms of Guayaquil.

In January 1832, he formed a “militia corps” to repel the attack of the Flores Battalion soldiers who had revolted. On the 20th, an expedition to the Galápagos was dispatched under the command of Colonel Ignacio Hernández. In 1833, he briefly served as Consul General of the United States in Guayaquil and traveled to the Galápagos as governor of the archipelago; there, he carried out his duties “with acumen, sagacity, and great practical spirit.”

The vessel HMS Beagle brought a British scientific expedition under the command of Captain Robert FitzRoy to the Galápagos on September 15, 1835. Together with the young naturalist Charles Darwin, they conducted a study of the geology and biology on four of the islands before continuing their expedition around the world. The ship sailed within the archipelago for five weeks, although Darwin stayed onshore for only two weeks. He examined the local animals and plants—observations that later enabled him to formulate the theory of the origin of species. Villamil resigned as governor of the Galápagos in 1837 because the number of settlers had diminished. In his place, he left General Pedro Mena, who would manage his assets. In 1841, he was called to military service and took part in the Pasto campaign with General Juan José Flores. He returned to the Galápagos and, and with the help of his daughter Ana Villamil de Alarcón, moved his cattle to avoid conflicts with the settlers of “Floreana.”

At the beginning of August 1842, while in the Galápagos, he learned of a yellow fever epidemic in Panama; thus, he set sail at full speed with the intention of communicating the news so that all ships arriving from the northern coasts—from Mexico, Central America, and Panama—could be quarantined; however, when he reached port, it was too late, as days earlier, on August 31, the English schooner “Queen Victoria,” coming from Veraguas with several ill persons, had already anchored, and shortly afterward the ship "Bruja” also arrived infected.

After the revolution of March 6, 1845, he was sent to Manabí to secure the support of Governor José María Urbina for the movement. He returned to Guayaquil with a “division of revolutionaries.” His first report on the Galápagos read as follows:

“Delicious temperature, 60 to 65°F. Abundant, good water. Fertile land, as it produces in both zones. A population of 12,000 inhabitants could be maintained. Currently there are 48 cultivated plots and 51 cabins. It is estimated that there will be a population of 400 people. There is a road 3,000 m long and 10 m wide, with plans to extend it to 400 m. There is a water spring yielding 80 gallons per hour, and the water can be conveyed through bamboo piping; but in 1833 President Flores ordered that criminals be deported to the Galápagos, and since then the colony has become a dangerous place.”

He participated in the battles at “La Elvira,” losing one of his ships in a shipwreck while transporting troops. Although he claimed compensation from the National Congress, he was only promoted to “General of the Republic” and assigned to the administration of the Customs Office of Manabí, where he also had a romantic liaison with Casimira Chávez, resulting in another daughter.

During this period, his daughters Ana Maria and Colombia Villamil married in Montecristi to the brothers Nicolás Alarcón and Colonel Pedro Alarcón. In 1849, he traveled to California, drawn by the gold rush, and was shipwrecked, saving his passengers in boats that he piloted to port. When General Flores announced his expedition to Guayaquil, he rejoined the armed forces. In 1851, he served as Minister General during Urbina’s administration; during this period, his daughter Maria Bolivia Villamil married the politician and aristocrat Francisco Pablo Icaza Paredes. As a devout Mason, he influenced his son‑in‑law to petition the National Congress for the manumission of slaves. When the matter was brought before the Chamber of Deputies, Dr. Francisco Xavier de Aguirre Abad opposed it, arguing that the rights of the owners would be harmed, and requested to draft a bill to create funds to purchase the freedom (manumission) of the slaves. This was carried out faithfully, and a tax on testaments was established, the proceeds of which were used to fund the Manumission Boards created in the Republic. Thus Villamil was the driving force behind the termination of slavery in Ecuador, and Urbina was the signatory of the actual decree.

In 1853, he served as “Encargado de Negocios” of Ecuador to the government of the United States. He returned in 1854 and visited the Galápagos with Consul Matheo P. Game in search of commercial deposits of guano; however, none were found.

On October 12, he pressed his complaint to the government and soon obtained a guano concession; however, it was revoked the following year. In 1856, he was elected deputy to the National Congress. In 1857, he became commander general of the Guayas district. In 1858, he was appointed chief of the general staff. In 1859, he participated in the defense of Guayaquil during the attack by the combined forces of García Moreno and Flores, and after the battle, he went into exile in Peru.

He returned in 1862, afflicted with bronchial asthma and heart disease. In 1866, upon learning of the Spanish navy’s aggression against Chile and Peru, he offered his services to the latter nation, but due to his poor health, he could not travel to Callao as planned. On May 11, the news of the Peruvian triumph reached Guayaquil. He was in his final moments. Moved by the enthusiasm he observed in those around him, he had every detail of the event reported; he assimilated the information, made his observations and forecasts, and the next day, at age 77, he died—not before handing over the last coin in his possession to his granddaughter, Ana Luz de Ycaza Villamil.

In 1863, he published in Lima his famous “Review of the Political and Military Events of the Province of Guayaquil from 1813 to 1824 inclusive,” which has seen several editions."Reseña de los acontecimientos políticos y militares de la Provincia de Guayaquil" (in Spanish). miniaturadeimagen|Tomb in the General Cemetery of Guayaquil “He died after fifty years of service without a pension for his old age.” His daughters claimed one‑third of Floreana Island from the government, but it was not granted. His grandchildren authorized private parties to harvest the wild cattle from the islands, descended from those brought by Villamil in 1832.

In 1850, Eugène Souville described him in “My Maritime Memories” as:

“Of medium stature, broad-shouldered, with a flushed face and thick, low eyebrows, lively eyes, an ardent, passionate, and emphatic manner of speaking. He is a man who seems made for action and adventure, and indeed, these qualities have never been lacking in him. In his early years, he had fallen in love before leaving Louisiana with a beautiful and wealthy Creole young lady. Villamil, that poor fellow without money, despite his beautiful eyes and blonde hair, was dismissed by the girl’s parents, who married her off to another suitor. His despair was great; then he expatriated himself, came to this country, and married on his own side. The beauty from Louisiana soon became a widow and, recalling her first admirer, wrote to Villamil, ‘What to do? I am married.’ Some years passed and he too became a widower. Without hesitation, Villamil flew to Louisiana… Oh, what misfortune! The beauty, to soothe her sorrow, had taken a second husband. The blow was severe; our hero was on the verge of seeking solace in another marriage. Fortunately, he did not; by a turn of fortune that crowned his perseverance, her second husband joined with the first. After four days, our enamored man of sixty years set sail for Louisiana, where the narrative would end,” and he concludes, “I have conversed with Villamil in Spanish for over an hour and have never heard this beautiful language spoken with such eloquence.”

== See also ==
- Ana Villamil Icaza
