= Saraguro people =

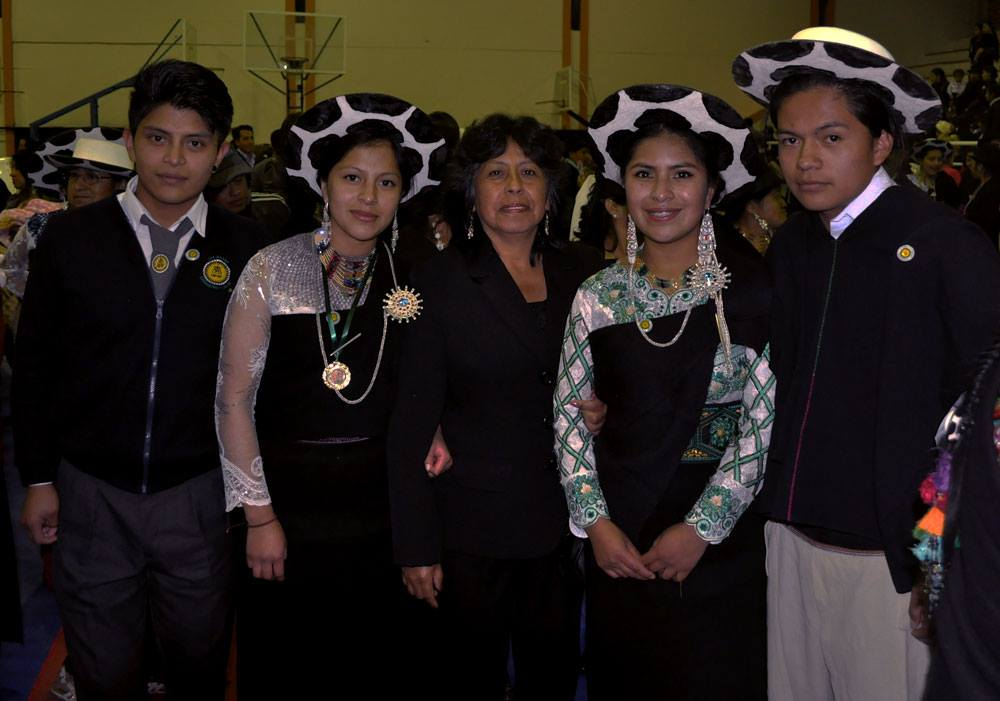

Total population
- c. 30,000

Regions with significant populations
- Ecuador 30,183 (2010)

Languages
- Kichwa, Spanish

Religion
- Andean Kichwa Cosmovision; Christianity

The Saraguro is a people of the Kichwa nation most of whom live in Saraguro Canton in the Loja Province of Ecuador. Although most now speak Spanish, Runashimi or Kichwa, a Quechua dialect, is also spoken and language revitalization efforts are being implemented. Likewise, the Saraguro have retained much of their land, customs and traditional dress. According to the INEC's 2010 population census, the total population of Saraguro canton is 30,183, but that total includes both the Indigenous and non-Indigenous people living in Saraguro.

The Saraguro may be the descendants of people re-settled from distant regions in the Inca Empire in the 15th and early 16th century.

== Origins ==
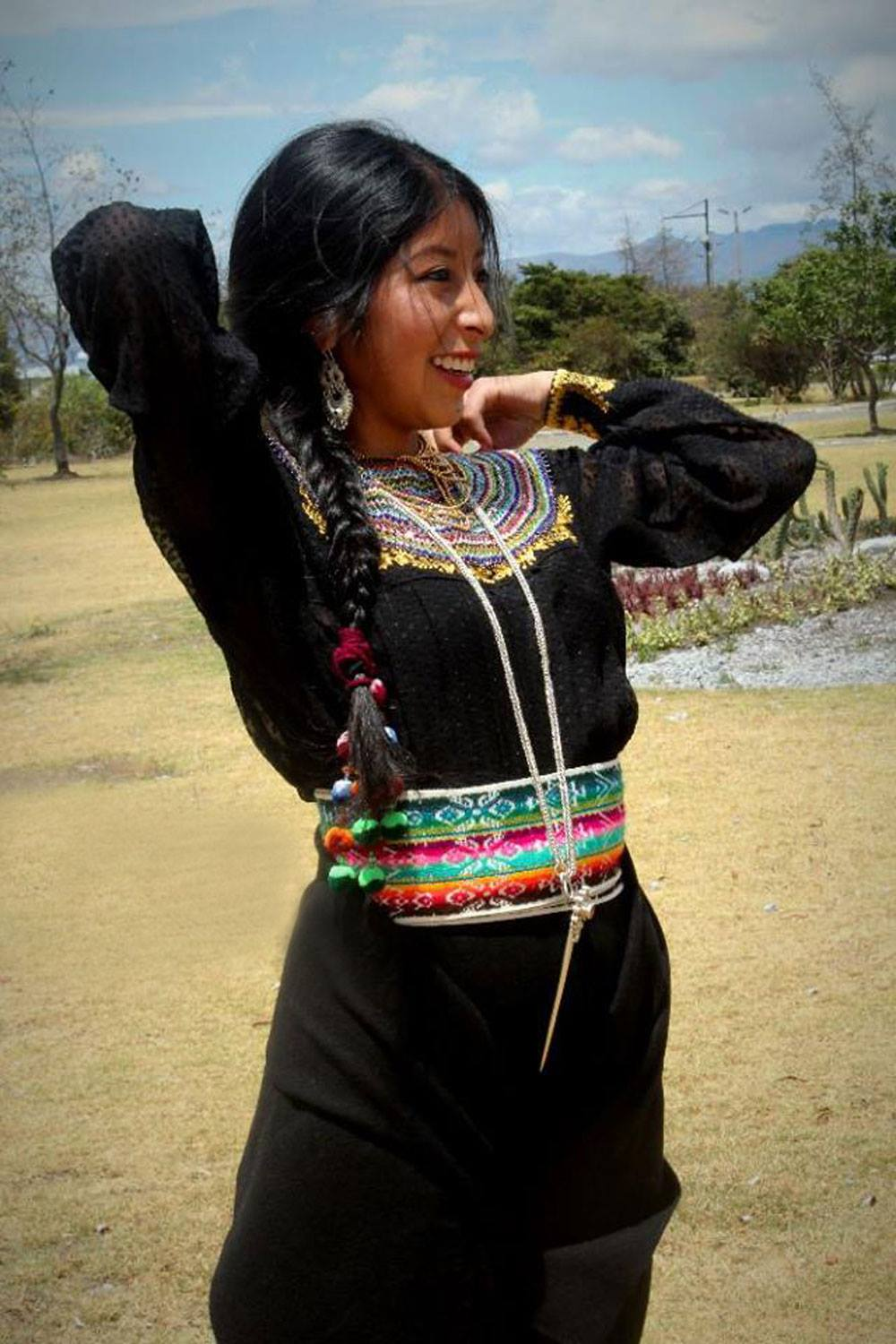
A Saraguro woman wearing a traditional dress.

In the 1460s the Inca empire conquered the Saraguro area. The pre-Inca people may have been the barely-known Palta or the Cañari. The ancestors of the modern-day Saraguro people, according to oral traditions, were moved to Saraguro by the Incas from other areas, possibly the Colla or other people from the Lake Titicaca and Cuzco regions. The Incas had a policy of forcibly moving people from one region of the empire to another, thereby diversifying the population and dispersing possible opposition to their rule. The resettlement policy was called mitma. The numbers resettled were large, estimated to be up to 80 percent of the population of some provinces. One Spanish document says that the ancestors of present-day Saraguros were elite soldiers in the Inca army. This statement is bolstered by the fact that the Saraguros live along the Inca road or Kapak Ñan that stretched from Cuzco to Tumebamba (the northern capital of the Incas), and onward to Quito and thus occupied an important link for Inca communications and control of the empire. The town of Saraguro, however, seems to have been founded by the Spanish rather than the Incas although a number of Inca ruins are in the nearby area.

Whatever the facts about their origins. Saraguro in the 20th century celebrate their Inca heritage. In a debunked theory, some authors ascribe the black clothing typical of the Saraguro as a sign of mourning for the death of the Inca Emperor Atahualpa. Schools have been named after Inca emperors, Inca customs recreated, Inca architecture copied, and efforts made to preserve the Kichwa language. Historical records and oral traditions also attribute the traditional black and white colors of their clothing to ceremony and nobility, which were the meanings given by the Incas according to chronicler Cieza de León and recounted by the Saraguro. Being descendants of the elite soldiers of the Inca army, they retained that symbolism as well as the male population retained their long-braided hair, which was another marker of nobility among the Incas. Black as a sign of mourning is not part of the Inca symbolism nor among the Saraguros but has been adopted, especially by the young generations. Likewise, they attribute the symbolic concepts of their clothing to a representation of the Curiquingue (carunculated caracara), which has black and white feathers and was a symbolic bird of the Inca royalty. The Curiquingue inhabits the Saraguro parish and páramos and its symbols represented in costumes continue to be present in the Kapak Raymi (the Great Celebration) celebrations in Saraguro.

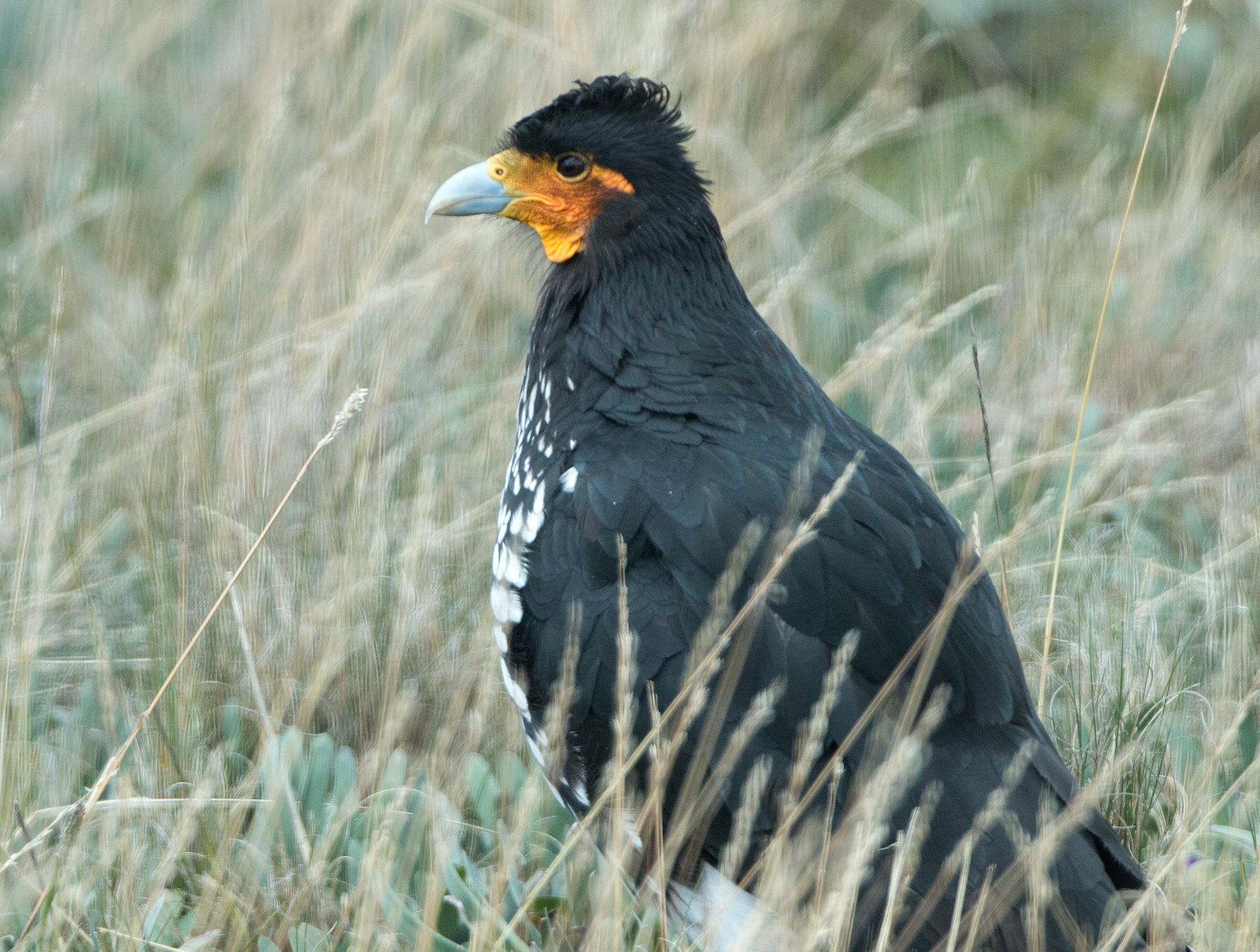
Carunculated Caracara

The Saraguros have retained control over their lands more successfully than many of the Andean subjects of Spanish colonization and contemporary colonialism of the independent country of Ecuador. Part of this may be due to their initial hostility to the Spanish and the Indigenous people who collaborated with them. More importantly, however, the Saraguros were required by the Spanish to maintain an important tambo (inn or way-station) along a major communication route. They successfully argued that the operation and maintenance of the tambo required that they retain their land and its resources. They continued to manage the tambo until the 1940s when a motor road reached the area.

== Clothing of the saraguros ==
For women:

- Anaco: made out of wool most of the time
- Skirt: This goes under the anaco, it has embroidery on the edge that usually combines with the sash and the shirt or blouse
- Hat: Woolen and white with black designs, it can weigh up to a pound and a half.
- Cloth or rebozo: It is a garment made with sheep's wool and dyed black, although currently it can also be found in blue and is used to cover oneself from the cold.
- Earrings and tendrils have crescent shapes.
- Wallka is a multi-colored fabric made with beads.
- Tupu: It is a jewel that is used to hold the cloth with a chain that hangs around the neck to hold the tupu, it is silver with a colored pearl in the center. In families, the tupo or mole is given from the mother to her daughter and so on for their generations in the form of an inheritance.
- Shirt or blouse: This garment stands out for the embroideries that can currently be found in various designs
- Girdle: It is a garment that holds the anaco and the skirt, it also represents the fertility of women and the protection of the womb. The designs must match the shirt.

For men

- Poncho: Black wool that is used mostly in gala events.
- Belt: It is made of leather, with gold knobs and other decorations that represent the wealth of the man.
- Pants: Black that goes to the knee.
- Zamarro: Made of white wool that covers only the front part, from the ankles to the waist.
- Shoes: They didn't wear shoes until the 1950s, but now their shoes are black.

== Contemporary Saraguros ==
Most of the Saraguros live at intermediate elevations in the Andes between 1,800 metres (5,900 ft) and 2,800 metres (9,200 ft). Traditionally they are farmers and livestock herders. A shortage of land in their homeland has led many to migrate eastward into the Zamora-Chinchipe Province of Ecuador. Others have migrated to Europe and the United States. Many contemporary Saraguros are doctors, architects, engineers, musicians, photographers, construction workers, artisans, farmers, entrepreneurs, politicians, teachers, lawyers, cooks, activists. And others continue to do agro-pastoralist activities while holding professional careers or combine more than one occupation. While having a distinctive identity, they are engaged in the consumer society and technology as much as most of the Ecuadorian society is. Issues such as teenage pregnancy, environmental degradation, deforestation, discrimination, racism, discontinuation of traditions are also present across the Saraguro territory.

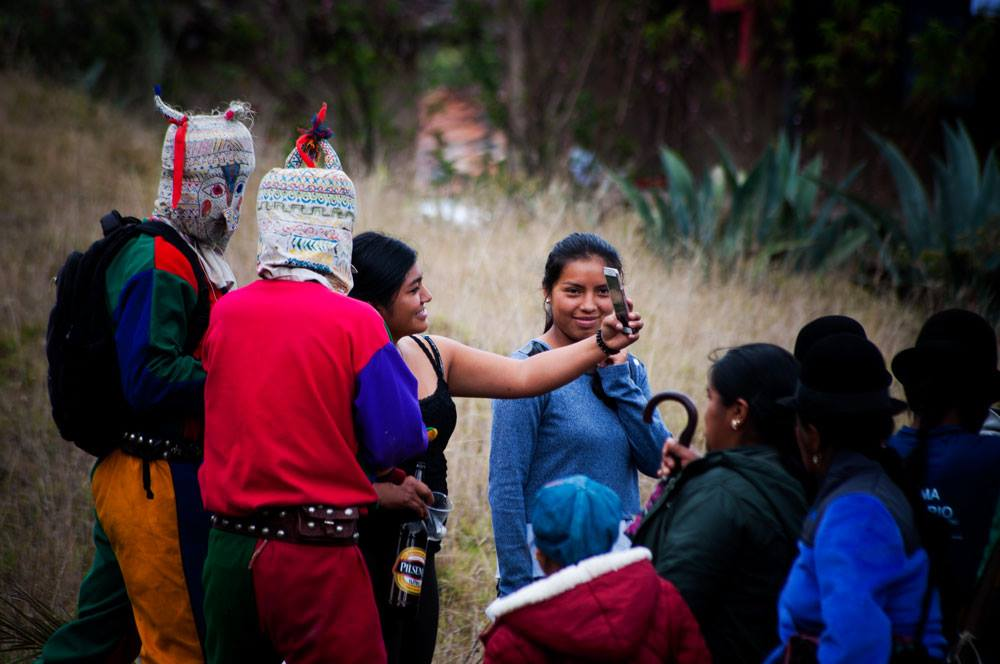
Saraguro girl taking a selfie with the Wikis during a Kapak Raymi celebration in December 2017

== Contemporary Activism ==
Saraguro activists and intellectuals are fighting for food sovereignty, decolonization, water protection, against polluting mining, Indigenous resurgence, legal pluralism, Indigenous Justice and autonomy from the Ecuadorian State.

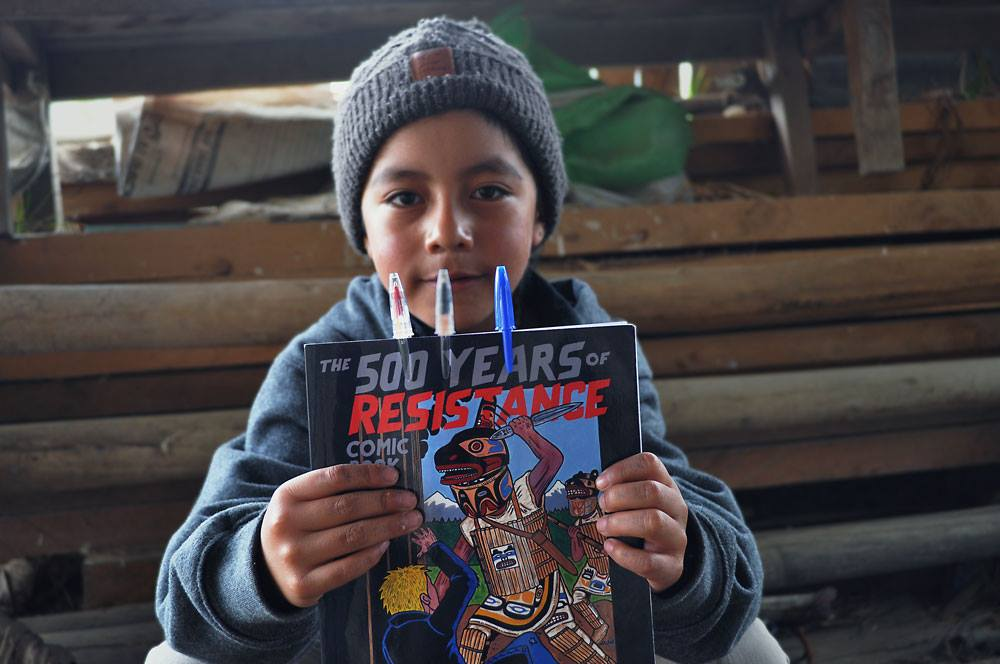
500 Years of Resistance

== Saraguro Political Leaders and Intellectuals ==
=== Luis Macas ===
Macas has honorary university degrees in anthropology, linguistics and jurisprudence. He was one of the founders of the CONAIE and of the Pachakutik Movement, and was member of the National Congress of Ecuador.

=== Sisa Pacari Bacacela Gualan ===
She has served as Secretary for Bilingual Education in the Unión Nacional Educadores del Ecuador. She has authored several books, among them:

Ecuador Chinchasuyupi Quichuacunapac Ñaupa Rimai = Literatura Indígena En Los Andes Del Sur Del Ecuador (Indigenous Literature in the Southern Andes of Ecuador)

Cultura espiritual:Una resistencia de los Saraguros en la actualidad: Las Ofrendas Florales (Spiritual Culture: A Contemporary Saraguro Resistance: The Flowers Offering)

El Quinto Gobernador de los Saraguros: Historia Social y Organizativa (The Fifth Governor of the Saraguros: Social and Organizational History)

Article in English:

Bilingual and Intercultural Education, Perspectives and Current Reality

=== Inti Cartuche Vacacela ===
He is a sociologist and has written several academic articles on interculturality and plurinationality.

=== Luis Fernando Sarango Macas ===
Lawyer at Republic of Ecuador's Courts and Tribunals, Universidad Nacional de Loja. Diploma in Intercultural Research, Universidad Central del Ecuador. Master in University Teaching, Universidad de las Regiones Autónomas de la Costa Caribe Nicaraguense URACCAN, Nicaragua. PhD in Jurisprudence, Universidad Nacional de Loja. He belongs to the Kichwa Saraguro Indigenous People, Province of Loja - Ecuador. Leader of Education at the Coordination of Organizations of the Kichwa Saraguro People CORPUKIS - ECUARUNARI - CONAIE. Pushak / Rector of the Pluriversity "Amawtay Wasi", academic space of education of the Peoples and Nationalities of Ecuador. Rector of Universidad Comunitaria Intercultural de las Nacionalidades y Pueblos Indigenas "Amawtay Wasi", 2013 - 2015. First Coordinator of the Network of Indigenous, Intercultural and Community Universities of Abya Yala RUIICAY, 2008–2010. President of the Academic Council of the Universidad Indigena Intercultural UII-FILAC in La Paz, Bolivia. Author of the book: "The Education Paradigm of Abya Yala."

=== Carmen Lozano ===
Carmen is a member of the Saraguro People. She has been a leader of his people and also of important Indigenous, national and international organizations. She has organized peaceful marches for the defense of water and territories threatened by resources exploitation in southern Ecuador. She has promoted the exercise of Indigenous justice to harmonize the balance of life within the community.

“As ancestral peoples with their own autonomy, we do not accept anyone, that no government or company takes away our right to life”

=== Salvador Quishpe ===
Salvador Quishpe Lozano (Zamora, March 15, 1971), is an Ecuadorian politician, a Pachakutik militant and current prefect of Zamora Chinchipe; during his tenure he has become a figure of the Indigenous movement for his strong opposition to the policies of the presidency of Rafael Correa, becoming a pre-candidate of his party for the presidential election in 2017.

=== Abel Sarango ===
He is the current mayor of Saraguro canton and is the first Indigenous person occupying that position despite Saraguro being a district with the highest Indigenous population in the Southern region of Ecuador.

== Music ==
Young Saraguro musicians break from tradition not only to index their aspirations to do something with their lives other than what tradition and stereotypes dictate for them, but also to index their real opportunities to do so as Saraguros. With greater participation in formal education and increased occupational diversity and mobility, young, cosmopolitan Saraguro musicians in the southern highlands of Ecuador are working to reconstitute their Saraguro Kichwa identity in a creative and selective process by which they discard, amplify, and reinvent the aspects of what they perceive to be authentic Saraguro musical culture. They also have found other ways of expressing themselves that are compatible with their self-identification as Indigenous and do not strictly rely on ties to an Inkaic past, or even to a particular expression of Indigeneity. Rather, the tastes and ambitions of many Saraguro youth point to an alternative conceptualization of Saraguro identity that is both firmly rooted in the "modern" and respectful of a long tradition of Indigeneity. A large number of (primarily male) Saraguro youth affiliate themselves with a subculture of heavy metal music. They listen to nation and international metal bands. Some of them play in local bands and organize local concerts.

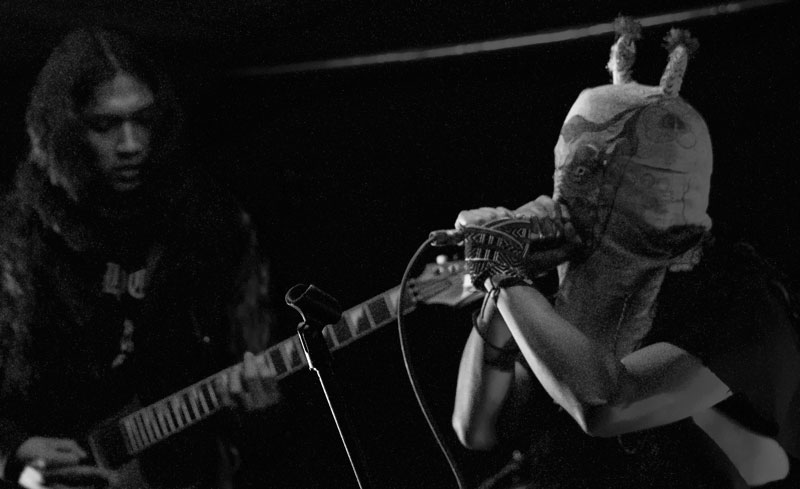
Saraguro metal band

== Film ==
The film Saraguro: Historia Escrita con Sangre Inka (2010) (Saraguro: A History Written with Inka Blood) traces the roots of the origins of the Saraguro people by combining anthropological data with Inkan cosmovision in consultation with the Saraguro people.

== External Sources ==
These are external sources about the Saraguro people and geography as well as institutions where Saraguro intellectuals are or have contributed with their knowledge:

- Amawtay Wasi Pluriversity (Pluriversidad Amawtay Wasi)
- I.C.C.I (Instituto Científico de Culturas Indígenas--Scientific Institute of Indigenous Cultures)
- Saraguro.org
- Behind scenes--Saraguro: Historia Escrita con Sangre Inka
