= Battle of Camino Real =

Part of the Ecuadorian War of Independence

- Part of the Ecuadorian War of Independence
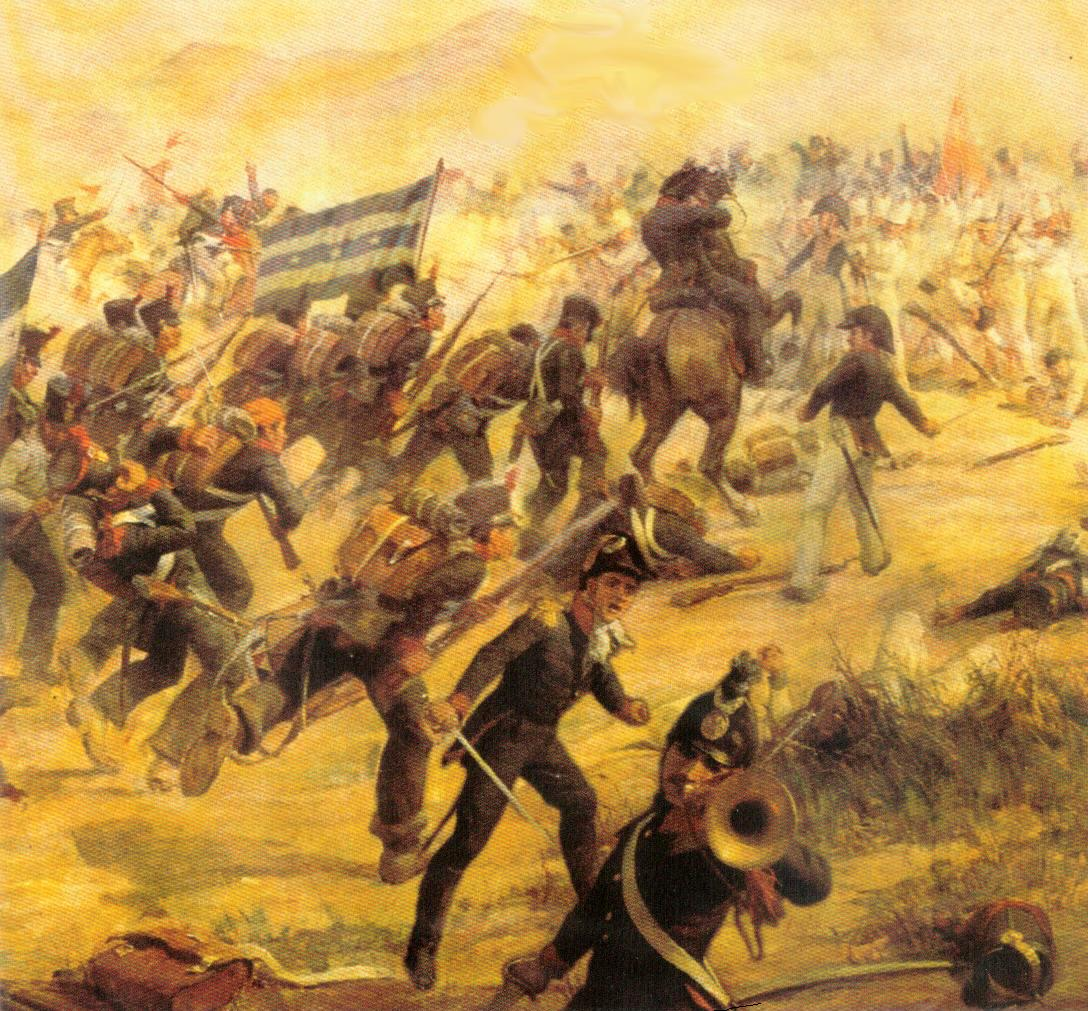
- Charge of the "División Protectora de Quito"
Date	9 November 1820
Location	near Bilován, Ecuador 1°48′30″S 79°07′10″W
Result	Patriot victory

Belligerents
Free Province of Guayaquil	Kingdom of Spain

Commanders and leaders
León de Febres-Cordero; Luis Urdaneta	Antonio Fominaya; Damián Alba

Strength
1 cavalry battalion 6 infantry battalions	300 men

Casualties and losses
Unknown	Unknown

The Battle of Camino Real, was the first battle in the Ecuadorian War of Independence, that took place on 9 November 1820. The battle was fought between Royalist soldiers in support of the Spanish Empire, and the Patriot forces of the Free Province of Guayaquil, who won the battle.

== Background ==
The Royal Audiencia of Quito had been a Royalist stronghold after the brutal suppression of the Quito Revolution (1809–1812).
But after Bolívar's campaign which liberated Colombia in 1819, the Patriots in Guayaquil regained courage and organized in 1820 the successful October 9 Revolution, which led to the establishment of the Free Province of Guayaquil. The Guayaquil revolutionaries decided that their first objective should be the liberation of the capital Quito, and raised an army to this end.

== The battle ==
The combat took place in the Camino Real sector, near the small town of Bilován, south of the city of Guaranda. The Guayaquil troops advanced towards the northwest, in an attempt to reach Quito. However, the Royalists had fortified themselves in Camino Real with the aim of stopping the Patriots and after this, organize an attack on the city of Guayaquil itself, and thus end the rebellion within the Royal Audiencia of Quito.

The Guayaquil forces, or the so-called División Protectora de Quito, were commanded by Colonels Luis Urdaneta and León de Febres-Cordero, while the Royalists was led by Colonel Antonio Fominaya. The Royalists had prepared several ambushes, however, the pro-independence troops were alerted to Fominaya's movements, after which they conceived and developed a strategy that allowed them to win the battle and, subsequently, make the Royalists retreat towards the north.

== Consequences ==
The victory at Camino Real raised the hope of the Guayaquil troops in their desire to advance to the capital and thereby consolidate the independence of Guayaquil. However, in the following weeks, the Patriot troops suffered serious defeats that would jeopardize their independence.
But in 1821, they obtained help from Gran Colombia and with this they were able to achieve the final objective after a campaign that would last for 2 years.

== Sources ==
- Casa de la Cultura Ecuatoriana
- Enciclopedia del Ecuador
- Avilés Pino, Efrén; Hoyos Galarza, Melvin (2009). Historia de Guayaquil (Primera edición). Guayaquil: M.I. Municipalidad de Guayaquil.
- Salvador Lara, Jorge. Del Alzamiento de Guayaquil a la Batalla del Pichincha; Historia del Ecuador (Primera edición). Quito: Salvat.
