= Saraguro =

Capital of Saraguro Canton in Loja Province, Ecuador

- Parish and town
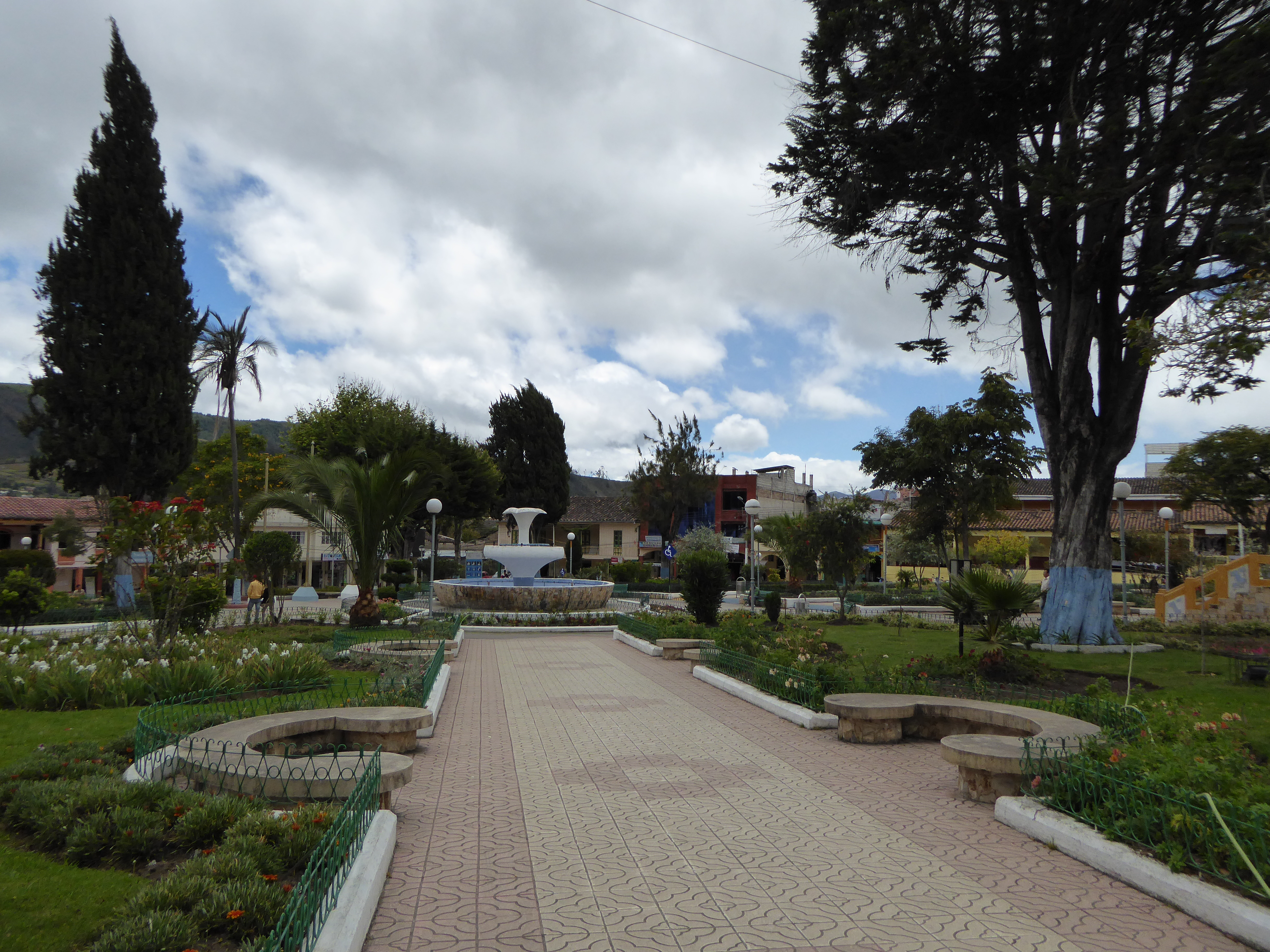
- The main plaza in Saraguro

- Location within Ecuador
- Coordinates: 3.62343°S 79.23853°W
- Country: Ecuador
- Province: Loja Province
- Canton: Saraguro Canton

Area
  - Parish and town: 75.85 km^{2} (29.29 sq mi)
  - Town: 1.91 km^{2} (0.74 sq mi)

Population (2022 census)
  - Parish and town: 9,679
  - Density: 127.6/km^{2} (330.5/sq mi)
  - Town: 4,656
  - Town density: 2,440/km^{2} (6,310/sq mi)

Saraguro (also Sarakuru) is a parish and the capital of Saraguro Canton in Loja Province, Ecuador. Saraguro parish has an area of 75.85 square kilometres (29.29 sq mi). The population of the parish increased from 7,346 in 2001 to 9,045 in 2010. Saraguro town had a population of 3,124 in 2001 and 4,031 in 2010 and is situated at an elevation of 2,719 metres (8,921 ft).

The Saraguro is an Indigenous people part of the Kichwa nation who inhabit the Southern Highlands in Ecuador. They are a major component of the population and culture of the town and canton of Saraguro, which other major group of inhabitants are mestizos. Their clothing is characterized in the men by the ponchos and white hats with black spots (at the moment, they used the hats with wide wing made of wool of sheep) and espadrilles; and in women by the anacos and shawls of the same color.

== Climate ==
Climate data for Saraguro, elevation 2,520 m (8,270 ft), (1961–1990)
Month	Jan	Feb	Mar	Apr	May	Jun	Jul	Aug	Sep	Oct	Nov	Dec	Year
Mean daily maximum °C (°F)	18.2 (64.8)	18.2 (64.8)	18.1 (64.6)	18.2 (64.8)	17.7 (63.9)	17.3 (63.1)	17.3 (63.1)	17.6 (63.7)	17.7 (63.9)	18.2 (64.8)	18.3 (64.9)	18.6 (65.5)	18.0 (64.3)
Mean daily minimum °C (°F)	9.3 (48.7)	9.3 (48.7)	9.3 (48.7)	9.1 (48.4)	9.1 (48.4)	8.8 (47.8)	8.8 (47.8)	8.6 (47.5)	8.8 (47.8)	9.1 (48.4)	9.0 (48.2)	9.0 (48.2)	9.0 (48.2)
Average precipitation mm (inches)	68.0 (2.68)	107.0 (4.21)	114.0 (4.49)	90.0 (3.54)	48.0 (1.89)	52.0 (2.05)	43.0 (1.69)	35.0 (1.38)	40.0 (1.57)	59.0 (2.32)	56.0 (2.20)	68.0 (2.68)	780 (30.7)
Source: FAO
