= Mariana Carcelén =

Ecuadorian aristocrat (1805–1861)

The Marquise of Villarocha
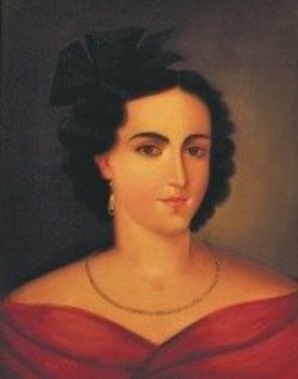

First Lady of Bolivia
- In role 20 April 1828 – 28 April 1828
- President: Antonio José de Sucre
- Preceded by: Manuela Sáenz
- Succeeded by: María Cernadas de la Cámara

Personal details
- Born: María Ana Carcelén de Guevara y Larrea-Zurbano; 27 July 1805 Real Audiencia of Quito, Spanish Empire
- Died: 15 December 1861 (aged 56) Cotocollao, Quito, Pichincha, Ecuador
- Spouses: Antonio José de Sucre (m. 1828; died 1830); Isidoro Barriga y López de Castro (m. 1831; died 1850); José Baltazar Carrión Torres (m. 1851)

María Ana Carcelén de Guevara y Larrea-Zurbano, 5th Marquise of Villarocha and 7th Marquise of Solanda (27 July 1805 – 15 December 1861) was an Ecuadorian aristocrat and the wife of the Venezuelan independence leader Antonio José de Sucre. She is considered the First Lady of Bolivia.

== Biography ==
Carcelén was born outside of Quito, in the Real Audiencia of Quito of the Spanish Empire. She was the daughter of Felipe Carcelén y Sánchez de Orellana, 6th Marquess of Villarocha, Captain general of Borja, and his wife, Teresa de Larrea y Jijón. Her father was a vocal participant in the First government Junta of Quito in 1809.

=== Marriage to Antonio José de Sucre ===
Carcelén first encountered Sucre in the city of Quito on 24 May 1822, after the Battle of Pichincha. During the battle, she and her family took refuge in the convent of the Church of Santo Domingo. Upon hearing the celebration of the troops, the family exited the front of the church to watch the procession. When he saw Carcelén, Sucre dismounted his horse, introduced himself to her family, and reassured them that it was safe to return to their home. When they met, Carcelén was 17 and Sucre was 27.

Before his death in 1823, the Marquess went to visit Sucre in Quito to offer Carcelén, his heiress, in marriage. Although Sucre accepted the courtship, he continued to dedicate himself to the war against Spain, and he and Carcelén exchanged letters for several years. The pair married on 20 April 1828, however because Sucre was the President of Bolivia, General Vicente Aguirre was present during the ceremony as Sucre's representative. Aguirre also visited the Carcelén Mansion, where Sucre and Carcelén would live, and informed Sucre of its condition, as well as oversaw its redecoration.

After the marriage, Carcelén became the 1st First Lady of Bolivia, a position she would hold for 8 days until Sucre resigned on 28 April 1828.

Sucre returned to Quito on 30 September 1828, and the pair moved into the Carcelén Mansion. Ten months later the Marquise gave birth to their first daughter, María Teresa de Sucre y Carcelén de Guevara.

==== Assassination of Sucre ====
In 1829 Sucre received the order to return to Bogotá to preside over the Congress of Gran Colombia in an attempt to avoid its dissolution. He was assassinated in the Berruecos mountains on 4 June 1830. Carcelén learned of his death 2 weeks later and penned a letter to General José María Obando, accusing him of having plotted her husband's murder.

=== Second marriage ===
On 16 July 1831, Carcelén married a second time to the Colombian general Isidoro Barriga y López de Castro, who had fought alongside Sucre during a campaign in Peru. This was a controversial decision; the custom at the time was for a widow to wait 5 years before remarrying out of respect for the deceased husband.

On 16 November 1831, several months after the marriage, Barriga was playing with Teresa, the daughter of Sucre and Carcelén, in his arms, when she fell to the patio, hitting her head and dying instantly. Although there was some speculation that her death was intentional, most historians believe it was a tragic accident, citing Barriga's reputation as a kind and generous man, rather than bloodthirsty. Yet other historians believe that Teresa did not die in an accident at all, and instead succumbed to a stomach virus, a common cause of death in children her age during that time.

In 1832, Carcelén gave birth to Manuel Felipe Barriga y Carcelén de Guevara, her only child from the marriage. Barriga died 29 May 1850.

=== Third marriage ===
One year after the death of Barriga, Carcelén married a third time to José Baltazar Carrión Torres, a lawyer native to Loja. They had one child, Mercedes Soledad Carrión y Carcelén de Guevara, who did not make it to adulthood, likely due to problems related to the advanced age of her mother.

=== Final years and death ===
Felipe, Carcelén's only surviving child, married Josefina Flores Jijón, daughter of General Juan José Flores. Carcelén believed that General Flores had played a part in the murder of her first husband, and her relationship with her son suffered as a result of his marriage. Carcelén died on 15 December 1861 at the age of 56, and was buried in Quito. She was mourned throughout the city, where she was well-known for her charity towards the poor.
