= Museum House of Sucre =

Museum in Quito, Ecuador

Coordinates: 0°13′18″S 78°30′47″W

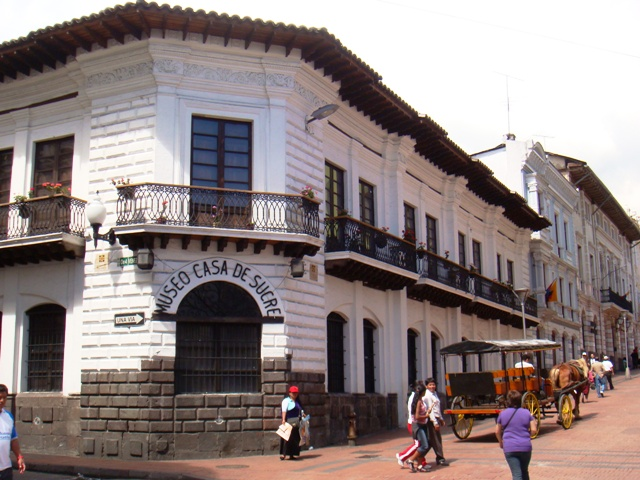
Sucre House

Sucre House (Spanish: Museo Casa de Sucre) is a museum in the historic center of Quito, Ecuador. It was established in 1977 by the Ministry of Defence. It is dedicated to the memory of its most famous occupants: the Venezuelan independence hero, Marshal Antonio José de Sucre, and his wife, Mariana Carcelén.

The museum contains the personal belongings of the couple, including the original furniture that was occupied in the different rooms of the mansion, everyday items, and even maps and documents from the time of independence. The ground floor contains many of the weapons and military equipment owned by Sucre, while the second floor contains furniture and rooms as they would have appeared in his time.
