= Second Battle of Huachi =

Part of the Ecuadorian War of Independence

- Part of the Ecuadorian War of Independence
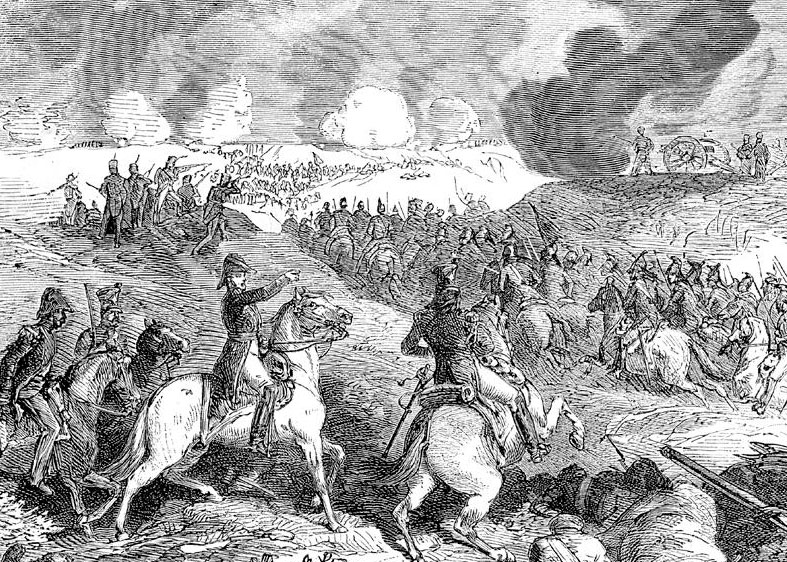
- Battle of Huachi 1821
Date	12 September 1821
Location	Huachi Grande near Ambato, Ecuador 1°17′45″S 78°38′50″W
Result	Royalist victory

Belligerents
Gran Colombia; Free Province of Guayaquil	Kingdom of Spain

Commanders and leaders
Antonio José de Sucre; José Mires	Melchor Aymerich

Strength
900 infantry 100 cavalry	1,200 infantry 500 cavalry

Casualties and losses
300 killed or wounded 500 prisoners 100 escaped	250 killed or wounded

The Second Battle of Huachi was a confrontation that occurred on 12 September 1821 between pro-independence troops led by General Antonio José de Sucre and Royalist troops led by General Melchor Aymerich, president of the Real Audiencia of Quito. Sucre, after having won the Battle of Yaguachi on 19 August, advanced towards Quito. The Spanish, who followed closely, positioned themselves to do battle in a field called Huachi, where they had already defeated Guayaquil forces a year before.

== Development of the battle ==
After a brief contact between both forces, the Spanish pretended to flee. General José Mires allowed the Albion and Guayaquil battalions to pursue the Royalists, but they were attacked by the Royalist cavalry and the infantry who turned around and encircled the Patriot battalions. With the Patriot army in disarray and Sucre wounded, the few surviving Patriots retreated to Guayaquil, leaving many men and supplies on the battlefield.

== Consequences ==
The Royalists managed to keep Quito under Spanish rule. Generals Mires and Sergeant Major Antonio Martínez de Pallares were captured. Sucre, who was wounded and dismounted, was on the verge of being taken prisoner in the rout, but was just in time saved by his aide-de-camp, the Chilean officer Manuel Jordán Valdivieso, who pulled him on the back of his horse and crossed the enemy lines.

Quito would only be conquered by Sucre after the Battle of Pichincha in May 1822.
