= Arturo Michelena =

Venezuelan painter

- Francisco Arturo Michelena Castillo
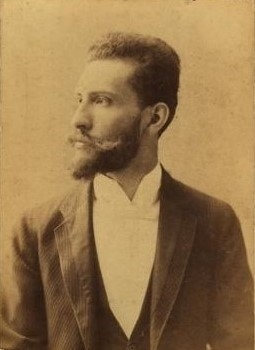
- Born: Francisco Arturo Michelena Castillo; June 16, 1863; Valencia, Venezuela
- Died: July 29, 1898 (aged 35); Caracas, Venezuela
- Education: Académie Julian, Paris
- Known for: Historical painting, genre scenes, portraiture
- Notable work: The Sick Child (1887), Charlotte Corday on the way to the scaffold (1889), Vuelvan Caras (c. 1890)
- Style: Academic art, historical realism
- Movement: 19th-century Venezuelan art
- Spouse: Lastenia Tello Mendoza
- Parents: Juan Antonio Michelena (father); Socorro Castillo (mother)
- Awards: Silver Medal, Great Exhibition of the Centennial of the Birth of Simón Bolívar (1883), Gold Medal, Salon de Paris (second class) (1887), Gold Medal, Exposition Universelle (1889)

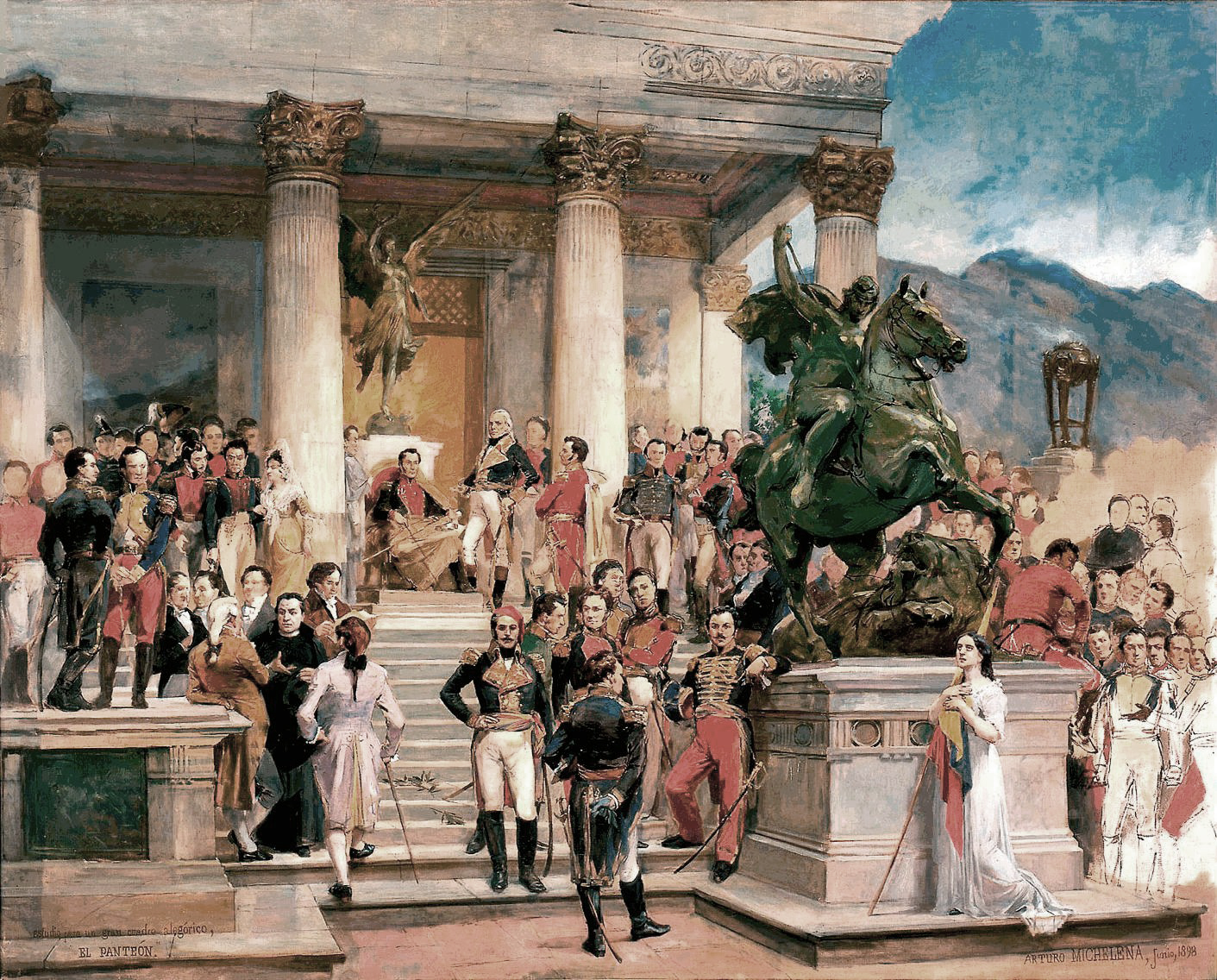
El Panteon de los Heroes, 1898

Francisco Arturo Michelena Castillo (Spanish pronunciation: [aɾˈtuɾo mitʃeˈlena]; 16 June 1863 – 29 July 1898) was a Venezuelan painter known for his historical and genre scenes and portraits.

== Biography ==
His father, Juan Antonio Michelena (1832-1918) was also a painter. His mother, Socorro Castillo (1839-1909), was the daughter of the muralist, Pedro Castillo.

He began to paint at a very early age, with lessons from his father. In 1874, aged only eleven, he drew the illustrations for the American edition of Costumbres Venezolanas (Venezuelan Customs) by the journalist Francisco de Sales Pérez (1836-1926), who became his sponsor and introduced him to the circle of influential people associated with the statesman, Antonio Guzmán Blanco, in hopes of getting him a scholarship. Later, he received lessons from a French emigrant painter named Constanza de Sauvage, who had been a student of Eugène Devéria.

From 1879 to 1882, he and his father operated a private painting academy in Valencia; fulfilling orders for portraits, wall paintings and copies of the Old Masters. In 1883, this exposure enabled him to enter two paintings in the "Great Exhibition of the Centennial of the Birth of El Libertador" (Simón Bolívar), where he was awarded a silver medal.

Two years later, he was awarded a government grant to study in Europe. He travelled to Paris, in the company of Martín Tovar y Tovar, where he enrolled at the Académie Julian and took lessons from Jean-Paul Laurens. Encouraged by Laurens, he entered the Salon of 1887 with a painting called "The Sick Child", which was awarded a gold medal in the second class; the highest honor awarded to a foreigner up to that time. Years later, the painting was acquired by the Astor family and taken to New York. He received another gold medal at the Exposition Universelle (1889) for his depiction of Charlotte Corday headed to the gallows.

That same year, he suddenly returned to Venezuela and, shortly after, married Lastenia Tello Mendoza, a well known art collector. After that, he and his bride returned to Paris. In 1890, he was hired to provide illustrations for Hernani by Victor Hugo. He also received a commission from the Venezuelan government, to create a work that would be presented to the city of New York, in thanks for the hospitality shown to General José Antonio Páez, during his exile there. He produced "Vuelvan Caras" (About Face), depicting the General at the Battle of Las Queseras del Medio.

He contracted tuberculosis in 1892 and, on the advice of his doctors, returned once again to Venezuela. There, he painted fashion portraits and was named the official painter to President Joaquín Crespo; receiving a major commission to paint decorations at the Palacio de Miraflores, the official residence.

He died of his tuberculosis in 1898, aged only thirty-five, leaving numerous works unfinished.

== Gallery ==
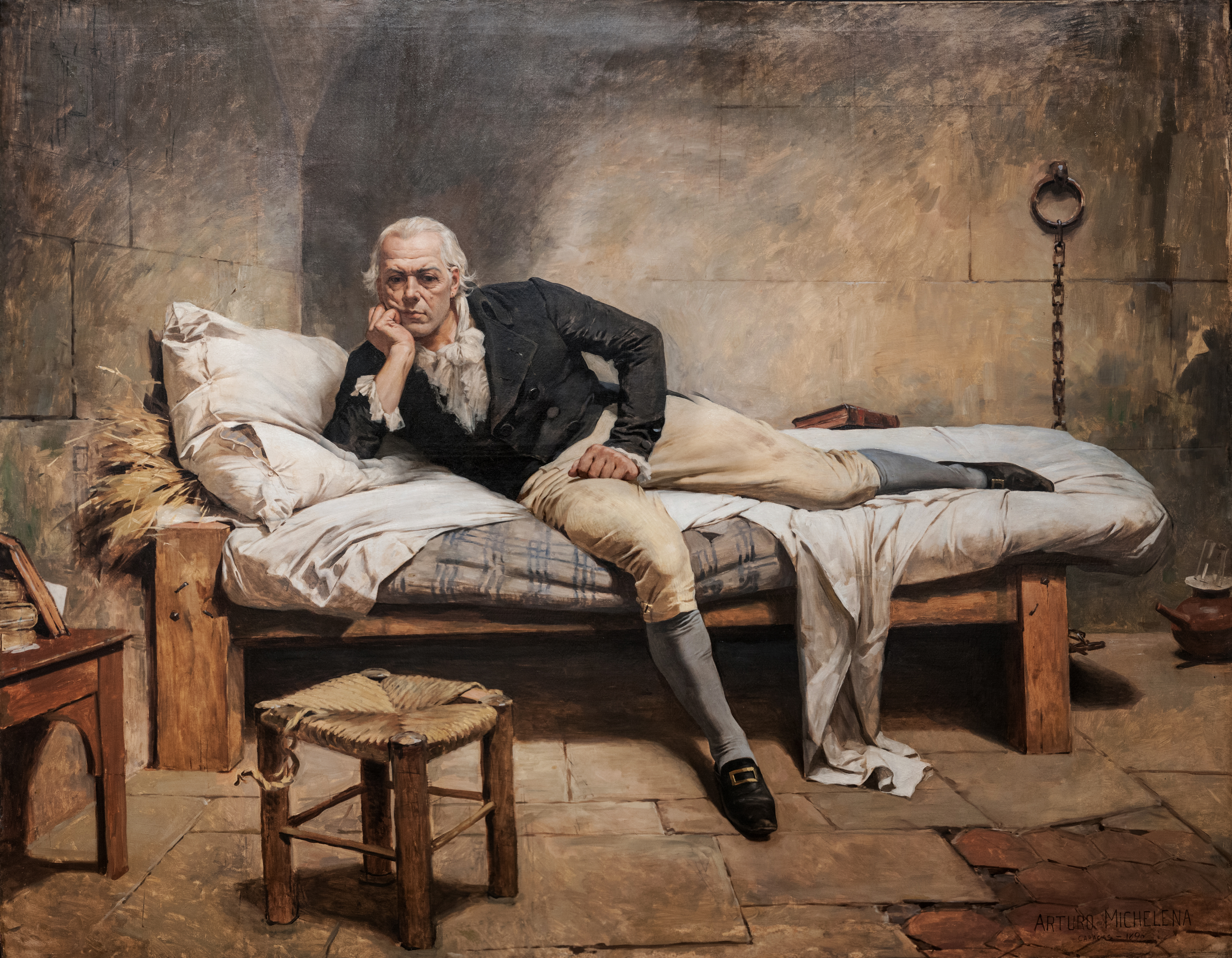
Miranda in La Carraca, 1896

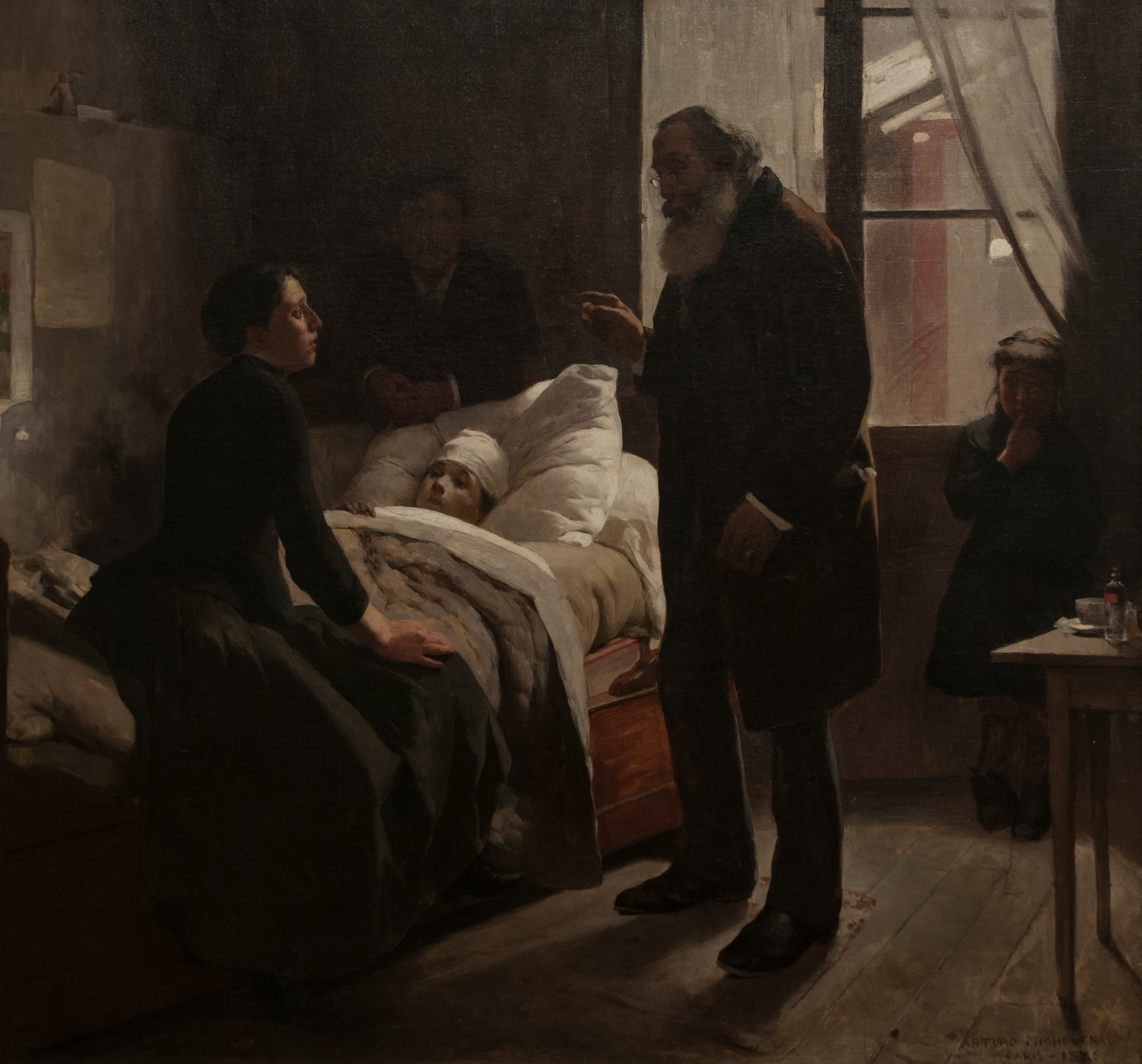
The Sick Child, 1886

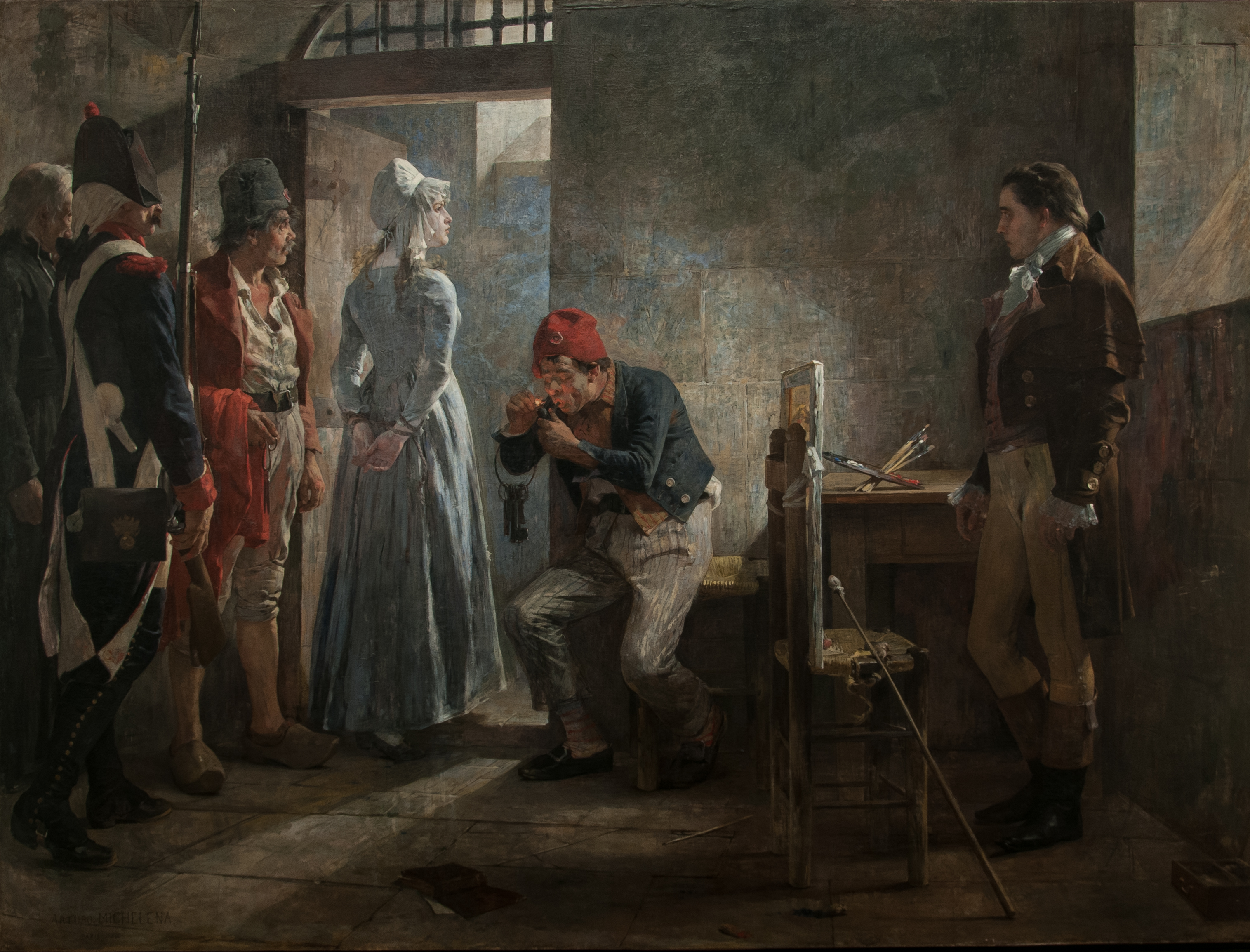
Charlotte Corday, 1889

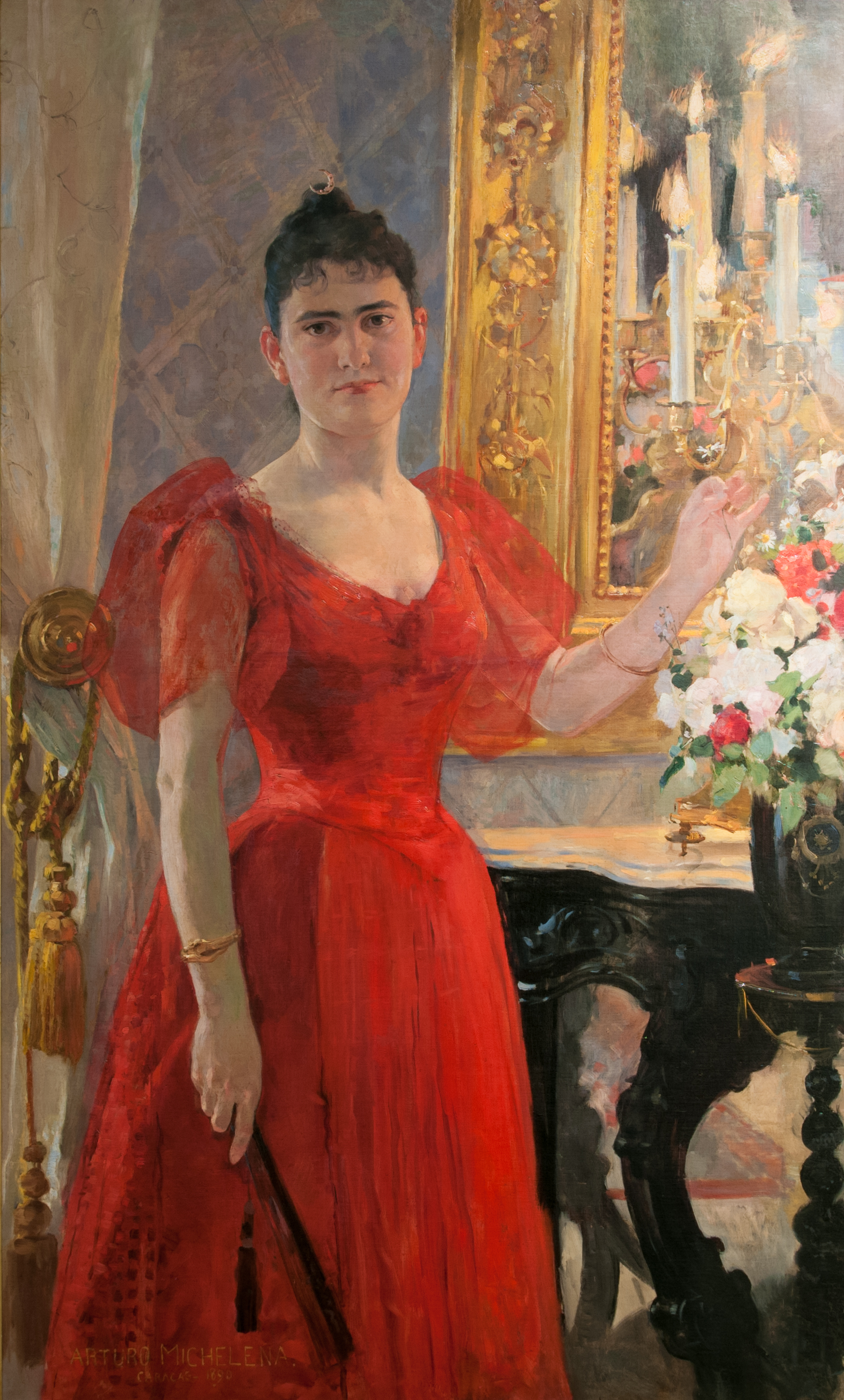
Portrait of his wife, Lastenia, 1890

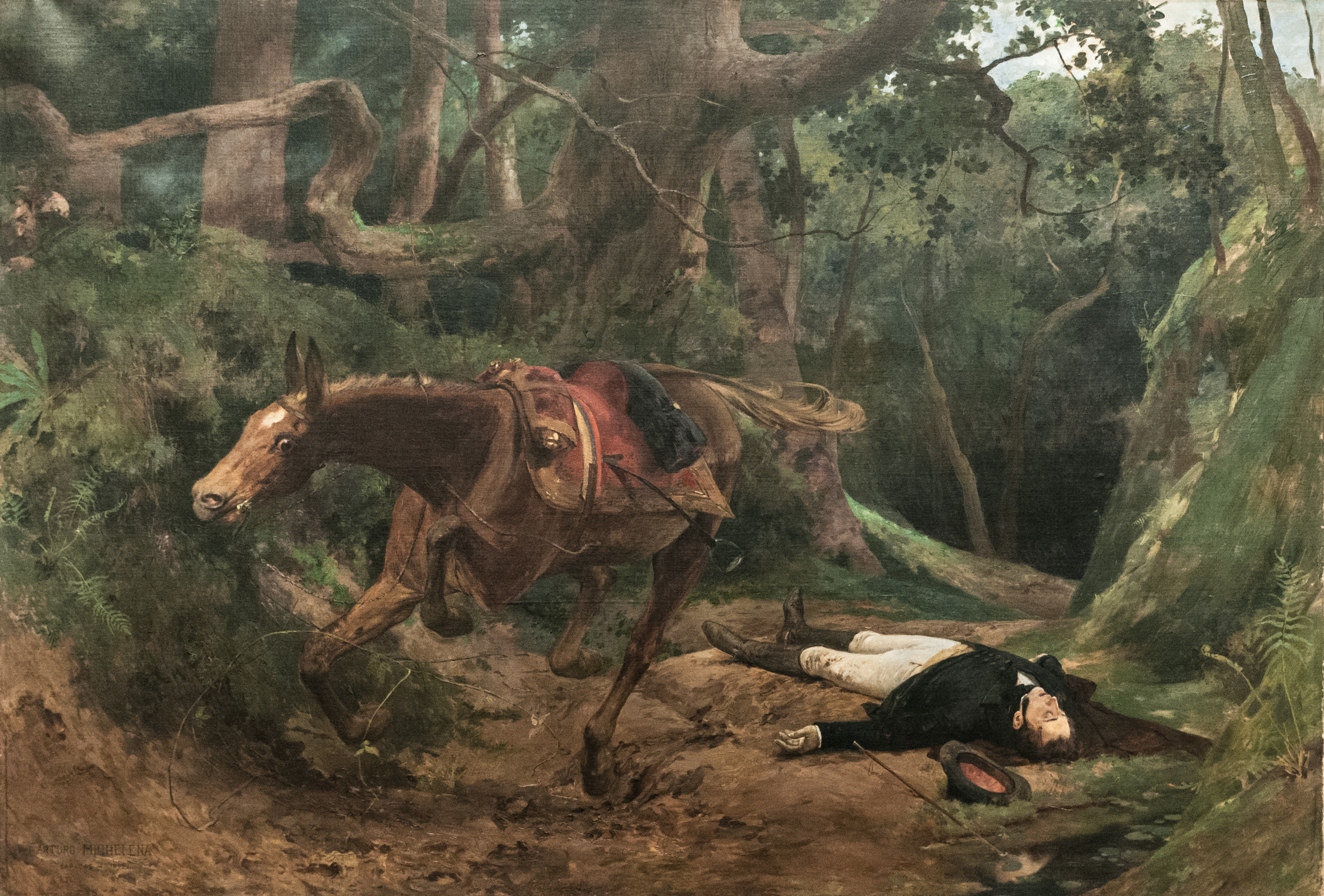
Death of Sucre in Berruecos, 1895

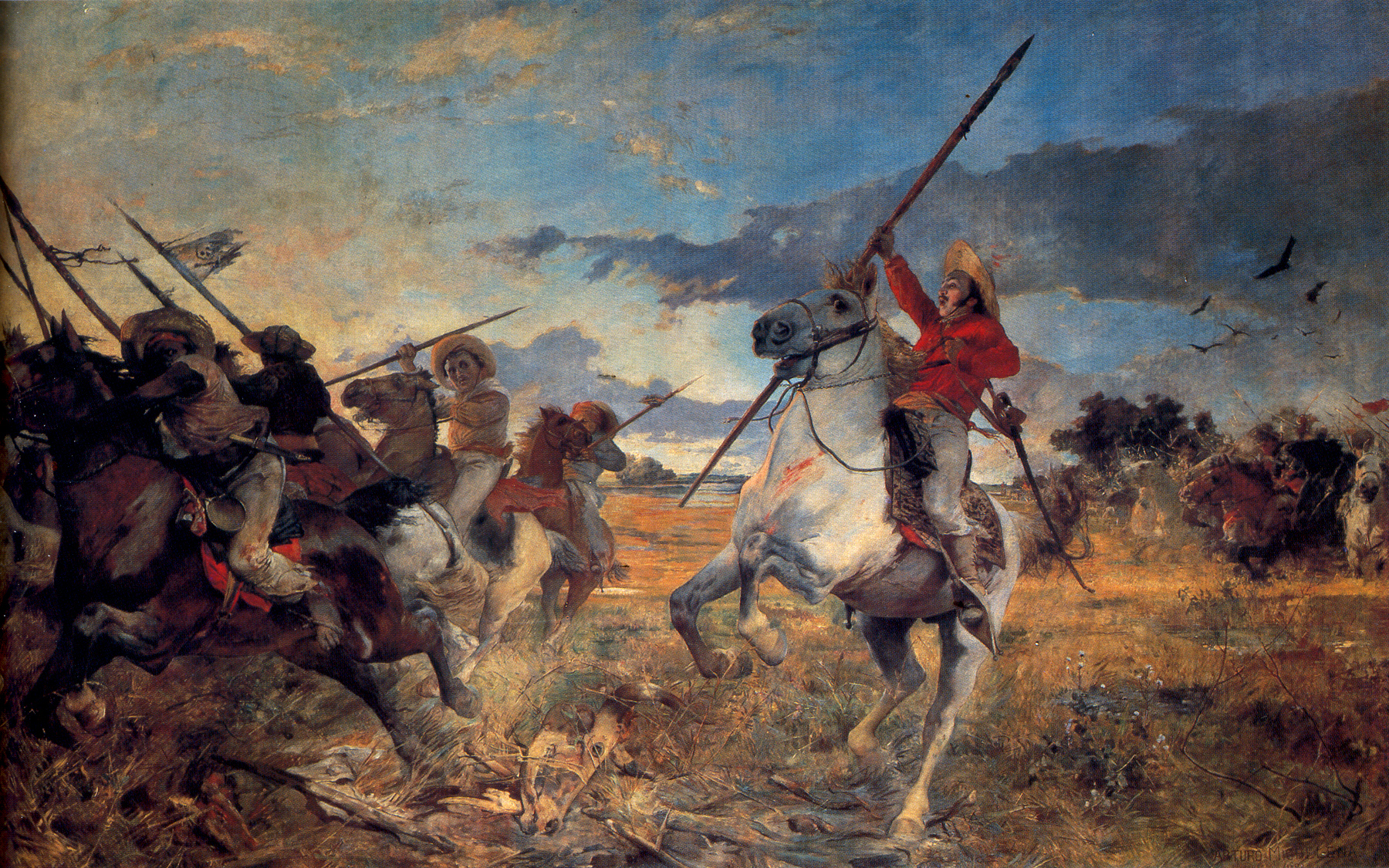
Vuelvan Caras (About Face)

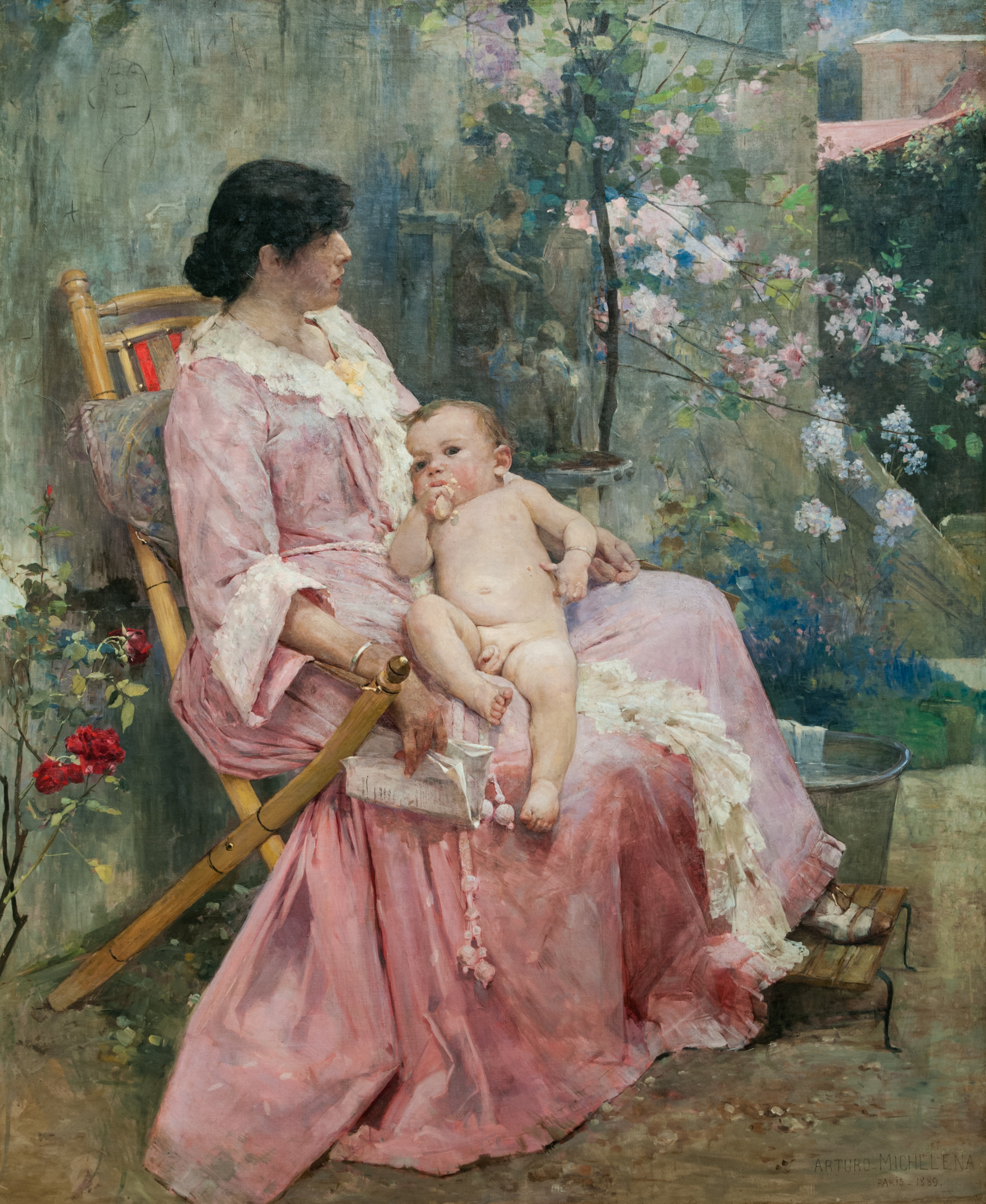
La Joven Madre (The Young Mother), 1889
