= José Mires =

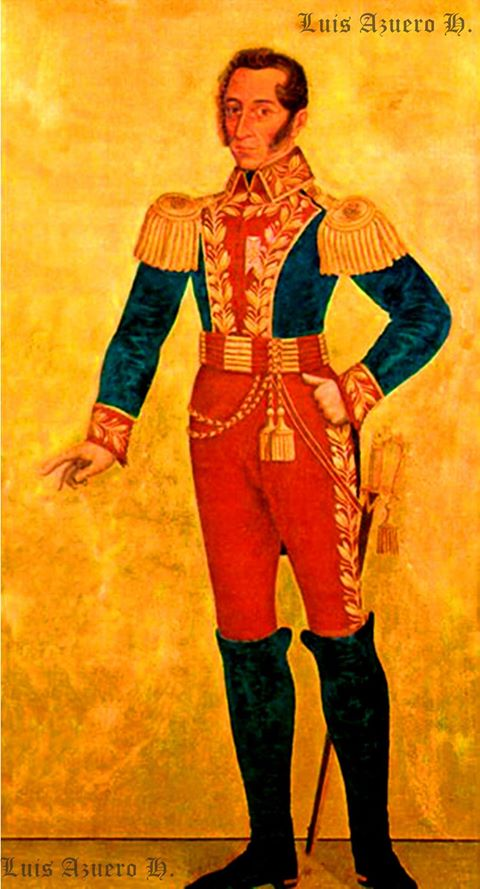
General José Mires by Antonio Salas Avilés (1824).

José Mires (Ireland, around 1785 – Samborondón, March 1829) was a military born in Ireland as John Mires, who fought in the Spanish American wars of independence.

== Biography ==
From an early age he settled in Venezuela where he enthusiastically embraced the cause of independence from Spain. In 1810, he joined the Patriot army and fought tirelessly in the campaigns of Colombia and Venezuela.

After the fall of the First Republic of Venezuela in 1812, he was captured and sent along with other Patriots to the dungeons of the Spanish prisons in Ceuta, Africa, from where he managed to escape to immediately return to South America and continue his fight for freedom.

In 1821 he arrived in Guayaquil as second officer of General Antonio José de Sucre, and on 19 August of that same year he led the Patriot troops that defeated the Royalists in the Battle of Yaguachi. Shortly afterwards, on 12 September, he was taken prisoner in the Second Battle of Huachi.

After regaining his freedom, he rejoined the Patriot army and intervened in the Battle of Pichincha, which definitively sealed the Ecuadorian independence. Later he was sent to the north to participate in the Pasto Campaign, whose population he managed to subdue. After the end of the war, he returned to Guayaquil where he tried to settle permanently.

During the Gran Colombia–Peru War, Mires, as a former Division General, was given the position of commander of the then insignificant village of Samborondón, having no more under his command than a lieutenant (Luna) and twenty-five recruits. There he was attacked by a Peruvian column commanded by a certain Bustamante, who ordered his capture and immediate execution.
