= Esther Morales =

Bolivian grocer, businessperson, and public figure (1949–2020)

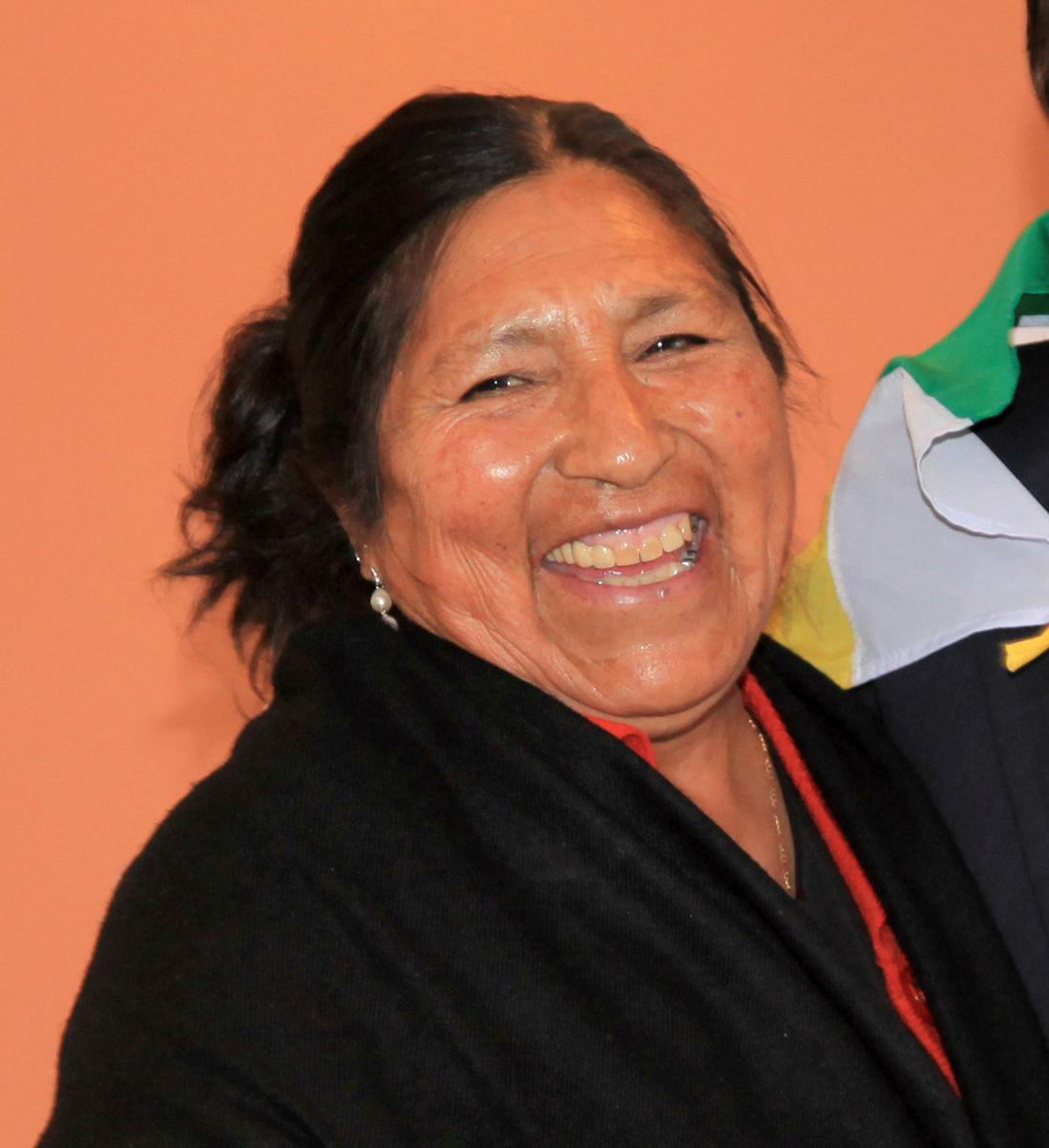
- Esther Morales in September 2012

First Lady of Bolivia
- In role 22 January 2006 – 10 November 2019
- President: Evo Morales
- Preceded by: Fanny Elena Arguedas
- Succeeded by: Héctor Hincapié Carvajal (as First Gentleman)

Personal details
- Born: Esther Morales Ayma; 13 November 1949 Orinoca, Bolivia
- Died: 16 August 2020 (aged 70) Oruro, Bolivia
- Spouse: Ponciano Willcarani (?–2020; her death)
- Children: Three

Esther Morales Ayma de Willacarani (13 November 1949 – 16 August 2020) was a Bolivian grocer, businesswoman and political activist. In 2006, she was designated to the role of First Lady of Bolivia by her younger brother, then-President of Bolivia Evo Morales, who was unmarried.

== Biography ==
Morales was born in Orinoca, Oruro Department, on 13 November 1949, to a family from the indigenous Aymara people. One of seven children born to Dionisio Morales Choque and María Ayma Mamani, only Esther and two of her siblings, Evo and Hugo, survived past childhood. She was originally supposed to be named "Estefanía Morales", but her father decided to name her Esther at the last minute (likewise, her brother, Evo Morales, was supposed to be called "Evaristo" before their father changed his mind.)

Her family were farmers and Morales spent her youth farming and herding llamas. Esther Morales, who had to leave elementary school when she was just 8-years old, was also responsible for raising her younger brothers, including Evo, when their mother died. Later in life, then-President Evo Morales said that he viewed her as his own mother.

Esther Morales continued to work in agriculture into adulthood. She eventually moved to Oruro, Bolivia, where she sold groceries and llama meat from a small store located in her home. Morales married Ponciano Willcarani, a musician, with whom she had three children - Ademar, Marcelo, and Roger.

In December 2005, her brother, Evo Morales, was elected president of Bolivia. President Evo Morales was unmarried throughout his presidency and questions arose if Bolivia would have an acting first lady, or its equivalent. Shortly before his 2006 presidential inauguration, Morales pointedly told reporters that "la primera dama es Bolivia", ("the first lady is Bolivia"), when asked about the position during a visit to Chapare. Still, in January 2006, he announced that his older sister, Esther Morales, who was still working as a small scale grocer at the time, would assume the role of acting First Lady of Bolivia for official functions and protocol events.

Esther Morales, then 55-years old, appeared at her first event as Bolivia's first lady-designate on 21 January 2006, one day before her brother's inauguration, when she visited Tiwanaku, a historic Pre-Columbian indigenous site near Lake Titicaca. On 8 March 2006, Esther Morales closed her store in Oruro and traveled by bus to the Casa Grande del Pueblo in La Paz to attend a presidential ceremony honoring Bolivian women. She told reporters at the event, "They told me it's my first official function, although I haven't been confirmed as First Lady yet... I've been having to learn all the protocol. I don't think I'll ever wear make-up or high heels. They'll just have to take me as I am." She also spoke of wanting to meet U.S. President George W. Bush, a frequent critic of President Morales and his policies, "I don't think [President George] Bush likes us. But I would like to meet him... I want to help all the poor people who live in America too. I always thought everyone there was rich. But now I've heard that's not true."

Observers noted that the appointment of his sister to acting First Lady indicated that President Morales wanted to focus on the poor and Indigenous peoples in Bolivia. The Daily Telegraph wrote in March 2006 that, "Her elevation is a strong indication that her brother aims to define his period in power as the peasant presidency. Dona Esther is expected to represent the feminine side of his project, to become a mother figure to the poor."

Average Bolivians were quick to embrace Morales as the country's new first lady, though there was some resistance to Esther Morales' position from members of the Morales government and critics within the ruling Movement for Socialism (MAS) party. She dismissed this criticism saying, "They don't want me there watching for the ones who are corrupt." Esther Morales spoke of her excitement at the prospect of official travel to represent Bolivia abroad, though she admitted she had much to learn in-role. Speaking of a forthcoming official trip to South Korea, she explained, "I didn't know there was a North and South. I thought it was all one thing."

In the 2000s and 2010s, Esther Morales actively participated in official domestic and international events as acting first lady in support of her brother's government. She met with foreign dignitaries, traveled to South Korea, and represented Bolivia at a women's conference in the United Kingdom. Morales also spoke in favor of Bolivia's maritime claims to territory in neighboring Chile.

In January 2012, First Lady Morales met with members of the Bolivian immigrant community at the Casa Amèrica Catalunya in Barcelona, Spain. (There were an estimated 55,000 Bolivians in Catalonia and 200,000 immigrants across Spain in 2012). In her speech at the Casa Amèrica Catalunya, Morales defended many of Evo Morales policies, saying, "The landowners and businessmen of Bolivia are upset with Evo because he works for the poor. Before, the Constitution of the country only spoke of the rich who have money and now it speaks of the poor." She also noted that it is mainly Bolivian women who had emigrated to Spain and other countries in search of work.

In 2013, President Evo Morales suddenly reversed his earlier decision and largely removed Esther Morales from her most public, high-profile roles. In the announcement, Morales directly contradicted earlier statements that he had appointed his sister as first lady and called the title of first lady "an insult to women". Morales argued that he did not want to favor his sister over other family members, including his daughter, Eva Liz Morales, who sometimes filled in for her aunt. President Morales admitted that his decision made his sister cry.

Despite the president's public reversal, Esther Morales continued to serve as the acting first lady (or its equivalent) for several years, though in a diminished capacity. Morales retired from public life during the later years of her brother's presidency.

During the November 2019 Bolivian political crisis, which resulted in the exile of President Evo Morales, demonstrators set fire to Esther Morales' small home and store in Oruro. Esther Morales also fled the country following her brother's resignation on 10 November 2019. She briefly stayed in Mexico before returning to Bolivia.

In August 2020, Morales began exhibiting symptoms of COVID-19 during the COVID-19 pandemic in Bolivia, including breathing difficulties. She had initially been treated in the emergency room of San Juan de Dios General Hospital, but was not admitted due to a shortage of beds in the intensive care unit. Relatives unsuccessfully tried to have her admitted to several private clinics and hospitals, but they reportedly could not reach them due to road blocks and political unrest in the region. On 9 August 2020, Morales, who had pre-existing health conditions, was finally admitted to Oruro Corea Hospital's intensive care unit, a public hospital, for treatment of COVID-19, but her condition continued to deteriorate. She developed severe complications associated with coronavirus, including respiratory failure, renal failure, septic shock, and sepsis.

Esther Morales died from complications of COVID-19 on Sunday, 16 August 2020, at the age of 70, at the Oruro hospital. She was survived by her husband, Ponciano Willcarani and their three sons, Ademar, Marcelo, and Roger. Morales was buried in her hometown of Orinoca.

== Bibliography ==
- Gutsch, Jochen-Martin (5 February 2006). "Indian, Coca Farmer, Bolivian President". Der Spiegel. Germany: SPIEGEL-Verlag.
- Harten, Sven (2011). The Rise of Evo Morales and the MAS. London and New York: Zed Books. ISBN 978-1-84813-523-9.
- Sivak, Martín (2010). Evo Morales: The Extraordinary Rise of the First Indigenous President of Bolivia. New York: Palgrave MacMillan. ISBN 978-0-230-62305-7.
- Webber, Jeffrey R. (2011). From Rebellion to Reform in Bolivia: Class Struggle, Indigenous Liberation, and the Politics of Evo Morales. Haymarket Books. ISBN 978-1608461066.

Honorary titles
| Preceded by Fanny Elena Arguedas | First Lady of Bolivia; 2006–2019 | Succeeded by Héctor Hincapié Carvajal as First Gentleman |
