= La Libertad, Quito =

Coordinates: 0.2923°S 78.5746°W

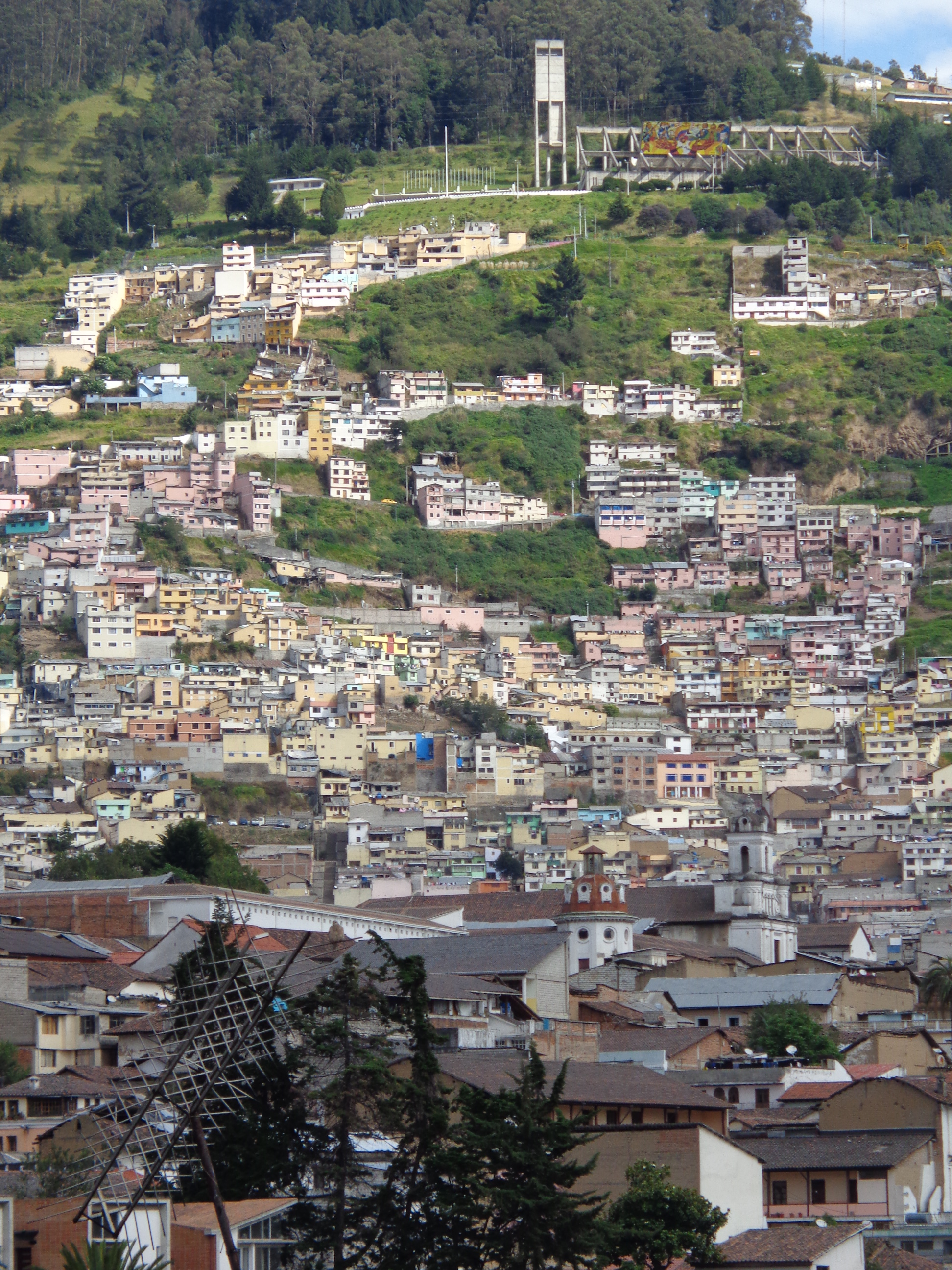

La Libertad is an urban parish in the city of Quito, Ecuador. It is located in the southern part of the city, just south of the city center and on the slopes of the Pichincha volcano.

La Cima de La Libertad, a military museum that sits on the location of the Battle of Pichincha, is located within this parish.
