= Battle of Yaguachi =

Part of the Ecuadorian War of Independence

- Part of the Ecuadorian War of Independence
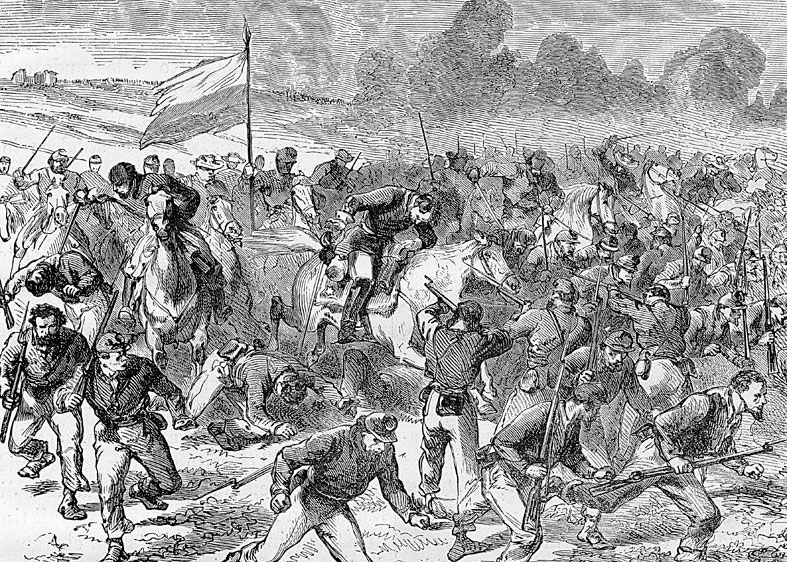
- Battle of Yaguachi 1821
Date	19 August 1821
Location	Cone near Yaguachi, Ecuador 2°10′14″S 79°39′01″W
Result	Patriot victory

Belligerents
Gran Colombia; Free Province of Guayaquil	Kingdom of Spain

Commanders and leaders
Antonio José de Sucre; José Mires	Melchor Aymerich; Francisco González

Strength
1,200 men	1,000 men

Casualties and losses
20 killed 25 wounded	400 killed or wounded 500 prisoners

The Battle of Yaguachi or Battle of Cone was a military confrontation that occurred on 19 August 1821 between Guayaquil independence troops and Grancolombian reinforcements, led by Antonio José de Sucre, against Royalist troops led by Colonel Francisco González. The battle was fought near the city of Yaguachi, current Province of Guayas in Ecuador, and was a victory for the Patriots which ensured the definitive independence of the Free Province of Guayaquil.

== Prelude ==
In 1820, Patriots in Guayaquil had established of the Free Province of Guayaquil and raised an army that marched to the capital Quito. But after winning the Battle of Camino Real, the Guayaquil army was defeated three times and forced to retreat to Guayaquil.
The Junta de Guayaquil now requested help from General Simón Bolívar, president of Gran Colombia, who sent General Antonio José de Sucre with an army and a large supply of weapons.

In July 1821, Sucre was deploying his army in Babahoyo, ready to advance on the highlands as soon as the weather allowed. Meanwhile, Spanish General Melchor Aymerich had reached Riobamba with 2,000 soldiers and established his headquarters in that city. He decided to divide his forces and attack on two fronts to execute a pincer movement: he would led his army from Guaranda down to Babahoyo, while Colonel González would come from the southern highlands down to Yaguachi to attack Sucre's flank.

== The battle ==
Upon discovering the Royalist intentions thanks to a well-developed espionage network, Sucre prepared a battle plan and on 19 August, he sent General José Mires to confront and stop Colonel González' army in the foothills of the mountain range. But when Mires found the Spanish at a short distance from Yaguachi, he noticed they were in a vulnerable situation. They were marching in a forest on a narrow path, that allowed only four men in a row. Mires concluded that he had to attack the Spanish column immediately, before they could take up a better position. He therefore engaged in combat at 11 a.m.

Putting himself at the head of the Guayaquileño second battalion and the Santander battalion of the Colombian auxiliaries, Mires gave such rapid and accurate volleys that he forced the enemy to retreat to try to reorganize. All the efforts that the Royalists made to sustain Mires' attacks were useless, as the Patriot battalions fought with true courage and heroism, forcing the Spanish – who also defended their positions with extreme courage – to retreat slowly. Finally the Royalists could not resist and were defeated.

== Consequences ==
Colonel González was able to escape with only 120 men, leaving on the battlefield 400 dead and wounded, more than 500 prisoners and a large quantity of weapons, ammunition and war supplies, which were later used by the Patriot army. Among the Patriots there were only 20 dead and 25 wounded.
Upon receiving word of the defeat, Aymerich headed back to the highlands.

== Sources ==
- Landázuri Camacho, Carlos. «La independencia del Ecuador (1808-1822)». A: Ayala Mora, Enrique. Nueva historia del Ecuador. Vol. 6. Quito: Corporación Editora Nacional, 1989.
- Destruge, Camilo. Historia de la Revolución de Octubre y campaña libertadora de 1820–22. 2a ed. Guayaquil: Banco Central del Ecuador, 1982.
- Chacón Izurieta, Galo. Historia militar del Ecuador (1820-1823). Quito: ENA, 1978.
