= Antonio José de Sucre =

President of Peru and Bolivia (1795–1830)

- Portrait by Arturo Michelena, 1895

2nd President of Bolivia
- In office 29 December 1825 – 18 April 1828 (Note: On 18 April 1828, Sucre delegated command to the council of ministers, presided by José María Pérez de Urdininea. At that time, Sucre did not resign. It was not until 2 August that he presented his definitive resignation to the Congress.)
- Preceded by: Simón Bolívar
- Succeeded by: José María Pérez de Urdininea (acting)

Supreme Military Chief of Peru
- In office 23 June 1823 – 17 July 1823
- Preceded by: José de la Riva Agüero
- Succeeded by: José Bernardo de Tagle

Personal details
- Born: Antonio José de Sucre y Alcalá; 3 February 1795 Cumaná, Captaincy General of Venezuela, Spanish Empire (now Cumaná, Venezuela)
- Died: 4 June 1830 (aged 35) Outside Pasto, New Granada (now Arboleda, Colombia)
- Cause of death: Assassination by gunshots
- Resting place: Cathedral of Quito
- Citizenship: Spanish (1795–1810); Venezuelan (1817–1819); Colombian (1819–1830)
- Party: Independent
- Other political affiliations: Affiliated with the Bolivarians
- Spouse: Maríana de Carcelén y Larrea, Marquise of Solanda
- Children: Teresa Sucre y Carcelén
- Honorary title: Gran Mariscal de Ayacucho

Military service
- Battles/wars: Spanish American wars of independence; Venezuelan War of Independence; Colombian War of Independence; Pasto Campaign; First Battle of the Cuchilla de Taindalá; Second Battle of the Cuchilla de Taindalá; Ecuadorian War of Independence; Battle of Yaguachi; Second Battle of Huachi; Battle of Riobamba; Battle of Pichincha; Peruvian War of Independence; Battle of Junín; Battle of Corpahuaico; Battle of Ayacucho; Gran Colombia-Peru War; Battle of Tarqui

Antonio José de Sucre y Alcalá (Spanish pronunciation: [anˈtonjo xoˈse ðe ˈsukɾej alkaˈla]; 3 February 1795 – 4 June 1830), known as the "Gran Mariscal de Ayacucho" (English: "Grand Marshal of Ayacucho"), was a Venezuelan general and politician who served as the president of Bolivia from 1825 to 1828. A close friend and associate of Simón Bolívar, he was one of the primary leaders of South America's struggle for independence from the Spanish Empire.

Born to an aristocratic family in Cumaná, Sucre joined the revolt against Spanish rule in 1814 and quickly established himself as a highly capable military leader. In 1822, he led the Patriot forces to triumph at the Battle of Pichincha and liberated Quito, from which modern Ecuador would eventually emerge. As Bolívar's chief lieutenant, he went on to score a decisive victory over the Spanish Royalist army at the Battle of Ayacucho in 1824, which effectively secured the independence of Peru. Afterwards he moved into Upper Peru, pacified the Royalist resistance and set up an administration on Bolívar's orders. The region achieved independence as the Bolivia, and Sucre was inaugurated as president of the new republic after Bolívar passed on the duty.

Sucre's tenure as president was beset by difficulties, and opposition to his rule mounted as the populace turned against Bolívar and his followers. He was forced to resign in 1828, but was recalled to military duty on the outbreak of the Gran Colombia–Peru War, in which he commanded Colombian forces and fought the Peruvian invaders to a standstill. He was assassinated in Berruecos, Colombia in 1830, and the identity of the conspirators remains a subject of historical speculation.

== Family ==
The aristocratic Sucre family traces its roots back to origins in Flanders. It arrived in Venezuela through Charles de Sucre y Franco Perez, a Flemish nobleman, son of Charles Adrian de Sucre, Marquess of Peru and Buenaventura Carolina Isabel Garrido y Pardo, a Spanish noblewoman. Charles de Sucre y Pardo served as a soldier in Catalonia in 1698 and was later named Governor of Cartagena de Indias and Captain General of Cuba. On 22 December 1779, Charles de Sucre y Pardo arrived in Cumaná, Venezuela, having been named Governor of New Andalucia, which includes present-day Sucre State.

== Military career ==
In 1814, Antonio José de Sucre joined the fight for South American independence from Spain. The Battle of Pichincha took place on 24 May 1822, on the slopes of the Pichincha volcano, near Quito in what is now Ecuador. The encounter, fought in the context of the Spanish American wars of independence, pitted a Patriot army under Sucre against a Royalist army commanded by Field Marshal Melchor Aymerich. The defeat of the Royalist forces brought about the liberation of Quito and secured the independence of the provinces belonging to the Real Audiencia de Quito, or Presidencia de Quito, the Spanish colonial administrative jurisdiction from which the Republic of Ecuador would eventually emerge. As of late 1824, Royalists still had control of most of southern Peru as well as Real Felipe Fort in the port of Callao. On 9 December 1824, the Battle of Ayacucho took place at Pampa de La Quinua, near the town of Quinua, between Royalist and Patriot forces. Sucre, as Simón Bolívar's lieutenant, led the Patriot forces to victory over the Viceroy José de la Serna, who was wounded. After the battle, second commander-in-chief José de Canterac signed the final capitulation of the Royalist army on his behalf. As a result, he was promoted, at the request of the Peruvian Congress, to Marshal and as General in Chief by the Colombian legislature.

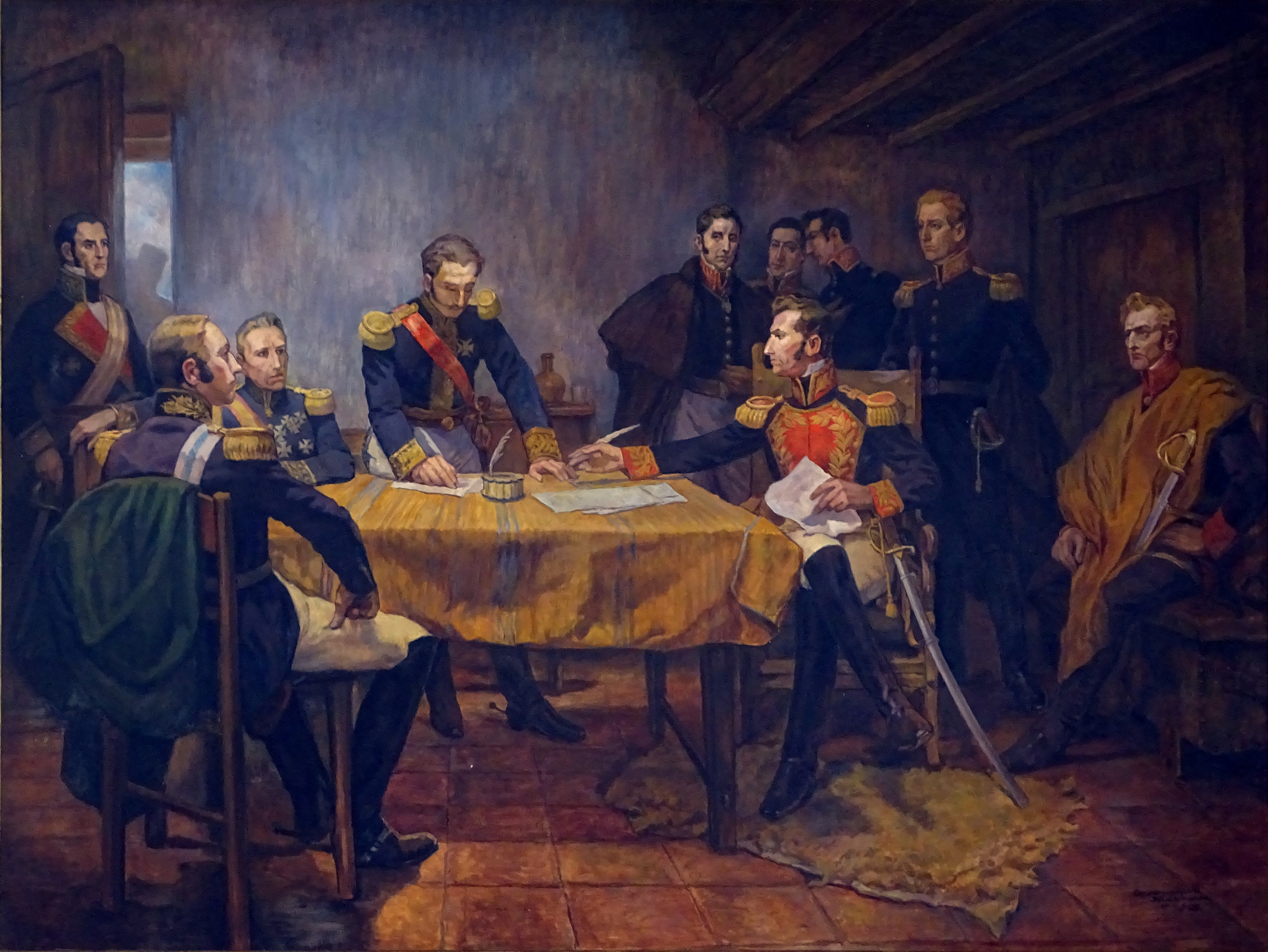
Surrender at Ayacucho by Daniel Hernández.

After the victory at Ayacucho, following precise orders from Bolívar, Sucre, nominated as Ayacucho's Grand Marshal, entered Upper Peru (known today as Bolivia) territory on 25 February 1825. Besides having orders of installing an immediately independent administration, his role was limited to giving an appearance of legality to the process that Upper Peruvians themselves had begun already.

Royalist general Pedro Antonio Olañeta stayed in Potosí, where he received by January the "Union" Infantry Battalion coming from Puno under the command of colonel José María Valdez. Olañeta then summoned a War Council, which agreed to continue the resistance in the name of Ferdinand VII. Next, Olañeta distributed his troops between Cotagaita fortress with the "Chichas" Battalion. in charge of colonel Medinacelli, while Valdez was sent to Chuquisaca with the "Union" Infantry Battalion and loyalist militias, and Olañeta himself marched toward Vitichi, with 60,000 pieces of gold from the Coin House in Potosí. But for the Spanish military personnel in Upper Peru, it was too little too late, as since 1821 all out guerilla warfare had raged in this part of the continent.

However, in Cochabamba the First Battalion of the Infantry Regiment "Ferdinand VII", led by colonel José Martínez, rebelled and sided with the independence movement, only to be followed later by the Second Battalion, "Ferdinand VII" Infantry Regiment in Vallegrande, resulting in the forced resignation of Brigadier Francisco Aguilera on 12 February. Royalist colonel José Manuel Mercado occupied Santa Cruz de la Sierra on 14 February, as Chayanta stayed in the hands of lieutenant colonel Pedro Arraya, with the cavalry squadrons "Santa Victoria" (Holy Victory) and "Dragones Americanos" (American Dragoons), and in Chuquisaca the cavalry squadron "Dragones de la Frontera"(Frontier Dragoons) under colonel Francisco López claimed victory for the independence forces on 22 February. At this point, the majority of royalist troops of Upper Peru refused to continue fighting against the powerful army of Sucre and switched allegiances. Colonel Medinacelli with 300 soldiers also revolted against Olañeta, and on 2 April 1825 they faced each other in the Battle of Tumusla, which ended with the death of Olañeta. A few days later, on 7 April, general José Mario Valdez surrendered in Chequelte to general Urdininea, putting an end to the war in Upper Peru and signalling victory to the local independence movement which had been active since 1811.

== Role in the foundation of Bolivia ==
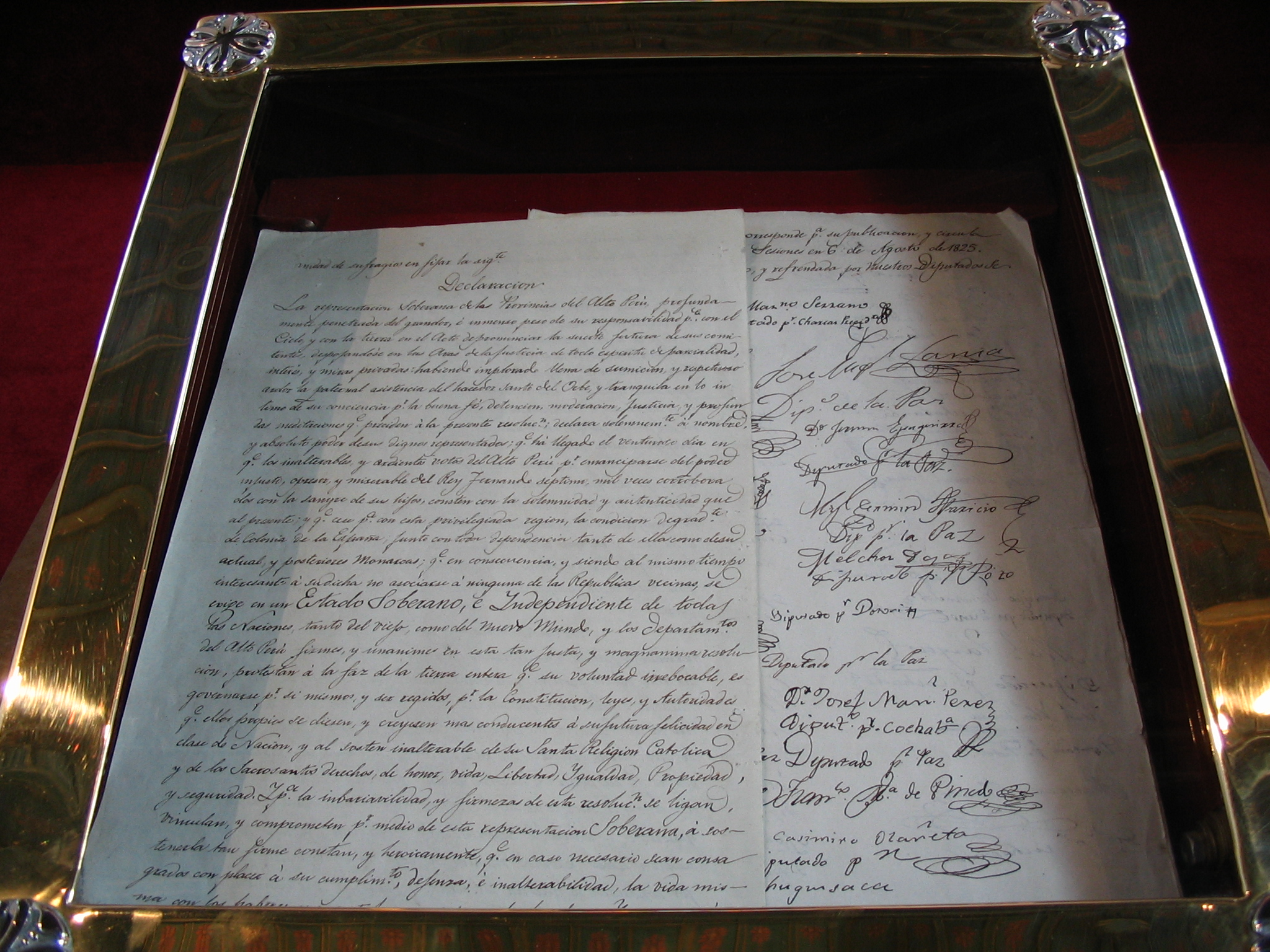
Bolivian Independence Act at Casa de la Libertad, Sucre.

After the Constituent Assembly in Chuquisaca was reconvened by Marshal Sucre on 8 July 1825 and later concluded, it was determined the complete independence of Upper Peru under the republican form. Finally, the Assembly president José Mariano Serrano, together with a commission, wrote down the "Independence Act of the Upper Peruvian Departments" which carries the date of 6 August 1825, in honor of the Battle of Junín won by Bolívar. Independence was declared by 7 representatives from Charcas, 14 from Potosí, 12 from La Paz, 13 from Cochabamba and 2 from Santa Cruz. The act of Independence, wrote by the president of the Congress, Serrano, states in its expositive part:

"The world knows that the land of Upper Peru has been, in the American continent, the altar where the free people shed the first blood, and the land where the last of the tyrants’ tombs finally lays. Today, the Upper Peruvian departments protest in the face of the whole Earth its irrevocable resolution to be governed by themselves."

Through a decree it was determined that the new state in Upper Peru would carry the name of "República Bolívar", in honor of the liberator, who was designated as "Father of the Republic and Supreme Chief of State". Bolívar thanked them for these honors, but declined the presidency of the Republic, a duty he gave instead to the victor of Ayacucho, Grand Marshal Sucre, who would later be sworn in the same day as the first President of Bolivia. After some time, the subject of the name of the young nation arose again, and a Potosían deputy named Manuel Martín Cruz offered a solution, suggesting that in the same manner which from Romulus comes Rome, from Bolívar ought to come the new nation of Bolivia.

"If from Romulus, Rome; from Bolívar, it is Bolivia".

When Bolívar got the news of the decision, he felt flattered by the young nation, but until then he had not willingly accepted Upper Peru's independence because he was worried about its future, due to Bolivia's location in the center of South America. According to Bolívar, this would create a nation that would face many future wars. Bolívar wished that Bolivia would become part of another nation, preferably Peru (given the fact that it had been part of Viceroyalty of Peru for centuries), or Argentina (since during the last decades of colonial domain it had been part of Viceroyalty of the Río de la Plata), but what deeply convinced him otherwise was the attitude of the people. On 18 August, upon his arrival to La Paz, there was a demonstration of popular rejoicing. The same scene repeated when the Liberator arrived to Oruro, then to Potosí and finally to Chuquisaca, where he met his lieutenant of many years once more. Such a fervent demonstration by the people touched Bolívar, who called the new nation his "Predilect Daughter" and was called by the peoples of the new republic their "Favorite Son."

After the foundation of Bolivia, he became also the commander in chief of the Armed Forces of Bolivia, which he created the following day on the basis of the guerrilla forces and active Patriot armies stationed at the time of the declaration. He gave the young republic its first Constitution in 1828.

== Battle of Tarqui ==
In the Battle of Tarqui, fought on 27 February 1829, heavily outnumbered two to one, Sucre defeated a Peruvian invasion force led by third President and General of Peru José de La Mar, whose intentions had been to annex Guayaquil and the rest of Ecuador to Peru.

== Post-independence ==
When a strong movement arose against Bolívar, his followers, and the Bolivian constitution in 1828, Sucre resigned.

== Death ==
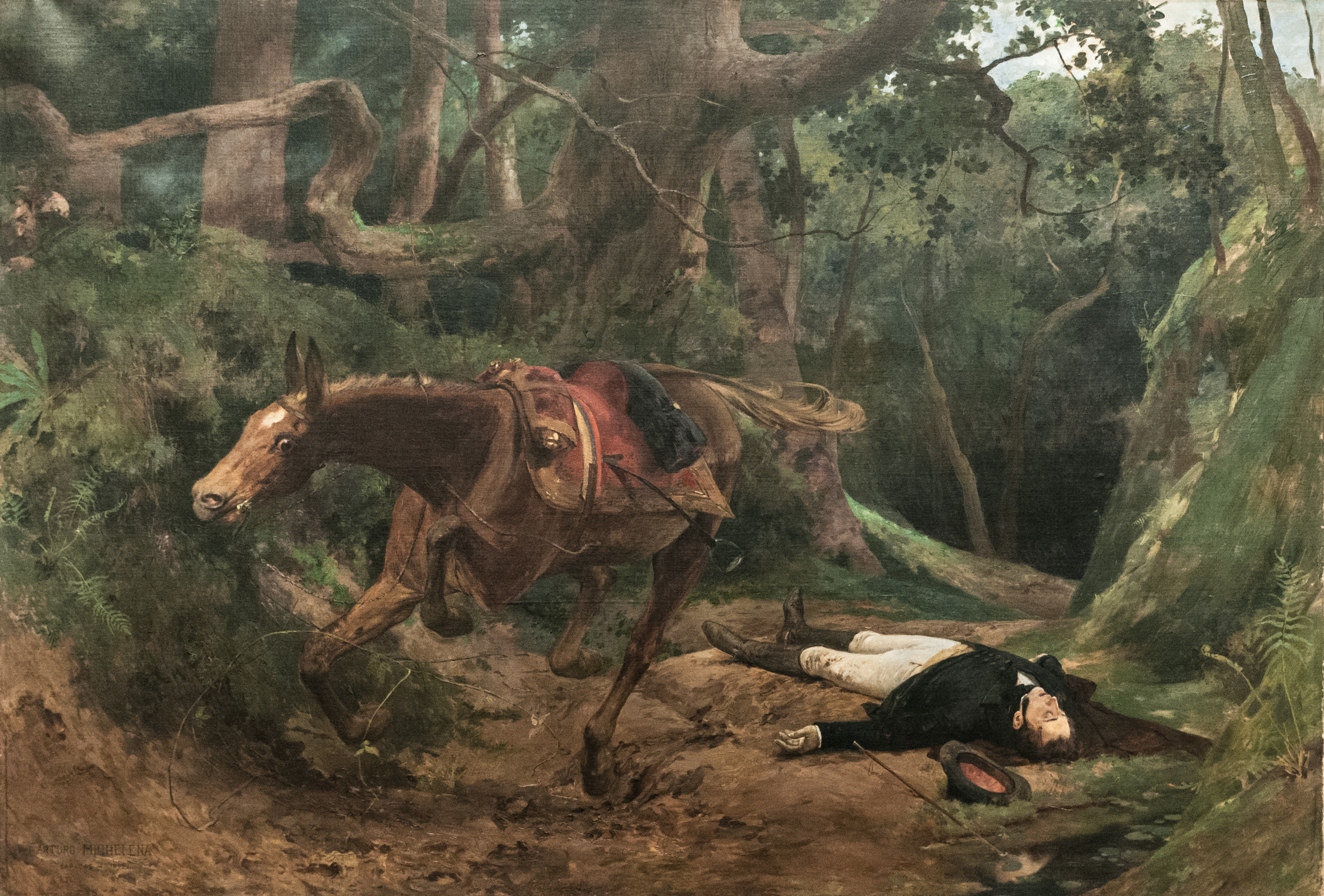
Murder of Antonio José de Sucre by Arturo Michelena.

Sucre was killed on 4 June 1830. General Juan José Flores wanted to separate the southern departments (Quito, Guayaquil, and Azuay), called the District of Ecuador, from Gran Colombia so as to form an independent country and become its first President. General Flores believed that if Sucre arrived in Quito from Bogotá, he could thwart his plans, since Sucre was very popular due to his reputation as a hero and leader in the Battles of Pichincha, Tarqui and Ayacucho. Flores put himself in contact with the anti-Bolívar and anti-Sucre leader Brigadier-General and the Commanding General of Cauca, José María Obando, who was not present at Sucre's death but who delegated this criminal act to the Venezuelan Colonel Apolinar Morillo, Commander Juan Gregorio Sarria (who later confessed he had been paid by Obando), José Erazo (a highway bandit and guerrilla fighter), and three peons as accomplices. The plan was to ambush José Antonio de Sucre on the morning of June 4, 1830, in the cold and bleak forested district of Berruecos, along a narrow path that was perennially covered with fog.

The five assassins were hiding behind trees along the part of the trail known as La Jacoba waiting for Sucre's party, which would be passing the area single file. Sucre's retinue comprised seven persons: two muleteers with the baggage, two sergeants, one being the Marshal's orderly, a representative to the Congress from Cuenca, and his servant, and finally Sucre himself. When Sucre approached La Jacoba, he was struck by three bullets, two inflicting superficial wounds to his head and one piercing his heart. He fell from his horse, which had been shot in the neck, and died almost instantly. His body remained there for twenty-four hours, as his companions, fearful of a similar fate, had fled in panic.

Later, Sarria and Morillo confessed that it was Obando who had convinced them to assassinate Sucre. Sarria also confessed that Obando had paid him to kill Sucre, since there were anti-Bolívar politicians and officers in Bogotá that wanted to see both Bolívar and Sucre eliminated. The ringleader of the anti-Bolívar faction in Bogotá was Francisco de Paula Santander, who had previously given a military position to Obando and remained his associate. Santander has also been implicated (without direct proof) as a conspirator in the attempt to assassinate Bolívar on September 25, 1828. Following a quick military trial in which he was sentenced to death, Santander was granted leniency via the Council of Ministers, and despite having reservations Bolívar commuted Santander's sentence and exiled him instead until his return to New Granada in 1832. The three peons who were part of the Sucre assassination party were poisoned by Morillo to prevent them from testifying about Sucre's murder. In the end, Morillo was convicted and shot in the main square of Bogotá for the murder of Sucre on 30 November 1842, and Erazo died in prison that same year. Obando was granted immunity due to the fact that he was too powerful in the Cauca Department.

=== Burial and aftermath ===
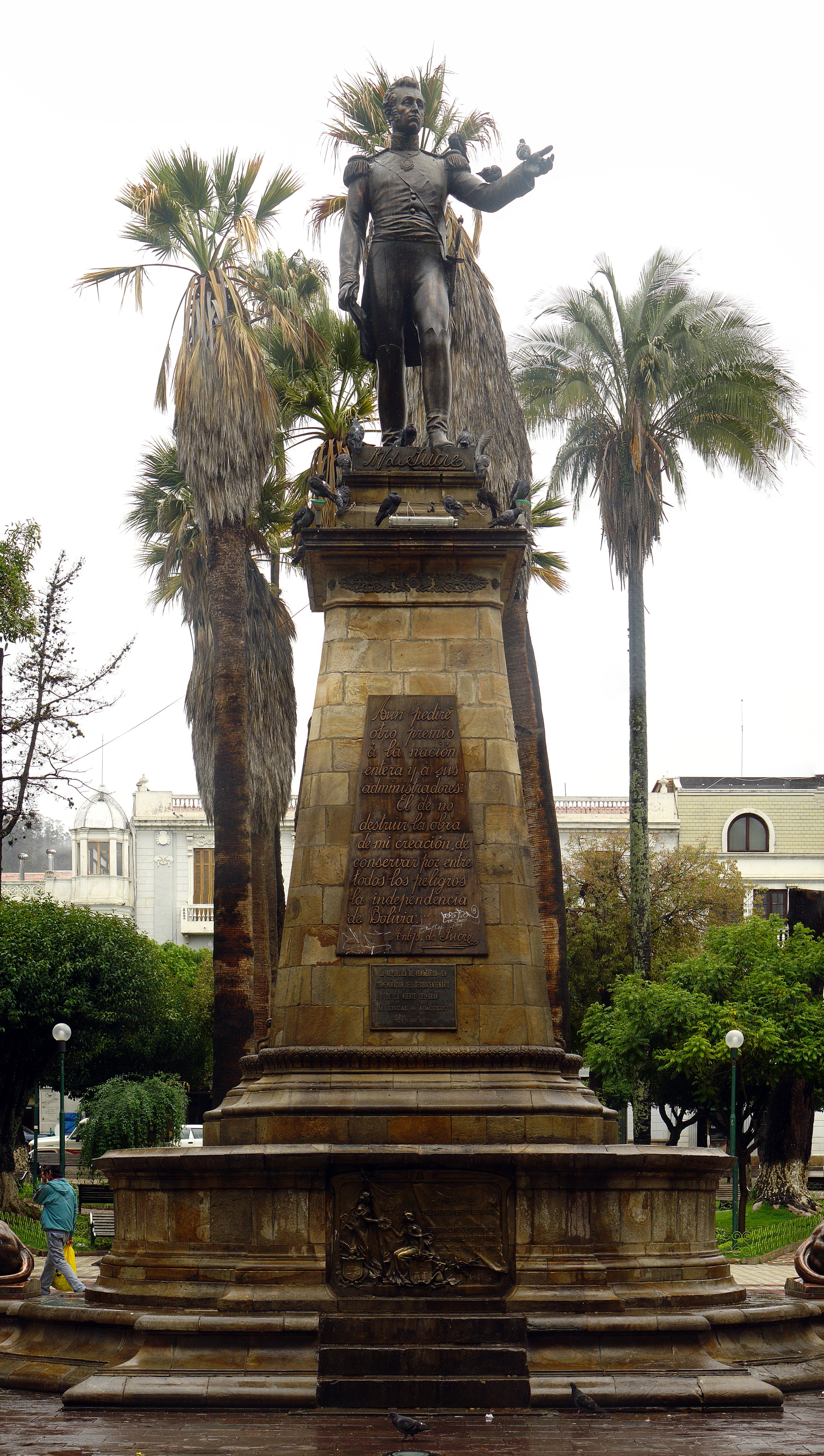
Monument to Antonio José de Sucre in the constitutional capital of Bolivia, Sucre

The following day Sucre's orderly, a sergeant named Lorenzo Caicedo, with some help from others, buried the body and marked the makeshift grave with a cross formed of branches. When the widow received news of the assassination, she promptly brought Sucre's remains from Berruecos to Quito, where they were interred in secret in the oratory of the chapel of "El Dean" on one of her haciendas. Subsequently, she had the remains transferred, also in secret, to the Carmen Bajo Convent in Quito, where they were placed facing the main altar of the church. Seventy years later, in April 1900, Sucre's remains were discovered and, their authenticity scrupulously verified, transferred to the Quito Cathedral on 4 June 1900, in a sumptuous parade led by the Executive and his Ministers, the high dignitaries of the Church, and the diplomatic corps. At the time, the government ordered the building of a crypt, but it was not inaugurated until thirty-two years later, on 4 August 1932. This mausoleum consisted of a nine-ton monolith of granite from the quarries of the Pichincha volcano. Its cover, on which a cross is carved in high relief, was so heavy that thirty persons were required to move it into place.

According to the 19 December 1830 Gaceta de Colombia, Issue No. 495, a power-hungry, ambitious General Obando paid an assassin to kill Sucre by falsely informing the assassin that Sucre was a traitor and had to be stopped because Sucre's intentions were to go to Quito and separate the Department of Cauca and the three southern departments of Colombia and unite them with Peru. In reality, Sucre, a protégé of Bolívar, was going to Quito to stop the separation of the District of Ecuador from Gran Colombia and to retire as soon as possible in Quito to live a quiet life with his wife. Some have argued that Sucre was ordered assassinated by Obando so as to leave no clear successor to Bolívar in Gran Colombia. Before his death, Bolívar believed Sucre to be the only man who could have reunited Gran Colombia; however, Bolívar's generals and the majority of the politicians running the separate departments of Gran Colombia had other selfish and ambitious plans. Sucre represented, according to historian Tomás Polanco Alcántara, "the indispensable complement to Simón Bolívar". Upon hearing the news of Sucre's death, Bolívar said, "Se ha derramado, Dios excelso, la sangre del inocente Abel..." ("The blood of the innocent Abel has been spilled, oh, Most High God..."). Bolívar later wrote (Gaceta de Colombia, 4 July 1830):

If he had breathed his spirit upon the theater of victory, with his last breath he would have given thanks to heaven for having given him a glorious death; but cowardly murdered in a dark mountain, he leaves his fatherland the duty of prosecuting this crime and of adopting measures that will curb new scandals and the repetition of scenes as lamentable and painful as this.

Sucre is buried in the Cathedral of Quito, Ecuador, as he had said, "I want my bones to be forever in Quito", where his wife, Mariana Carcelén, was from.

== Legacy ==
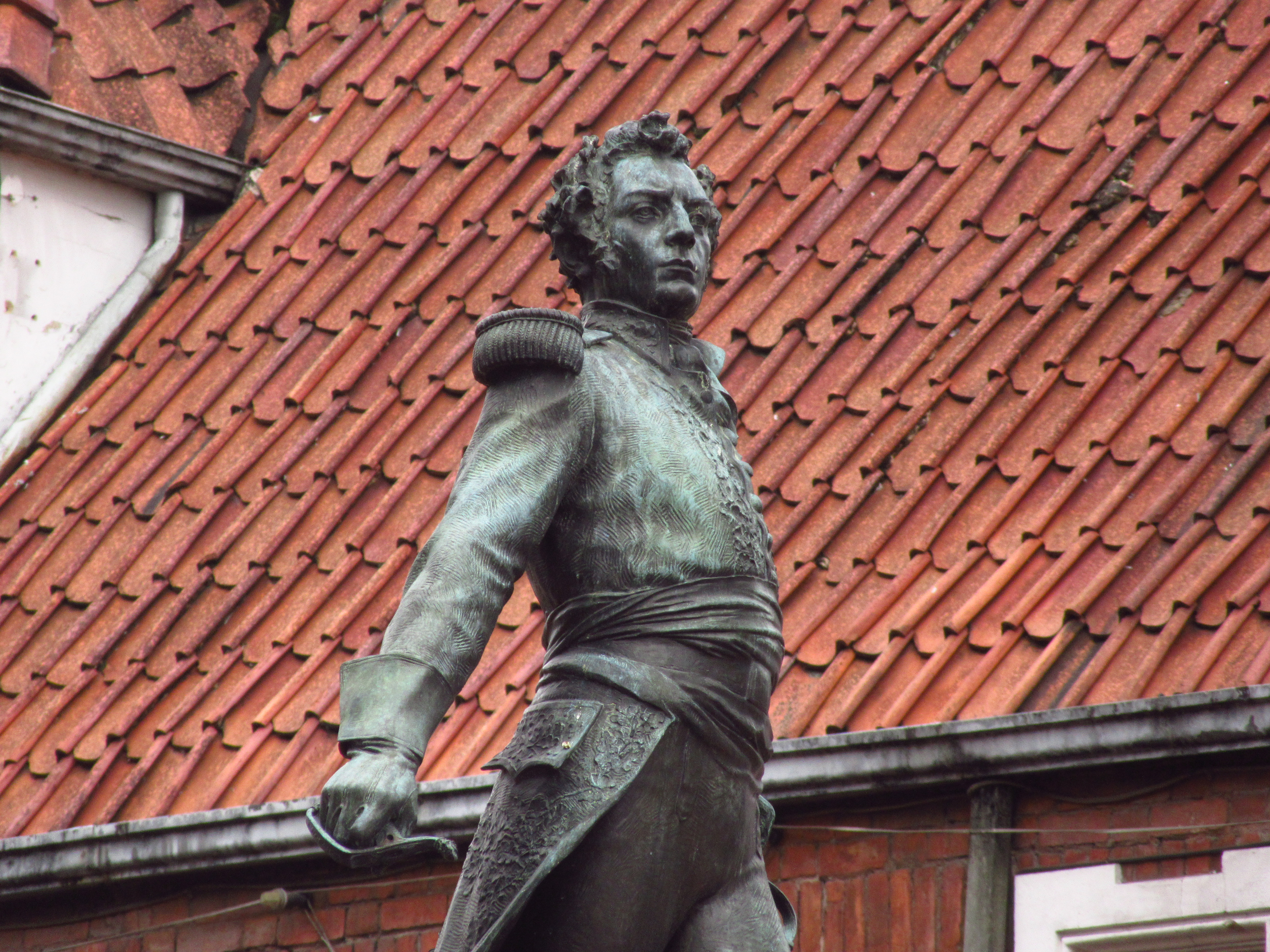
Statue in Bogotá

- Quito's airport was named after him.
- The Venezuelan Remote Sensing Satellite 2 (VRSS-2), launched in 2017, was named after him.
- Sucre Department in Colombia is named after him.
- Sucre State in Venezuela, which holds Cumana, is named after him.
- Sucre, the capital city of Bolivia, is named after him.
- He is featured as a Comandante General in Sid Meier's Civilization VI, available only to users playing as the Gran Colombia civilization.

Political offices
Preceded by Simón Bolívar	President of Bolivia; 1825–1828	Succeeded by José María Pérez de Urdininea; Interim
Preceded by José de la Riva Agüero	President of Peru; 1823	Succeeded by José Bernardo de Tagle
