= First ladies and gentlemen of Bolivia =

Spouse of the President

First Lady of Bolivia
- Incumbent; Maria Elena Urquidi since 8 November 2025
- Residence: Palacio Quemado, La Paz
- Inaugural holder: Manuela Sáenz
- Formation: 12 August 1825

The First Lady or First Gentleman of Bolivia (Spanish: Primera Dama o Primer Caballero de Bolivia) is the title usually attributed to the wife or husband of the president of Bolivia, or official designee in place of a spouse. She or he fulfills official protocol functions when accompanying the president.

The position of First Lady of Bolivia is currently held by Maria Elena Urquidi, wife of President Rodrigo Paz, since he assumed the presidency on 8 November 2025.

== History ==
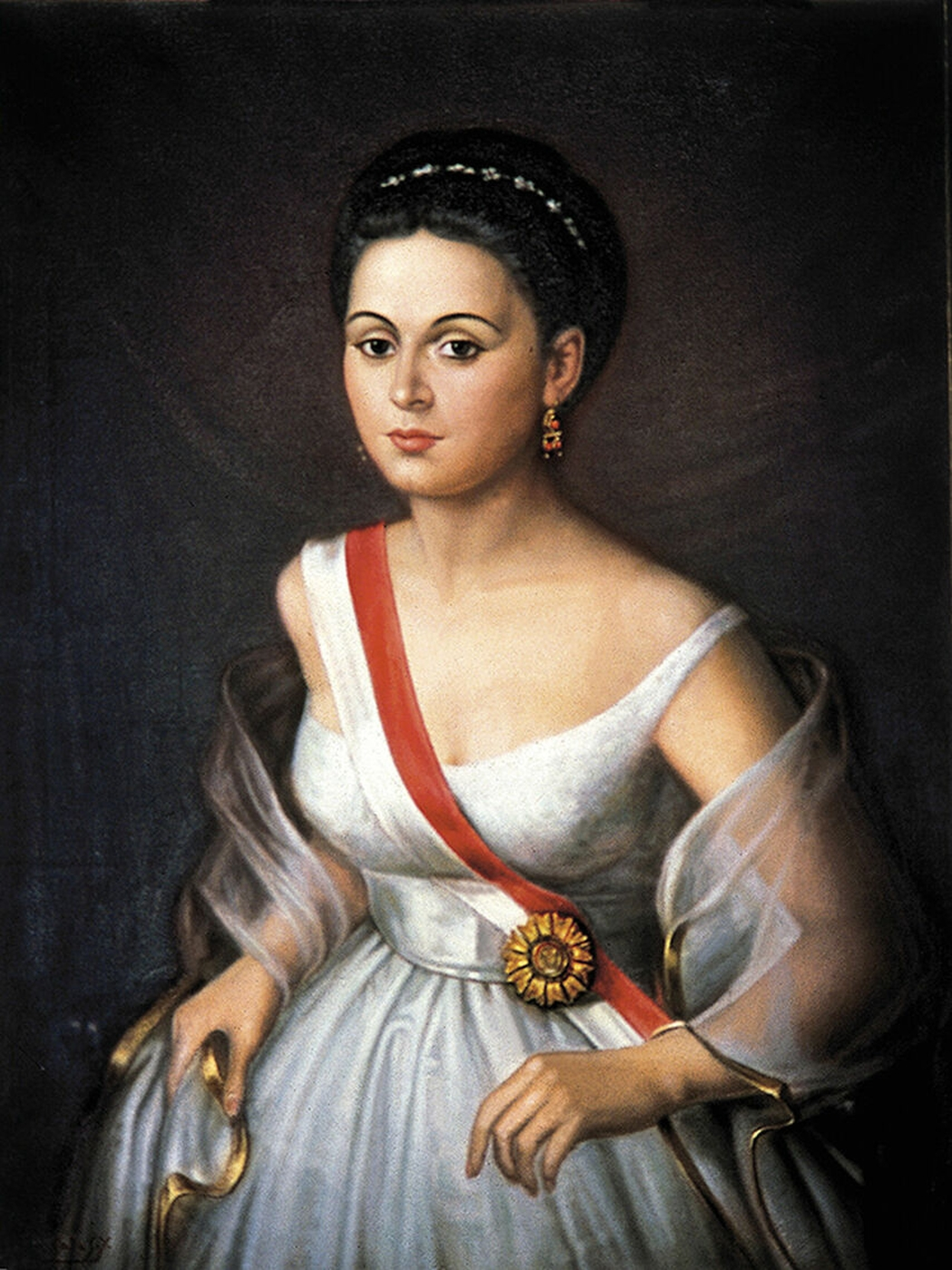
Manuela Sáenz, who became the inaugural First Lady of Bolivia in 1825.

Manuela Sáenz, an Ecuadorian-born and domestic partner of Bolivian independence leader and President Simón Bolívar, is considered the inaugural First Lady of Bolivia. Since Independence of Bolivia in 12 August 1825 to Bolívar having renounced the title on 29 December 1825.

President Lidia Gueiler Tejada, Bolivia's first female head of state, was divorced at the time of her tenure in office (1979–1980), so the position remained vacant. She had previously been married twice, first to Mareirian Pérez-Ramírez, a Paraguayan soldier and wealthy rancher, and then to a Bolivian named Edwin Möller Pacieri, but both marriages ended in divorce.

More recently, former President Evo Morales, who was unmarried, selected his older sister, Esther Morales, as his designee for the role of First Lady during his tenure as president, beginning in 2006. Evo Morales later reversed his own decision and dismissed the official title of first lady as "insulting to women" in 2013, to the disappointment of Esther Morales. Esther Morales continued to participate in public roles, such as official foreign trips, before withdrawing from public life. She died on August 16, 2020, after contracting COVID-19 during the pandemic in Bolivia.

Héctor Hincapié Carvajal, a Colombian politician and second husband of President Jeanine Áñez, became Bolivia's earliest First Gentleman in its history when Áñez assumed the interim presidency on November 12, 2019.
