= Melchor Aymerich =

Spanish general and colonial administrator

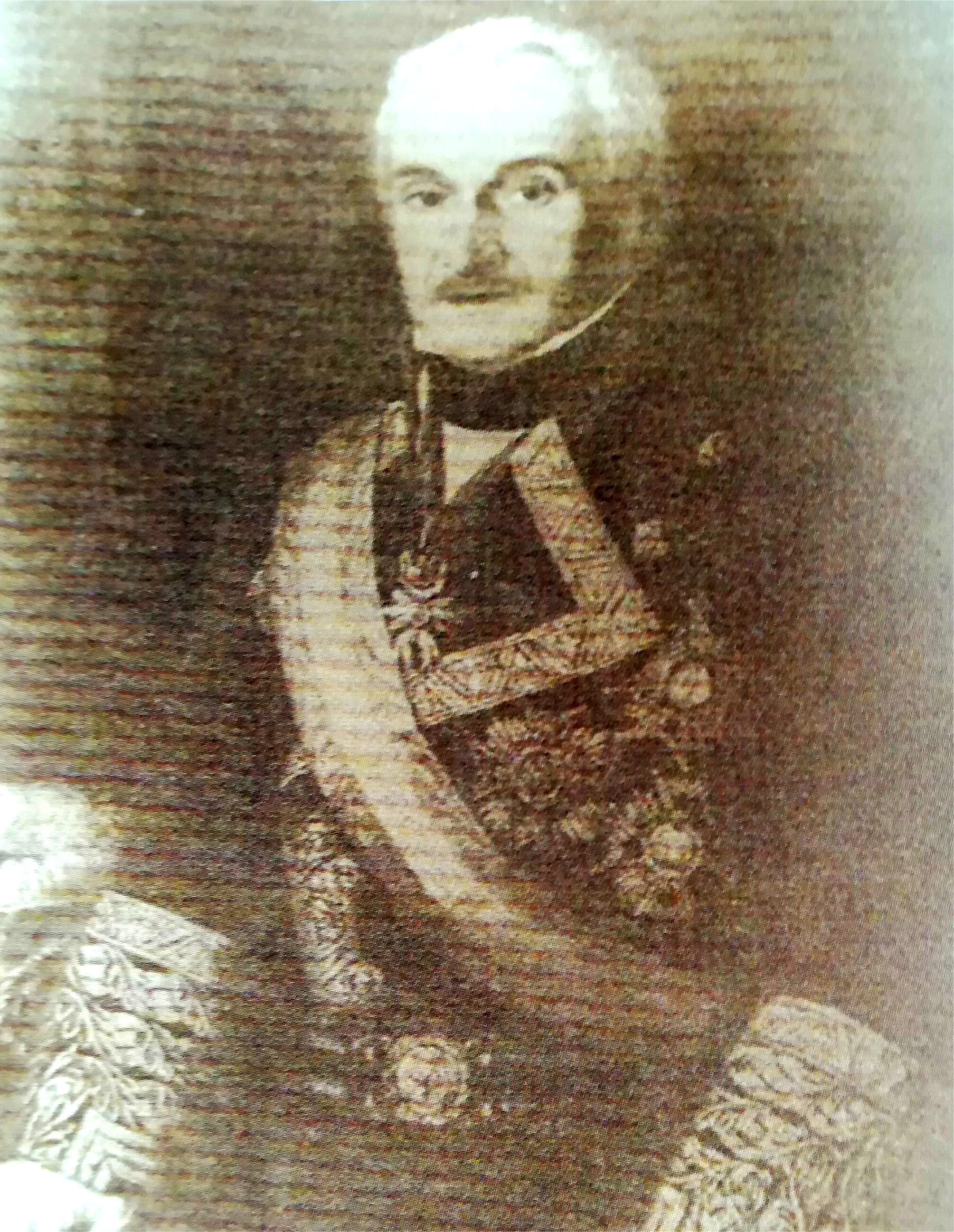
- Born: 5 January 1754; Ceuta, Spain Territory, North Africa
- Died: 11 August 1836 (aged 82); Havana, Cuba
- Spouse: Josefa Espinosa de los Monteros
- Relatives: Brigadier Vicente Aymerich (father)
- Military career
- Allegiance: Spain
- Rank: Lieutenant General
- Commands: Governor of Cuenca Province
- Conflicts: Invasion of Algiers, Second Cevallos expedition, War of the Pyrenees, Quito Revolution, Battle of Pichincha
- Other work: Sub-inspector of the troops of the island of Cuba

Melchor de Aymerich y Villajuana (Ceuta, Spain, 5 January 1754 – Havana, Cuba, 11 August 1836) was a Spanish general and provincial administrator, serving as the last president of the Royal Audience of Quito from April until May 1822.

== Biography ==
He was the son of Brigadier Vicente d'Aymerich and Josefa Villajuana.
On 20 November 1762, he entered the Seville Infantry Regiment as a minor cadet and was promoted to second lieutenant on 17 April 1769. In 1775 he participated in the Invasion of Algiers (1775), and was promoted to lieutenant on 14 February 1776.

=== Uruguay ===
That same year 1775, he took part in the Second Cevallos expedition to the Río de la Plata, distinguishing himself in the reconquest of Colonia del Sacramento on 30 May 1777.

=== Ceuta ===
He was promoted to captain on 9 August 1788, and served in the garrison of Ceuta between 1790 and 1792, assisting in its defense against the Siege of Ceuta (1790–1791) by the Moroccans.

=== France ===
Having received the rank of Lieutenant Colonel on 16 April 1792, he was assigned to the army of Roussillon, fighting the French Republicans in the War of the Pyrenees. In 1793, he saw action in Palua, Argeles, Villelongue and Banyuls-les-Aspres. The following year he participated in the defense of Boulou on 30 April, but was taken prisoner when the Fort de Bellegarde surrendered on 18 September 1794. After regaining his freedom, he received the rank of Colonel on 4 September 1795 and returned to Ceuta, where he served from 1797 to 1800.
He married Josefa Espinosa de los Monteros in Algeciras on 27 September 1802.

=== Ecuador ===
On 1 May 1802, he was appointed Governor of the Cuenca Province in the Real Audiencia de Quito, taking office on 19 November 1803 and where he would remain until 1819. In 1809, he held the interim Presidency of the Real Audiencia de Quito and helped crush the Quito Revolution (1809-1812) in 1811-1812. Promoted to Mariscal de Campo on 20 June 1813, he replaced Juan de Sámano as Commander of the Northern Army the following year, and defeated Nariño's Southern Campaign, taking Republican commander Antonio Nariño prisoner in Pasto, Colombia, on 10 May 1814.

He continued in his government of Cuenca, again temporarily occupying the Presidency of the Real Audiencia de Quito from 1819 to 1821. In that last year he had to face the troops of Patriot General Antonio José de Sucre, whom he first defeated in the Second Battle of Huachi (12 September), but was himself later completely defeated in the Battle of Pichincha on 24 May 1822, immediately capitulating.

== Cuba ==
He was expelled from Ecuador and sent to Cuba, where he was appointed sub-inspector of the troops of the island of Cuba in November 1824, a position he held until his promotion to Lieutenant General on 27 August 1834, when he retired. His offspring stayed in Cuba.
