= Arboleda =

Coordinates: 1.50333°N 77.0878°W

- Municipality and town
- Flag

- Location of the municipality and town of Arboleda in the Nariño Department of Colombia.
- Country: Colombia
- Department: Nariño Department
- Time zone: UTC-5 (Colombia Standard Time)

Arboleda (Spanish pronunciation: [aɾβoˈleða]) is a town and municipality in the Nariño Department, Colombia. Its municipal seat is known as Berruecos. The population in 2020 was estimated to be 8,745 people.
