= Guayana campaign =

1817 military campaign in Venezuela

- Part of Venezuelan War of Independence
- The situation immediately following the campaign
Date	23 November 1816 – 3 August 1817
Location	Spanish Guayana, Captaincy General of Venezuela
Result	Patriot victory, establishment of the Third Republic of Venezuela

Belligerents
Patriots	Spanish Empire

Commanders and leaders
Simón Bolívar; Manuel Piar; Santiago Mariño; Luis Brión	Pablo Morillo; Miguel de la Torre

The Guayana campaign (Spanish: Campaña de Guayana) was the 1816-1817 military campaign conducted by the Patriots during the Venezuelan War of Independence in Spanish Guayana. Forces led by Simón Bolívar and Manuel Piar took control of the region and secured the Orinoco River. The central conflicts of the campaign were the Patriot effort to take Angostura and defeat Miguel de la Torre, who had advanced into the region to repel Piar's invasion. Following the victory, the Third Republic of Venezuela was formed and Piar was tried and executed for insubordination and attempting to undermine Bolívar.

A previous attempt to take the region during the First Republic of Venezuela had ended in a Royalist victory.

== Background ==
After the defeat of the Second Republic of Venezuela, Patriot forces remained active in parts of Venezuela while Simón Bolívar, Manuel Piar, and Santiago Mariño were in exile in the Caribbean. Among the remaining forces, José Antonio Páez held Apure and Pedro Zaresa was active in the llanos. While in Saint Thomas, privateer Jean Baptiste Bideau suggested to Bolívar that the republicans strike to the east to take Guayana. The advantages of the seizure of the region were the wealth, namely cattle, of the Caroní Missions, local animus against the Spanish, the region's lack of damage from the war, and, as José Gregorio Monagas and Manuel Cedeño observed, mineral wealth. Additionally, Bolívar's army of irregulars was better suited for the llanos. Commander-in-chief of Spanish forces Pablo Morillo had stationed few troops in Guayana, anticipating that it would be easy to hold.

Because it was Bolívar's preference to take the coastal region first, placing high value on the target of Caracas, when he and the others returned to Venezuela in 1816, Bolívar first attempted to march from Barcelona to Caracas. However, he was ambushed, causing the death of 200 soldiers. With the number of Royalist soldiers threatening his position in Barcelona growing, he decided to abandon that city. With options in the west exhausted, Bolívar went east to Guayana, just as Piar had already done. He left behind a garrison of 400 soldiers, which was too small to resist the Spanish attack, causing the massacre of its defenders as well as residents, totaling around 1,000 deaths.

== The campaign underway ==
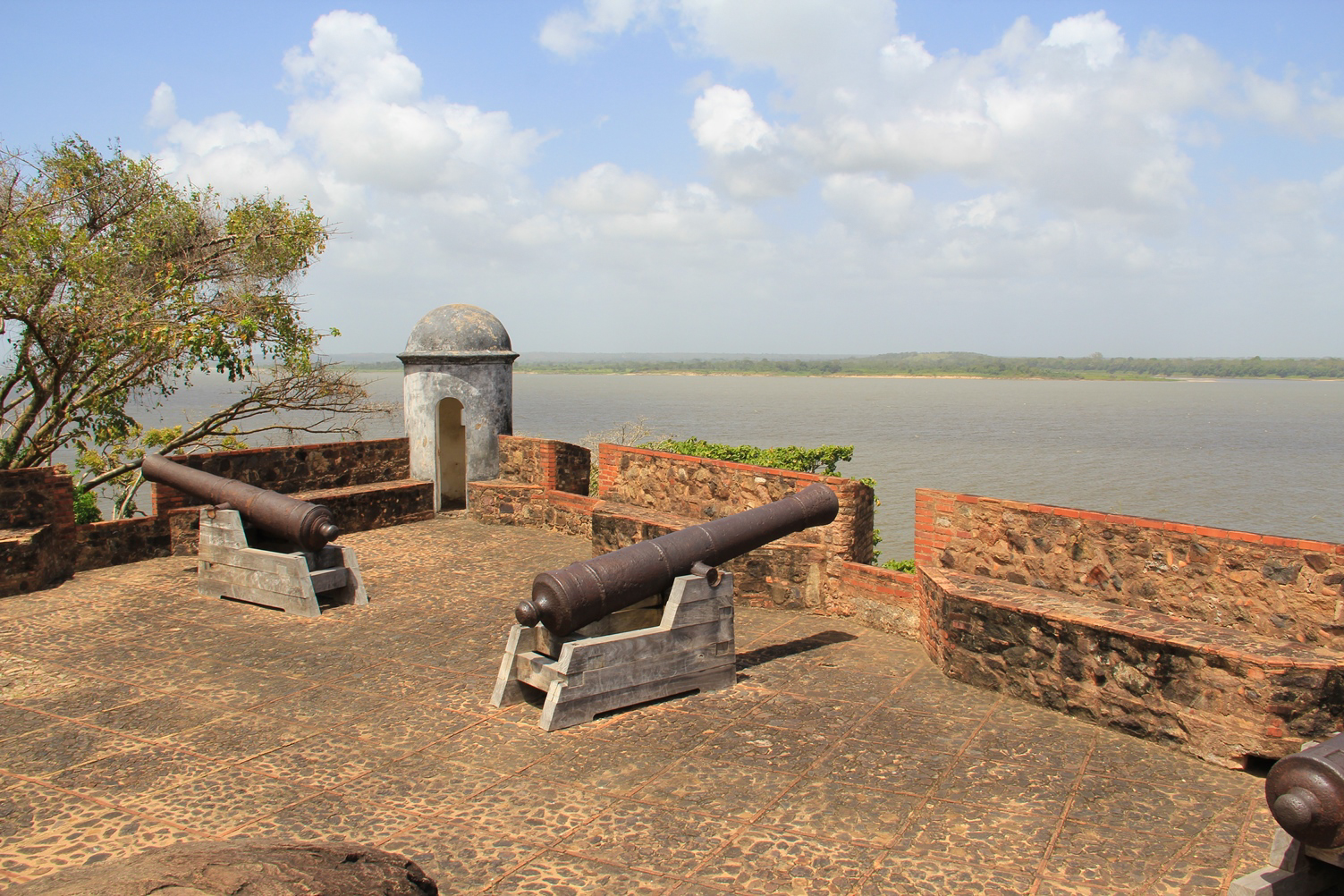
The fortress of Guayana La Vieja

After his victory in the Battle of El Juncal, Piar crossed the Orinoco and entered Guayana on 23 November 1816. He met up with the forces of Manuel Cedeño and defeated Royalists in December at the Caura River. They attempted to take Angostura, but were repulsed, so they laid siege to the city. Piar next seized the Caroní Capuchin missions. José Félix Blanco was appointed administrator of the region. In response to Piar's invasion, Morillo sent Miguel de la Torre, who arrived in Guayana in March. He camped in the area near San Félix where he was subsequently suffered a devastating defeat at the hands of Piar's cavalry on 11 April at the Battle of San Félix. La Torre only narrowly escaped from that battle. 300 of his European soldiers were massacred in the aftermath.

La Torre retreated to Isla Fajardo in the Orinoco, then to Angostura. His defeat allowed for Luis Brión's fleet to enter into the Orinoco as conditions inside Angostura reached starvation conditions. Bolívar anticipated difficulty in taking the fortress at Angostura, Guayana La Vieja. His forces joined the siege there on 26 May. La Torre abandoned the city on 17 July as it fell and went into the fortress. After the Battle of Pagallos, the fortress too was abandoned. In the final battle of the campaign, La Torre's forces evacuating from the Orinoco were harassed on 3 August, but managed to escape to Grenada on 8 August.

=== Political developments ===
As the military campaign continued, in May, republican priest José Cortés de Madariaga convened a small 10 man congress called the Congress of Cariaco in Cariaco with the backing of Santiago Mariño. The congress supported a return to the Constitution of 1811 and federalism. They also created the seven star tricolor flag seen later as the flag of the Third Republic. The congress declared the capital of the republic to be in Margarita, and that Mariño was the supreme chief of the army. Despite his insubordination for supporting the congress, Mariño was not punished.

== Aftermath ==
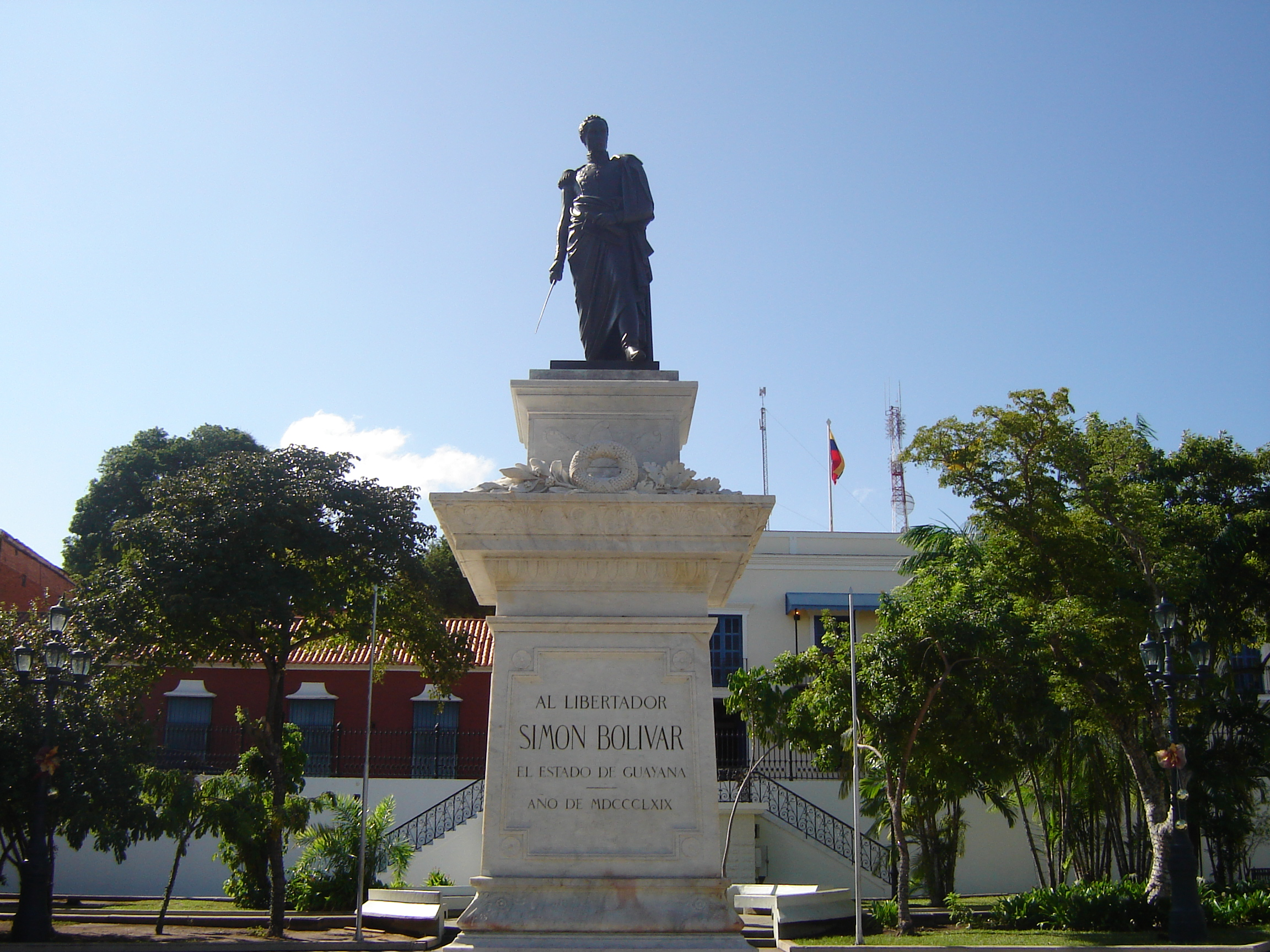
A statue of Bolívar in Ciudad Bolívar, then called Angostura

The east being freed up allowed 4-5,000 men to join in attacking the west. After the campaign, Bolívar was able to declare the Third Republic of Venezuela, which was eventually victorious in securing the independence of Venezuela. On 3 September, Bolívar decreed confiscation of all Spanish property and divided property among the army.

=== Execution of Piar ===
After the campaign's conclusion, Manuel Piar asked Bolívar for sick leave to Trinidad and Curaçao and was first refused, but then granted it. Instead of going there, he left for Upata where he spread rumors that Bolívar was a coward with overly ambitious aspirations. He also spread racial animus to incite the pardos like himself against Bolívar, who was a Mantuano. Informed of what was happening by José Francisco Bermúdez, Bolívar ordered his arrest. Because of Piar's popularity with the military, he could have held out, but instead he fled. Piar's men were reassigned to Rafael Urdaneta and Manuel Cedeño and his cavalry were dispatched to arrest Piar, who was caught at Cumaná trying to rendesvous with Mariño. He was court martialed by a panel including Luis Brión, Camilo Torres Tenorio, and José Antonio Anzoátegui. They sentenced him to death, and he was executed on 15 October 1817.
