= Battle of Angostura =

Battle of Angostura may refer to multiple different battles:

- Battle of Buena Vista, a battle in the Mexican–American War
- Battle of Angostura (1868), a battle in the Paraguayan War
- First Battle of Angostura, a battle in the Venezuelan War of Independence
- Second Battle of Angostura, a battle in the Venezuelan War of Independence
