= Manuel Piar =

Venezuelan general (1774–1817)

Manuel Carlos Piar
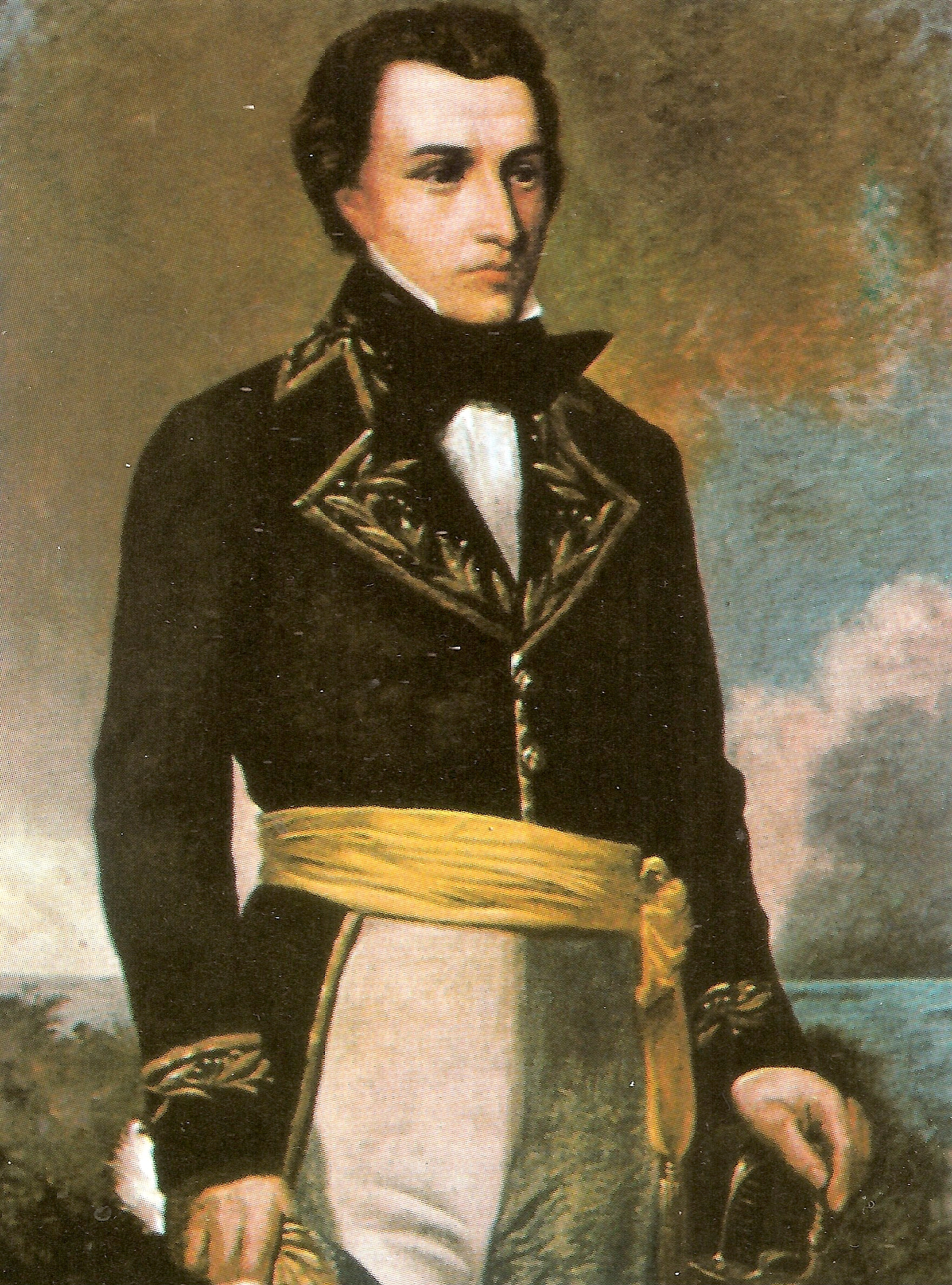
- Born: April 28, 1774; Willemstad, Curaçao
- Died: October 16, 1817 (aged 43); Angostura, Venezuela
- Military career
- Allegiance: Venezuela
- Rank: General-in-Chief
- Conflicts: Conflicts: Venezuelan War of Independence; Campaign of the East; Battle of Alto de Los Godos; Emigration to the East; Battle of El Salado; Guayana Campaign; First Battle of Angostura; Battle of San Félix; Second Battle of Angostura

Manuel Carlos María Francisco Piar Gómez (April 28, 1774 – October 16, 1817) was General-in-Chief of the army fighting Spain during the Venezuelan War of Independence.

== Heritage and early life ==
The son of Fernando Alonso Piar y Lottyn, a Spanish merchant seaman of Canarian origin and María Isabel Gómez, a Dutch woman born to an Afro-Venezuelan father and a Dutch mother in Willemstad, Curaçao, Piar grew up as a humble quadroon subject to the discriminating limits imposed by the social norms of colonial times.

He arrived in Venezuela with his mother when he was ten years old and set up residence in La Guaira. Without formal schooling he acquired by himself a good level of general knowledge and taught himself several languages.

At the age of 23, he decided to join the independence effort and participated in the unsuccessful 1797 Gual and España Conspiracy.

== Military career ==
In 1804, he joined the Curaçao militia that was fighting the British occupation. The Curaçao militia successfully expelled the British, restoring Dutch rule. 1807 found him in Haiti helping the revolution on the island and commanding a warship.

By 1810 his military experience and his desire for independence from the colonial governments put him at the service of the incipient Venezuelan rebellion against Spain. He started in the navy and was deployed to Puerto Cabello. As commander of a warship, he saw action in several engagements against the Spanish navy, including in the Battle of Sorondo in the Orinoco river in 1812.

A deteriorating and losing situation for his side forced Piar to take refuge in Trinidad for some time. Back in Venezuela in 1813 as an army Colonel, he successfully defended Maturín and helped liberate the eastern part of the country from Spanish forces.

The following year, 1814, now a Brigadier General, Piar led troops fighting in the provinces of Barcelona, Caracas, and Cumaná. He lost an engagement with the forces of José Tomás Boves near El Salado.

Promoted to Major General, he joined Simón Bolívar in Haiti in the successful Los Cayos expedition, and the engagements of Los Frailes and Carupano.

In 1816 he defeated the army of Francisco Tomás Morales at El Juncal. From there Piar marched on Guayana, intending to begin the liberation of that province. At the beginning of 1817 he laid siege to the city of Angostura. On April 11 his forces achieved a major victory over those commanded by Spanish General Miguel de la Torre at the Battle of San Félix. A few days after Piar seized the Capuccine missions of Guayana releasing Tumeremo, the Spanish survivors were imprisoned and sentenced to death. From there, the city was a strategic site and barracks for the patriot soldiers commanded by Simón Bolívar. A month later Piar was promoted to the rank of General-in-Chief.

== Downfall, trial and execution ==
At this time, following his military victories, Piar came into conflict with his higher-ranking white criollo superiors, including Simón Bolívar. This friction eventually resulted in Bolívar stripping Piar of direct troop command. Piar then asked for leave, which was granted to him in June 1817.

Besides independence, Piar also wanted greater power-sharing, social rights, and political rights for the mestizos. Unhappy with the way mestizos had been treated by the insular Spaniards under the colonial system, Piar had hoped for better treatment for the mestizos after the defeat of the royalists. However it seemed this would not be the case. Piar, now without any troops to command, decided to remain in Guayana and lobby for support for his views against those of the nearly all-white criollo leadership (Piar being the only exception).

Together with Piar were other very senior military commanders also opposed to Bolívar's leadership. Among these were José Félix Ribas, Santiago Mariño, and José Francisco Bermúdez. However, unlike Piar, they were also white-criollos and their reasons for opposing Bolivar were certainly different from the need to support mestizo rights.

In what is one of the independence struggle's darkest episodes, Bolívar ordered Piar arrested and tried for desertion, insubordination, and conspiring against the government. Since Piar was the only one charged and arrested in this episode, it is generally agreed that Bolívar simply needed to make an example of a single general from among the military leadership. Piar was the unlucky chosen one. He was arrested on September 28, 1817, and was judged by a court martial which found him guilty on all charges; and on October 15 sentenced him to death. On that same day Simón Bolívar, as Supreme Commander, confirmed the sentence. The following day Manuel Piar, General-in-Chief, was executed against the wall of the cathedral of Angostura by a firing squad. In a puzzling moment, Bolívar, who had decided against witnessing the execution, heard the shots from inside his nearby office and said in tears, "He derramado mi sangre" (I have spilled my blood).

== Legacy ==
Piar appears as a Comandante General in Sid Meier's Civilization VI, available only to users playing as the Gran Colombia civilization.

== See also ==
- Military career of Simón Bolívar
