= Battle of Pagallos =

1817 battle in the Venezuelan War of Independence

Coordinates: 8.53°N 61.00°W

- Part of the Venezuelan War of Independence
Date	8 July 1817
Location	The Orinoco, near the island Pagallos
Result	Patriot victory

Belligerents
Third Republic of Venezuela	Spanish Empire

Commanders and leaders
Antonio Díaz; Luis Brión; Fernando Díaz †	Antonio Ambaredes

Units involved
22 ships of varying sizes	11 ships

The Battle of Pagallos (Spanish: Batalla de Pagallos), or, alternatively Pagayos, was a battle on 8 July 1817 during the Venezuelan War of Independence. In the battle, ships under Antonio Díaz carrying materiel to Simón Bolívar's Patriot army were attacked by eleven Royalist ships in the Orinoco, near the island of Pagallos. Patriots took heavy losses but successfully forced Royalists out of the Orinoco.

== Prelude ==
During the Guayana campaign, Simón Bolívar's forces pushed east. For resupply, a force headed by Antonio Díaz and his brother Fernando Díaz set out from Margarita Island. They were joined by privateer Luis Brión on 7 June. Two days before, Brión wrote to Bolívar, saying, "I am ready to join you with my squadron of 4 brigs, 6 schooners, 2 felucas, 1 bandra, 9 flecheras and gunboats. I bring cannon, mortars, grenades, shells, muskets, powders, and uniforms."

On 4 July, a flotilla of four flecheras was sent to aid Rafael Rodríguez, stationed at Angostura. To guarantee the success of the operation, 250 soldiers under Bolívar harassed the Royalist gunboats in the area. They were met with a Royalist force under Juan Cosmos who intended to fire on the Patriot ships. Cosmos killed many, and a few officers managed to escape. The flotilla was captured by the Royalists.

== Battle ==
After passing through the Macareo channel, Fernando Díaz encountered eleven larger ships commanded by Antonio Ambaredes, who belonged to the Spanish station at Guayana La Vieja. Díaz's forces were slaughtered, and only a few survived. The survivors made their way to Antonio Díaz's force and told him about his brother's fate.

The next day, Díaz met the enemy near the island of Pagallos. Díaz was immediately surrounded by Ambaredes' force. Díaz breaks out by targeting three ships which were maneuvering poorly; boarding one ship and beheading several sailors so as to avenge his brother's death. The Royalist force fell back, with the Patriots unable to pursue them, as they sustained major damage. By the fighting's end, Díaz recaptured several flecheras and burned another.

== Aftermath ==
After the battle, Díaz left for either Maturín or Margarita Island for repairs. The battle ensured Patriot control of the Orinoco, which cut off Miguel de la Torre's forces at Angostura, which the Patriots would take in the Second Battle of Angostura.
