= Battle of San Félix =

- Part of Venezuelan War of Independence
Date	11 April 1817
Location	Guayana Province 8.317643°N 62.622102°W
Result	Republican victory

Belligerents
Second Republic of Venezuela	Spanish Empire

Commanders and leaders
Manuel Piar	Miguel de la Torre

Units involved
1,700–2,200	1,300–1,800; 2 pieces of artillery

Casualties and losses
31 killed and 65 wounded	593 killed and 497 prisoners

The Battle of San Félix was an engagement in the Guayana campaign of the War of Independence of Venezuela, that occurred on 11 April 1817, on the mesa of Chirica in Province of Guayana, over the course of just half an hour.

== Background ==
The Republican forces had been campaigning against Guayana from late 1816, though hindered by the lack of a navy. Their goal was to occupy the towns of Angostura and Old Guayana, which would allow them to dominate traffic along the river Orinoco.

Manuel Piar had taken the missions of Caroni in early 1817, which had served as an important supply base for the Royalist Spanish forces; it would thereafter fill the same role for the Revolutionaries.

With the loss of the missions, the places held by the Royalists had largely fallen without a source to supply their armies & were at risk of starvation. Brigadier La Torre left Angostura for the missions in order to reconquer the area and its resources. He had about 1,600 infantry, 200 cavalry and 2 guns with him, and marched to the missions through the fortifications of old Guayana.

== Battle ==
On 11 April the Spaniards met Piar, who led a force of 500 riflemen, 800 lancers, 500 Indian archers and 400 horsemen. The Patriots, which infantry were surpassed in number and experience by the Royalists', won in a short battle thanks to the superiority of the Republican cavalry. Piar fought in this battle "all alone" (that is, with newly formed officers, mostly unknown before and after the battle).

== Consequences ==
The destruction of the Royalist forces in San Felix accelerated the capitulation of Angostura. The town would be abandoned by the Spaniards on the 17th of that month. Thanks to the Battle of San Félix, the Venezuelan Patriots won not only the rich territory of Guayana, but also the critical tool of transportation and commerce, the Orinoco.

César Zumeta, referring to Piar and San Felix, later said:

[Piar] formed an army, triumphed by foresight and courage, and became the first to build an indestructible foundation for the homeland and make possible the organization of the Republic. All that came after San Felix. The campaign was the most momentous in Guiana and one of the most beautiful of our historical cycle.
