= Second Battle of Angostura =

1817 battle in the Venezuelan War of Independence

- Part of the Venezuelan War of Independence
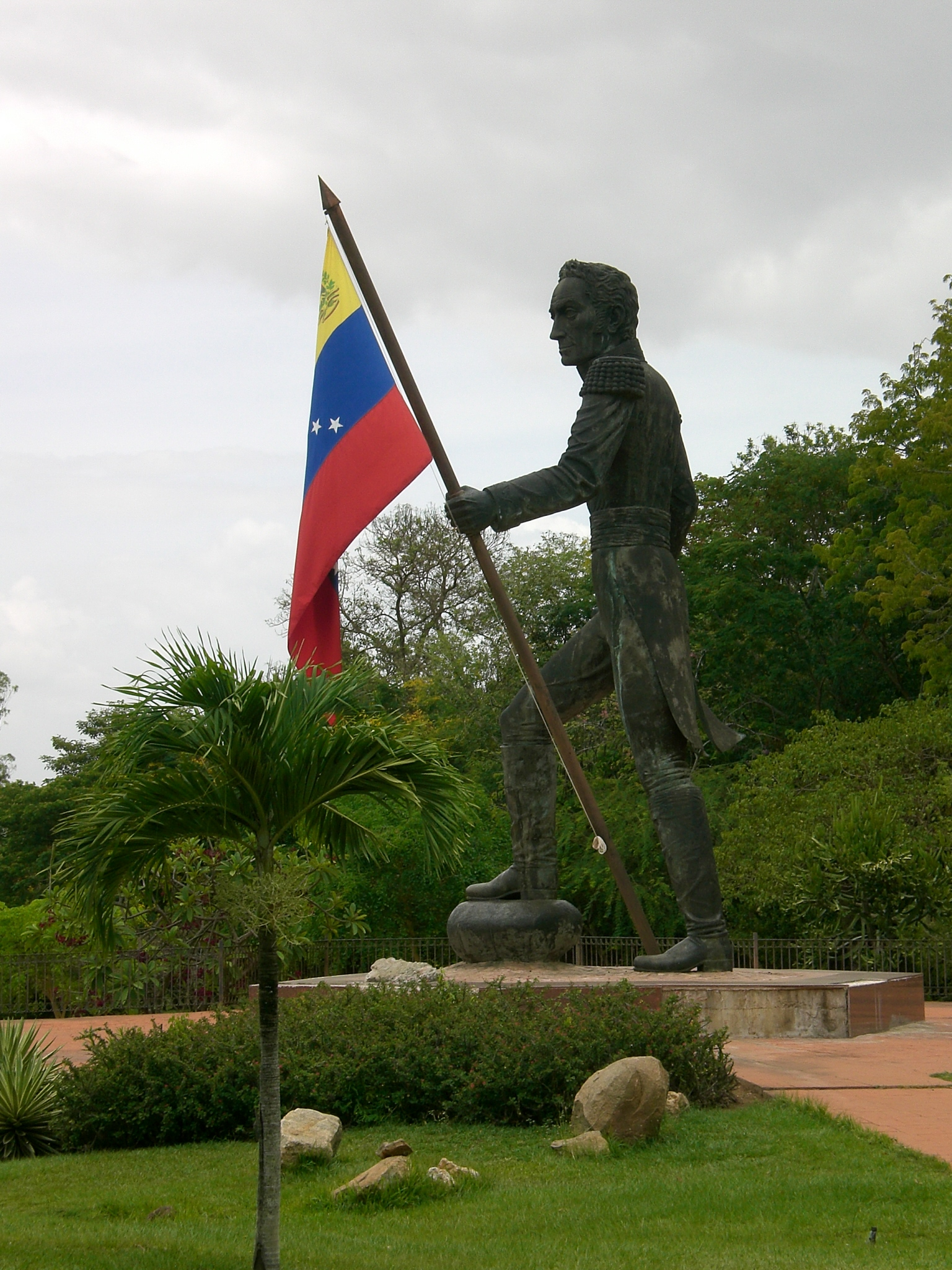
- Monument to Bolívar at Angostura
Date	2 May – 17 July 1817
Location	Angostura, now Ciudad Bolívar 8.137930°N 63.548266°W
Result	Patriot victory

Belligerents
Third Republic of Venezuela	Spanish Empire

Commanders and leaders
Simón Bolívar; José Bermúdez; Manuel Piar; Manuel Cedeño; Luis Brión	Miguel de la Torre; Lorenzo Fitzgerald

Strength
2,000–3,000 soldiers	2,000 soldiers 1,800 civilians

Casualties and losses
Unknown	3,000 soldiers and civilians captured or drowned

The Second Battle of Angostura was a military siege and confrontation that took place in the context of the Venezuelan War of Independence between Patriot and Royalist forces, that ended with victory for the Patriots, who managed to capture the city of Angostura on 17 July 1817.

== Prelude ==
In 1817, most of Venezuela was still under Royalist control, except for several sparsely populated area's which were controlled by Patriot guerilla bands. One of the guerilla leaders was Manuel Piar, who operated in the Guayana Region. In January 1817, he had already attacked Angostura, without success. Manuel Pilar left some troops under control of Manuel Cedeño to further besiege the city.

Soon, the city faced serious supply problems. Hunger eventually led the inhabitants and soldiers to kill every animal they could find and eat plants and herbs. On 8 March, the Spanish sent a relief convoy of 35 ships, protected by the gunboat Carmen, from San Fernando de Apure following the course of the Orinoco. It carried 1,000 to 1,500 soldiers and was commanded by Brigadier Miguel de la Torre, the new military commander of Angostura and Guayana la Vieja. They arrived at Angostura on 27 March, and De la Torre decided to conquer Caroní to reopen the supply line to Angostura, but he was decisively defeated in the Battle of San Félix on 11 April.

At 02:00 on 25 April, Piar ordered several columns to attack Angostura, but after four hours of fighting, De la Torre forced them to withdraw with the loss of 7 officers and 78 soldiers. On the 26th and 27th, the Royalist ships in Guayana la Vieja returned to Angostura to defend the Orinoco line of communication and supply.

On 4 May, Bolívar, who had landed in Guayana on 21 March, arrived at Angostura with his fleet to collaborate in the siege. He relieved Piar of command of the Guyana Army sending him to Upata, and put José Francisco Bermúdez in charge of the forces at Angostura.

=== Evacuation ===
Finally, on 17 July, General La Torre ordered the entire population, 1,800 civilians and 2,000 soldiers and sailors, to embark on the brigs, schooners, and barges anchored in the port, with their belongings, valuables and archives and head to the Orinoco delta. Only 300 soldiers in the garrison were healthy, the rest were in hospital. At 10:00 a.m. the last evacuees left the city for Guayana la Vieja, where its garrison was also evacuated (about 600 troops) on 3 August. The Royalists were in a bad condition due to hunger and disease, and their morale was at rock bottom.

Luis Brión's ships, as ordered by Bolívar, did not stop harassing them. In panic, the fugitive ships began to disperse in the delta. The warships containing La Torre, Fitzgerald, their officers and most healthy soldiers managed to escape. They headed to the Island of Grenada and then to Caracas. Most other ships were captured or lost in the labyrinth of canals and were never heard from again. It is estimated that more than half of the inhabitants and their possessions ended up at the bottom of the river.

While the Royalists evacuated, Bermúdez's troops occupied Angostura and Bolívar entered the city on 19 July and found only some starving left behind people.

== Consequences ==
The Second Siege of Angostura was one of the bloodiest of Venezuela's independence struggle, but one of the greatest victories for Bolívar since the Admirable Campaign. The victory benefited Bolívar, who had risked his life and suffered the same hardships as the troops. However, much of the credit for the victory belonged to Manuel Piar.

In Angostura the Patriots consolidated a base of operations in Guayana and from there they expanded their operations throughout the Orinoco basin. Its possession became essential to link up with José Antonio Páez and attract more llaneros to the Republican cause, and also to conquer Apure and Barinas and advance into the interior of New Granada in 1819.

The Patriots now controlled a province of 30,000 inhabitants, but the main cities of Venezuela and the rest of the country remained in Royalist hands. Bolívar made Angostura the "temporary" capital of his Third Republic of Venezuela, but Caracas would remain under Royalist control until June 1821.

In Angostura, Bolívar also became the undisputed leader of the Venezuelan independence movement, after he had his only remaining rival, General Manuel Piar, executed on 16 October 1817. The Patriot political and military power was definitively unified around the person of the Liberator.

The Guyana Campaign, which ended with this victory, was followed by the Central Campaign (es) (November 1817 - May 1818), which aimed to conquer Central Venezuela, but which ended in total failure for Bolívar and the Patriots.

The liberation of Venezuela would only be completed after the Battle of Carabobo in June 1821.

== Sources ==
- Baralt, Rafael María & Ramón Díaz (1841). Resumen de la historia de Venezuela desde el año de 1797 hasta el de 1830. Tomo I. París: H. Fournier y cía.
- Bushnell, David (2002). Simón Bolívar: hombre de Caracas, proyecto de América. Editorial Biblios. ISBN 9789507863158.
- Esteves González, Edgardo (2004). Batallas de Venezuela, 1810-1824. Caracas: El Nacional. ISBN 9789803880743.
- Lecuna, Vicente (1955). Bolívar y el arte militar. Nueva York: The Colonial Press.
- Lecuna, Vicente (1950). Crónica razonada de las guerras de Bolívar. Tomo II. Nueva York: Colonial Press.
- López Contreras, Eleazar (2005) [1930]. Bolívar, conductor de tropas. Caracas: Presidencia de la República.
- McFarlane, Anthony (2013). War and Independence In Spanish America. Routledge. ISBN 9781136757723.
- Restrepo, José Manuel (1858). Historia de la revolución de la República de Colombia en la América Meridional. Tomo II. Besanzon: Imprenta de José Jacquin.
- Vargas, José María (1958). "Correspondencia privada. Trabajos históricos y pedagógicos. Diarios". En Obras completas. Tomo I. Edición de Blas Bruni Celli. Caracas: Ministerio de Educación.
