= First Battle of Angostura =

1817 battle in the Venezuelan War of Independence

- Part of the Venezuelan War of Independence
Date	18 January 1817
Location	Angostura, now Ciudad Bolívar 8.138°N 63.548°W
Result	Royalist victory

Belligerents
Third Republic of Venezuela	Spanish Empire

Commanders and leaders
Manuel Piar; Manuel Cedeño	Lorenzo Fitzgerald; Guarnición

Strength
~2,000 soldiers	~3,200 soldiers

The First Battle of Angostura took place during the Venezuelan War of Independence. The battle saw Patriot forces attempt to capture the city of Angostura, but retreat after being unable to penetrate Spanish defenses.

== Background ==
A previous attempt in the Venezuelan War of Independence to capture Angostura happened in 1812, when revolutionary González Moreno and 400 soldiers attempted to negotiate with the local authorities. Negotiations broke down and fighting ensued, which failed to yield any gains for the rebels.

Manuel Piar had gathered many Patriot revolutionaries to fight two battles: one to fight Spanish fortifications in the Guyana for the purpose of cutting communication, and the other to capture Angostura.

== Battle ==
Arriving at Angostura on 18 January 1817, Manuel Piar's force, 2,000 strong, were unable to defeat the entrenched Royalist forces, which numbered at about 3,200. He turned the command over to Manuel Cedeño and left along with the rest of the army on 24 January.

== Aftermath ==
After the initial defeat, many officers left Piar to join Simón Bolívar who would take Angostura in the Second Battle of Angostura.
