= José Francisco Bermúdez =

Venezuelan revolutionary and military officer

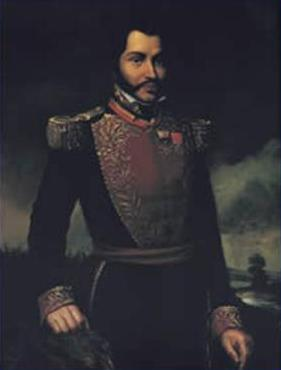
José Francisco Bermúdez

José Francisco Bermúdez (23 January 1782, Cariaco, New Andalusia Province, Captaincy General of Venezuela, Spanish Empire – 15 December 1831, Cumaná, Province of Cumaná, Venezuela) was a Venezuelan revolutionary and military officer. A prominent lieutenant of Simón Bolívar, he fought in the Venezuelan War of Independence and rose to the rank of General. He is buried in the National Pantheon of Venezuela.

A municipality (Bermúdez Municipality) and an airport (General José Francisco Bermúdez Airport), both located in his native Sucre State, are named in his honour.
