= Simón Bolívar =

Venezuelan statesman and military officer (1783–1830)

- Posthumous portrait, 1922

1st President of Colombia (Note: Bolívar was elected provisory president on 16 August 1819, at the Congress of Angostura, but he himself did not accept the position and urged his vice president to assume the government instead. The Republic of Colombia was formally established on 17 December, with Bolívar as its president.)
- In office 17 December 1819 – 27 April 1830
- Succeeded by: Joaquín Mosquera (Note: Domingo Caycedo served as acting president from 4 May until the arrival of Mosquera on 13 June.)

Dictator of Peru (Note: Styled as "Supreme Political and Military Authority of the Peruvian Republic", and holder of the "Dictatorial power". Congress had already granted him "supreme military authority" and "dictatorial political authority" on 10 September 1823, before anulling the office of president. He was proclaimed president for life on 9 December 1826, according to his new constitution, while he was in Colombia. He never actually took office, as he was declared deposed 49 days later in the aftermath of a popular uprising. The constitution was later declared invalid.)
- In office 10 February 1824 – 27 January 1827
- Preceded by: José Bernardo de Tagle
- Succeeded by: José de La Mar

1st President of Bolivia (Note: He was assigned the "Supreme Executive Power" of the Republic of Bolívar on 11 August 1825 by decree of the General Assembly. The same decree also states that Bolívar "shall have the honors of Protector and President" wherever he "exists outside [the country's] limits". In addition, the term "president" was not in common use at the time of his designation. Whether this then makes Bolívar not the first president is a minor source of academic dispute.)
- In office 6 August – 29 December 1825
- Succeeded by: Antonio José de Sucre

Supreme Chief of Venezuela (Note: De facto head of state of the Second Republic of Venezuela after capturing Caracas on 6 August 1813; proclaimed "Supreme Chief" and "Liberator of Venezuela" on 14 October. Bolívar was forced to flee the capital on 7 July, although the last Republican holdout was not defeated until 11 December. Bolivar was proclaimed "Supreme Chief" again on 7 May 1816, after arriving at the northern city of Juan Griego. A Third Republic was established after capturing Angostura on 17 July 1817.)
- In office 6 August 1813 – 7 July 1814
- Preceded by: Francisco de Miranda (1812)
- In office 19 July 1817 – 17 December 1819
- Succeeded by: Himself as president of Colombia

Personal details
- Born: 24 July 1783 Caracas, Captaincy General of Venezuela
- Died: 17 December 1830 (aged 47) Santa Marta, Gran Colombia
- Resting place: National Pantheon of Venezuela
- Citizenship: Spanish (1783–1810); Venezuelan (1811–1819); New Granadan (1813–1819); Colombian (1819–1830)
- Spouse: María Teresa Rodríguez del Toro y Alaysa (m. 1802; died 1803)
- Domestic partners: Manuela Sáenz
- Military career
- Conflicts: Spanish American wars of independence; Venezuelan War of Independence; Monteverde Reconquest Campaign; First Siege of Puerto Cabello; Admirable Campaign; Battle of Cúcuta; Battle of Taguanes; Campaign of the Valleys of Aragua and Tuy; Battle of San Mateo (1814); Battle of Araure; First Battle of Carabobo; Second Battle of the Puerta; 1814 Caracas Exodus; Battle of Aragua de Barcelona; Expedition of Los Cayos; Taking of Carúpano; Guayana campaign; Battle of Clarines; Siege of Barcelona; Second Battle of Angostura; Campaign of the Center; Battle of Calabozo; Third Battle of La Puerta; Battle of Ortiz; Second Battle of Carabobo; Colombian War of Independence; Magdalena campaign; Bolívar's campaign to liberate New Granada; Combat of Corrales; Battle of Gámeza and Tópag; Battle of the Vargas Reservoir; Battle of Boyacá; Pasto Campaign; Battle of Bomboná (1822); Battle of Ibarra; Ecuadorian War of Independence; Peruvian War of Independence; Battle of Junin; Gran Colombia–Peru War

Simón José Antonio de la Santísima Trinidad Bolívar Palacios Ponte y Blanco (Note: English: /ˈbɒlɪvər, -vɑːr/ BOL-iv-ər, -ar; US: /ˈboʊlɪvɑːr/ BOH-liv-ar; Spanish: [siˈmom boˈliβaɾ]) (24 July 1783 – 17 December 1830) was a Venezuelan military officer and statesman who led what are currently the countries of Bolivia, Colombia, Ecuador, Panama, Peru, and Venezuela to independence from the Spanish Empire. He is known colloquially as El Libertador, "the Liberator", of America.

Bolívar was born in Caracas in the Captaincy General of Venezuela into a wealthy family of South American-born Spaniards (criollo) but lost both parents as a child. He was educated abroad and lived in Spain, as was common for men of upper-class families in his day. While living in Madrid from 1800 to 1802, he was introduced to Enlightenment philosophy and married María Teresa Rodríguez del Toro y Alaysa, who died in Venezuela from yellow fever in 1803. From 1803 to 1805, Bolívar embarked on a Grand Tour that ended in Rome, where he swore to end Spanish rule in the Americas. In 1807, Bolívar returned to Venezuela and promoted Venezuelan independence to other wealthy creoles. When Napoleon's Peninsular War weakened Spanish authority, Bolívar became a zealous combatant and politician in the Spanish American wars of independence.

Bolívar began his military career in 1810 as a militia officer in the Venezuelan War of Independence, fighting Royalist forces for the first and second Venezuelan republics and the United Provinces of New Granada. After Spanish forces subdued New Granada in 1815, Bolívar was forced into exile on Jamaica. In Haiti, Bolívar met and befriended Haitian revolutionary leader Alexandre Pétion. After promising to abolish slavery in Spanish America, Bolívar received military support from Pétion and returned to Venezuela. He established a third republic in 1817, and crossed the Andes to liberate New Granada in 1819. Bolívar and his allies defeated the Spanish in New Granada in 1819, Venezuela and Panama in 1821, Ecuador in 1822, Peru in 1824, and Bolivia in 1825. Venezuela, New Granada, Ecuador, and Panama were merged into the Republic of Colombia (Gran Colombia), with Bolívar as president there and in Peru and Bolivia.

In his final years, Bolívar became increasingly disillusioned with the South American republics. He was successively removed from his offices until he resigned the presidency of Colombia and died of tuberculosis in 1830. His legacy is diverse and far-reaching within Latin America and beyond. He is regarded as a hero and national and cultural icon throughout Latin America. The nations of Bolivia and Venezuela (as the Bolivarian Republic of Venezuela) are named after him, and he has been memorialized all over the world in the form of public art or street names and in popular culture.

== Early life and family ==
Simón Bolívar was born on 24 July 1783 in Caracas, capital of the Captaincy General of Venezuela, the fourth and youngest child of Juan Vicente Bolívar y Ponte and María de la Concepción Palacios y Blanco. He was baptized as Simón José Antonio de la Santísima Trinidad Bolívar y Palacios on 30 July. The first of Bolívar's family to have emigrated to the Americas was a similarly named minor Spanish governmental official named Simón de Bolívar, who had been a notary in Spain's Basque Country before arriving in Venezuela in the 1580s . The earlier Simón de Bolívar's descendants had served in the colonial bureaucracy and had married into various wealthy Caracas families over the years. By the time Simón Bolívar was born, the Bolívar family was one of the wealthiest and most prestigious criollo (creole) families in the Spanish Americas.

Simón Bolívar's childhood was described by British historian John Lynch as "at once privileged and deprived". Juan Vicente died of tuberculosis on 19 January 1786, leaving María de la Concepción Palacios and her father, Feliciano Palacios y Sojo, as legal guardians over the Bolívar children's inheritances. Those children – María Antonia (born 1777), Juana (born 1779), Juan Vicente (born 1781), and Simón – were raised separately from each other and their mother, and, following colonial custom, by African house slaves; Simón was raised by a slave named Hipólita whom he viewed as both a motherly and fatherly figure. On 6 July 1792, María de la Concepción also died of tuberculosis. Believing that his family would inherit the Bolívars' wealth, Feliciano Palacios arranged marriages for María Antonia and Juana and, before dying on 5 December 1793, assigned custody of Juan Vicente and Simón to his sons, Juan Félix Palacios and Carlos Palacios y Blanco, respectively. Bolívar came to loathe Carlos Palacios, who had no interest in the boy other than his inheritance.

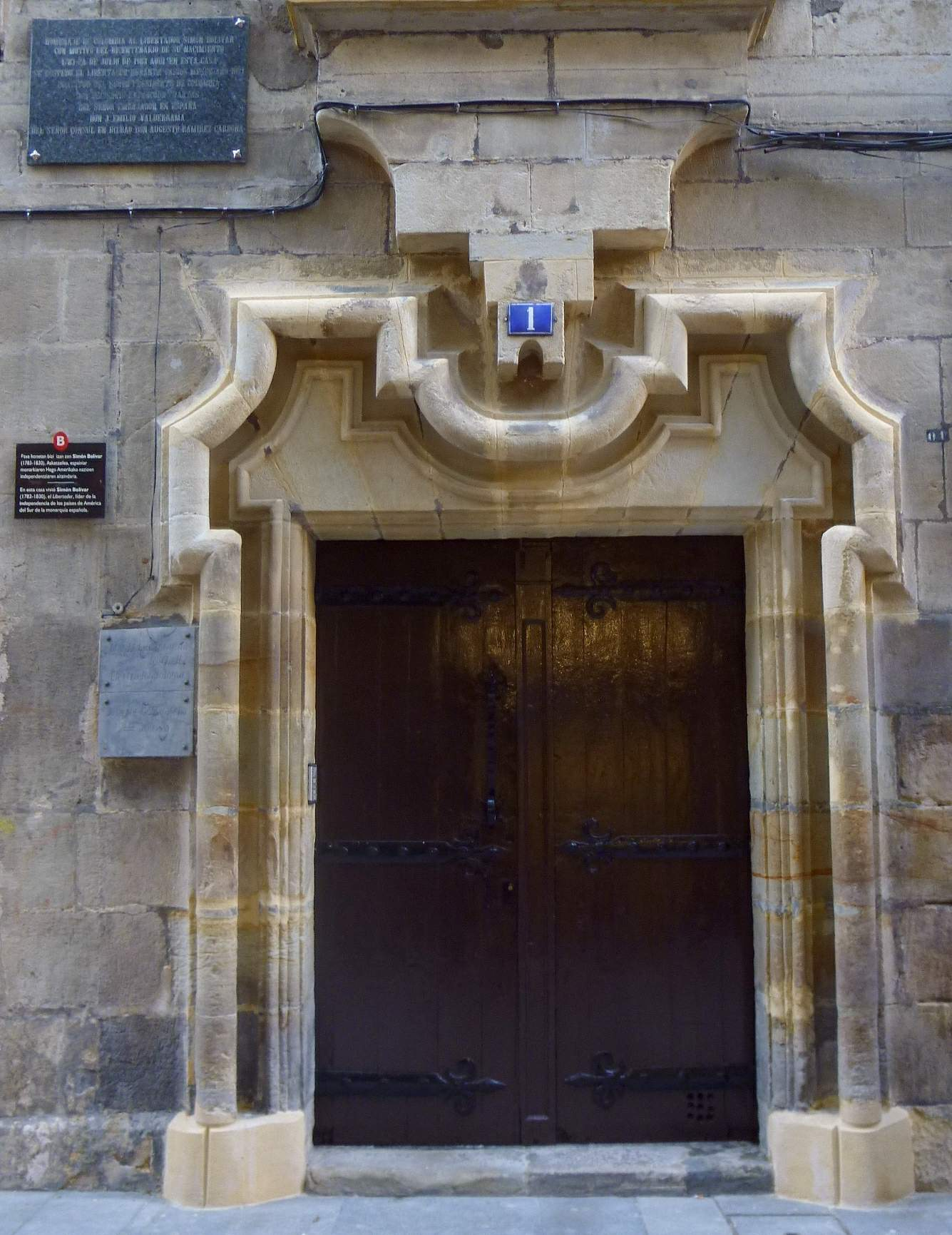
House that hosted Simón Bolívar during his stay in Bilbao between March 1801 and April 1802.

=== Education and first journey to Europe: 1793–1802 ===
As a child, Bolívar was notoriously unruly and neglected his studies. Before his mother died, he spent two years under the tutelage of the Venezuelan lawyer Miguel José Sanz at the direction of the Real Audiencia of Caracas, the Spanish court of appeals in Caracas. In 1793, Carlos enrolled Bolívar at a rudimentary primary school run by Venezuelan educator Simón Rodríguez. In June 1795, Bolívar fled his uncle's custody for the house of his sister María Antonia and her husband. The couple sought formal recognition of his change of residence, but the Real Audiencia decided the matter in favor of Palacios, who sent Bolívar to live with Rodríguez.

After two months there, the Real Audiencia directed that Bolívar be returned to the Palacios family home. Bolívar promised the Real Audiencia that he would focus on his education and was subsequently taught full-time by Rodríguez and the Venezuelan intellectuals Andrés Bello and Francisco de Andújar. In 1797, Rodríguez's connection to the pro-independence Gual and España conspiracy forced him to go into exile, and Bolívar was enrolled in an honorary militia force, which served a largely decorative role. When he was commissioned as an officer after a year, his uncles Carlos and Esteban Palacios y Blanco decided to send Bolívar to join the latter in Madrid.

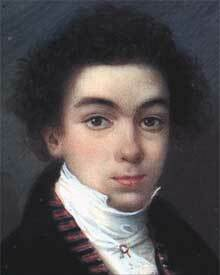
Miniature portrait of Bolívar in 1800

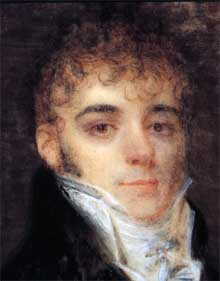
Bolívar at the age of 20 (1804)

On 19 January 1799, Bolívar boarded the Spanish warship San Ildefonso at the port of La Guaira, bound for Cádiz. He arrived in Santoña, on the northern coast of Spain, in May 1799. A little over a week later, he arrived in Madrid and joined Esteban, who found Bolívar to be "very ignorant". Esteban asked Gerónimo Enrique de Uztáriz y Tovar, a Caracas native and government official, to educate Bolívar. Bolívar moved into Uztáriz's residence in February 1800 and was educated in the Classics, literature, and social studies. Esteban was friends with Queen Maria Luisa's favorite, Manuel Mallo.

At the same time, Mallo fell out of the Queen's favor and Manuel Godoy, her previous favorite, returned to power. As members of Mallo's faction at court, Esteban was arrested on pretense, and Bolívar was banished from court following a public incident at the Puerta de Toledo over the wearing of diamonds without royal permission. Bolívar also at this time met María Teresa Rodríguez del Toro y Alaysa, the daughter of another wealthy Caracas creole. They were engaged in August 1800, but were separated when the del Toros left Madrid for their summer home in Bilbao. After Uztáriz left Madrid for a government assignment in Teruel in 1801, Bolívar himself left for Bilbao and remained there when the del Toros returned to the capital in August 1801. Early in 1802, Bolívar traveled to Paris while he awaited permission to return to Madrid, which was granted in April.

=== Return to Venezuela and second journey to Europe: 1802–1805 ===
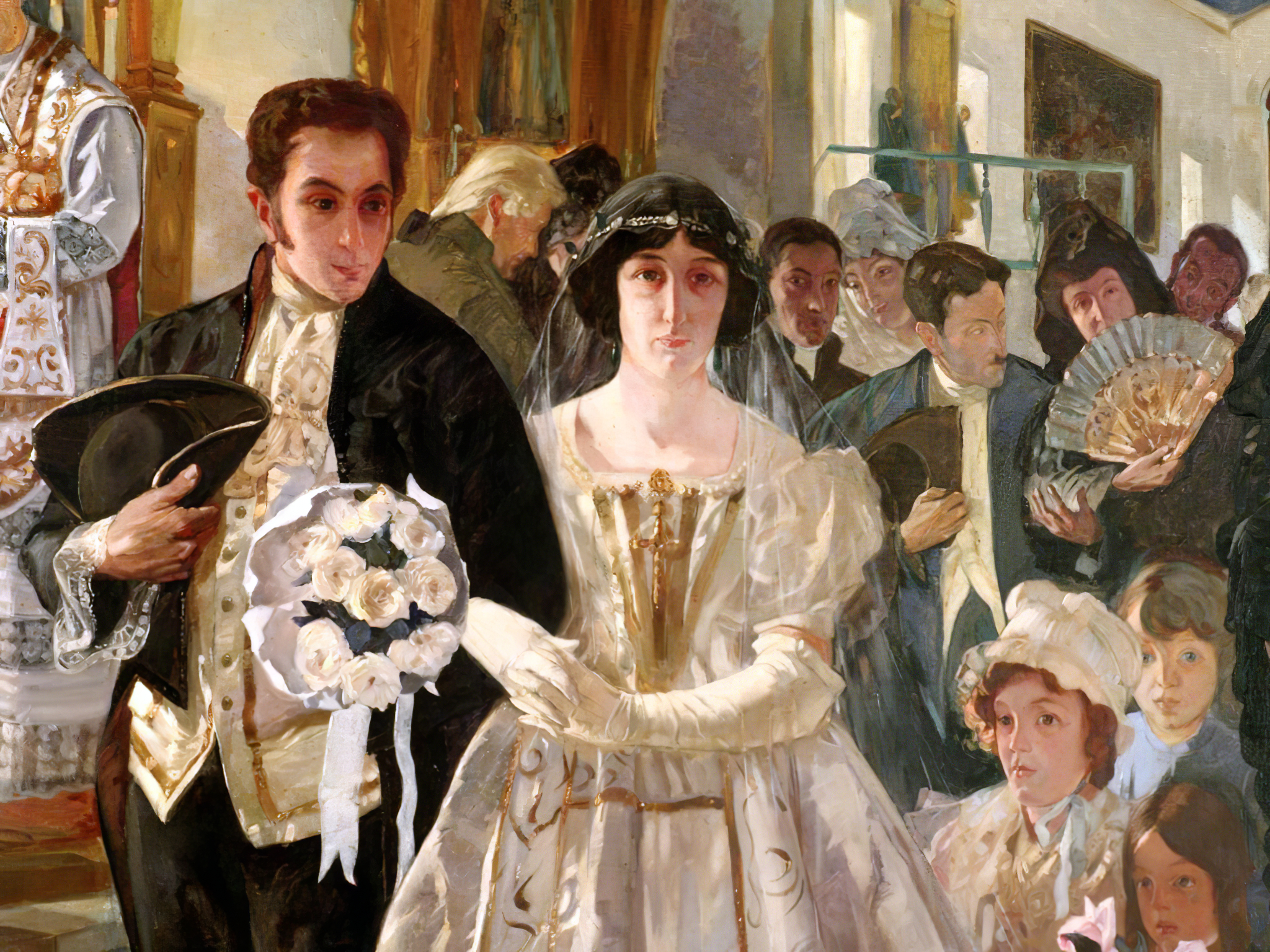
Wedding of Bolívar and del Toro as painted by Tito Salas, 1921

Bolívar and del Toro, aged 18 and 21 respectively, were married in Madrid on 26 May 1802. The couple boarded the San Ildefonso in La Coruña on 15 June and sailed for La Guaira, where they arrived on 12 July. They settled in Caracas, where del Toro fell ill and died of yellow fever on 22 January 1803. Bolívar was devastated by del Toro's death and later told Louis Peru de Lacroix, one of his generals and biographers, that he swore to never remarry. By July 1803, Bolívar had decided to leave Venezuela for Europe. He entrusted his estates to an agent and his brother and, in October, boarded a ship bound for Spain.

Bolívar arrived in Spain in December 1803, then traveled to Madrid to console his father-in-law. In March 1804, Madrid ordered all non-residents in the city to leave to alleviate a bread shortage brought about by Spain's resumed hostilities with Britain. Over April, Bolívar and Fernando Rodríguez del Toro, a childhood friend and relative of his wife, made their way to Paris and arrived in time for Napoleon to be proclaimed Emperor of the French on 18 May 1804. They rented an apartment on the Rue Vivienne and met with other South Americans such as Carlos de Montúfar, Vicente Rocafuerte, and Simón Rodríguez, who joined Bolívar and del Toro in their apartment. While in Paris, Bolívar began a dalliance with the Countess Dervieu du Villars, at whose salon he likely met the naturalists Alexander von Humboldt and Aimé Bonpland, who had traveled through much of Spanish America from 1799 to 1804. Bolívar supposedly discussed Spanish American independence with them.

I swear before you ... that I will not rest body or soul until I have broken the chains binding us to the will of Spanish might!

— Simón Bolívar, 15 August 1805

In April 1805, Bolívar left Paris with Rodríguez and del Toro on a Grand Tour to Italy. Beginning in Lyon, they traveled through the Savoy Alps and then to Milan. The trio arrived on 26 May 1805 and witnessed Napoleon's coronation as King of Italy. From Milan, they traveled down the Po Valley to Venice, then to Florence, and then finally Rome, where Bolívar met, among others, Pope Pius VII, French writer Germaine de Staël, and Humboldt again. Rome's sites and history excited Bolívar. On 18 August 1805, when he, del Toro, and Rodríguez traveled to the Mons Sacer, where the plebs had seceded from Rome in the 4th century BC, Bolívar swore to end Spanish rule in the Americas.

== Political and military career ==
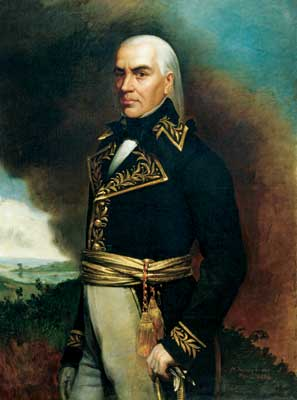
Portrait of Francisco de Miranda by Martín Tovar y Tovar

By April 1806, Bolívar had returned to Paris and desired passage to Venezuela, where Venezuelan revolutionary Francisco de Miranda had just attempted an invasion with American volunteers. Britain's command of the sea after the 1805 Battle of Trafalgar obliged Bolívar to board an American ship in Hamburg in October 1806. Bolívar arrived in Charleston, South Carolina, in January 1807, and from there traveled to Washington, D.C., Philadelphia, New York City, and Boston. Bolívar then returned to Philadelphia and sailed for Venezuela, where he arrived in June 1807. He began to meet with other creole elites to discuss independence from Spain. Finding himself to be far more radical than the rest of Caracas high society, however, Bolívar occupied himself with a property dispute with a neighbor, Antonio Nicolás Briceño.

In 1807–08, Napoleon invaded the Iberian peninsula and replaced the rulers of Spain with his brother, Joseph. This news arrived in Venezuela in July 1808. Napoleonic rule was rejected and Venezuelan creoles, though still loyal to Ferdinand VII of Spain, sought to form their own local government in place of the existing Spanish government. On 24 November 1808, a group of creoles presented a petition demanding an independent government to Juan de Casas, the Captain-General of Venezuela, and were arrested. Bolívar, though he did not sign the petition and thus was not arrested, was warned to cease hosting or attending seditious meetings. In May 1809, Casas was replaced by Vicente Emparán and his staff, which included Fernando Rodríguez del Toro. The creoles also resisted Emparán's government, despite his friendlier disposition towards them.

By February 1810, French victories in Spain prompted the dissolution of the anti-French Spanish government in favor of a five-man regency council for Ferdinand VII. This news, and two delegates that included Carlos de Montúfar, arrived in Venezuela on 17 April 1810. Two days later, the creoles succeeded in deposing and then expelling Emparán, and created the Supreme Junta of Caracas, independent from the Spanish regency but not Ferdinand VII. Absent from Caracas for the coup, Bolívar and his brother returned to the city and offered their services to the Supreme Junta as diplomats. In May 1810, Juan Vicente was sent to the United States to buy weapons, while Simón secured a place in a diplomatic mission to Britain with the lawyer Luis López Méndez and Andrés Bello by paying for the mission. The trio boarded a British ship in June 1810 and arrived at Portsmouth on 10 July 1810.

The three delegates first met Miranda at his London residence, despite instructions from the Supreme Junta to avoid him, and thereafter received the benefit of his connections and consultation. On 16 July 1810, the Venezuelan delegation met Britain's foreign secretary, Richard Wellesley, at Apsley House. Led by Bolívar, the Venezuelans argued in favor of Venezuelan independence, which Wellesley stated was intolerable for Anglo-Spanish relations. Subsequent meetings produced no recognition or concrete support from Britain. Finding that he had many shared beliefs with Miranda, however, Bolívar convinced him to come back to Venezuela. On 22 September 1810, Bolívar left for Venezuela while López and Bello remained in London as diplomats, and arrived in La Guaira on 5 December. Although the British government wanted Miranda to remain in Britain, they could not prevent his departure, and he arrived in Venezuela later in December. (Note: Biographers disagree on the exact date Miranda arrived in Venezuela in December 1810. Arana says 10 December, Lynch says 11 December, Masur and Langley say 12 December, Slatta and de Grummond say 13 December.)

=== Venezuela: 1811–1812 ===
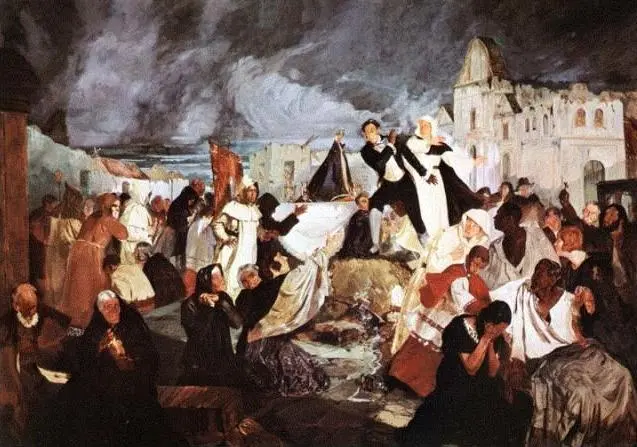
Oil on canvas "Terremoto de 1812", by Venezuelan painter Tito Salas

While Bolívar was in England, the Supreme Junta passed liberal economic reforms and began to hold elections for representatives to a congress to be held in Caracas. It had also alienated Caracas from the Venezuelan provinces of Coro, Maracaibo, and Guayana, which professed loyalty to the regency council, and began hostilities with them. Co-founding the Patriotic Society, a political organization advocating for independence from Spain, Bolívar and Miranda campaigned for and secured the latter's election to the congress. The congress first met on 2 March 1811 and declared its allegiance to Ferdinand VII. After it was discovered that one of the men leading the congress was a Spanish agent who had escaped with military documents, however, discourse – which Bolívar was prominent in – changed decidedly in favor of independence over 3 and 4 July. Finally, on 5 July, the congress declared Venezuela's independence.

The declaration of independence created the first Republic of Venezuela. It had a weak base of support and enemies in conservative whites, disenfranchised people of color, and the already hostile Venezuelan provinces, which received troops and supplies from the Captaincy-Generals of Puerto Rico and Cuba. On 13 July 1811, the republic raised militias to fight the pro-Spanish Royalists. The congress appointed Francisco Rodríguez del Toro, the Marquis of Toro, to command these forces, which opened a breach between Bolívar and Miranda. Bolívar and del Toro were close friends, while del Toro and Miranda and their families were enemies. After he failed to suppress a Royalist uprising in the city of Valencia later in July, the congress replaced del Toro with Miranda, and he recaptured Valencia on 13 August. As a condition of assuming command of the Republican forces, Miranda had Bolívar stripped of his command of a militia unit. Bolívar nonetheless fought in the Valencia campaign as part of del Toro's militia and was selected by Miranda to bring news of its recapture to Caracas, where he argued for more punitive and forceful campaigning against the Royalists.

I left my house for the Cathedral ... and the earth began to shake with a huge roar. ... I saw the church of San Jacinto collapse on its own foundations. ... I climbed over the ruins and entered, and I immediately saw about forty persons dead or dying under the rubble. I climbed out again and I shall never forget that moment. On the top of the ruins I found Don Simón Bolívar ... He saw me and [said], "We will fight nature itself if it opposes us, and force it to obey."

— Royalist historian José Domingo Díaz, quoted by John Lynch

Beginning in November 1811, Royalist forces began pushing back the Republicans from the north and east. On 26 March 1812, a powerful earthquake devastated Republican Venezuela; Caracas itself was almost totally destroyed. Bolívar, who was still near Caracas, rushed into the city to participate in the rescue of survivors and exhumation of the dead. The earthquake destroyed public support for the republic, as it was believed to have been divine retribution for declaring independence from Spain. By April, a Royalist army under the Spanish naval officer Juan Domingo de Monteverde overran western Venezuela. Miranda, retreating east with a disintegrating army, ordered Bolívar to assume command of the coastal city of Puerto Cabello and its fortress, which contained Royalist prisoners and most of the republic's remaining arms and ammunition.

Bolívar arrived at Puerto Cabello on 4 May 1812. On 30 June, an officer of the fort's garrison loyal to the Royalists released its prisoners, armed them, and turned its cannons on Puerto Cabello. Weakened by shelling, defections, and lack of supplies, Bolívar and his remaining troops fled for La Guaira on 6 July. Believing the republic to be doomed, Miranda decided to capitulate, shocking Bolívar and other Republican officers. After formally surrendering his command to Monteverde on 25 July, Miranda made his way to La Guaira, where a group of officers including Bolívar arrested Miranda on 30 July on charges of treason against the republic. La Guaira declared for the Royalists the next day and closed its port on Monteverde's orders. Miranda was taken into Spanish custody and moved to a prison in Cádiz, where he died on 16 July 1816.

=== New Granada and Venezuela: 1812–1815 ===
Bolívar escaped La Guaira early on 31 July 1812 and rode to Caracas, where he hid from arrest in the home of Esteban Fernández de León, the Marquis de Casa León. Bolívar and Casa León convinced Francisco Iturbe, a friend of the Bolívar family and of Monteverde, to intercede on Bolívar's behalf and secure escape from Venezuela for him. Iturbe persuaded Monteverde to issue Bolívar a passport for his role in Miranda's arrest, and on 27 August he sailed for the island of Curaçao. He and his uncles Francisco and José Félix Ribas arrived on 1 September. Late in October, the exiles arranged for passage west to the city of Cartagena to offer their services as military leaders to the United Provinces of New Granada against the Royalists. They arrived in November and were welcomed by Manuel Rodríguez Torices, president of the Free State of Cartagena, who instructed his commanding general, Pierre Labatut, to give Bolívar a military command. Labatut, a former partisan of Miranda, begrudgingly obliged and on 1 December 1812 placed Bolívar in command of the 70-man garrison of a town on the lower Magdalena River.

While en route to his posting, Bolívar issued the Cartagena Manifesto, South American republics and distanced himself from them because. In particular, Bolívar called for the disparate New Granadan republics to help him invade Venezuela to prevent a Royalist invasion of New Granada. Bolívar arrived on the Magdalena River on 21 December and, in spite of orders from Labatut to not act without his direction, launched an offensive that secured control of the Magdalena River from Royalist forces by 8 January 1813. In February, he joined forces with Republican colonel Manuel del Castillo y Rada, who requested Bolívar's assistance with stopping a Royalist advance into New Granada from Venezuela, and captured the city of Cúcuta from the Royalists.

In early March 1813, Bolívar set up his headquarters in Cúcuta and sent José Félix Ribas to request permission to invade Venezuela. Though rewarded with honorary citizenship in New Granada and a promotion to the rank of brigadier general, that permission did not come until 7 May because of del Castillo's opposition to the invasion. When a limited invasion was permitted, Castillo resigned his command and was succeeded by Francisco de Paula Santander. On 14 May, Bolívar launched the Admirable Campaign, in which he issued the Decree of War to the Death, ordering the death of all Spaniards in South America not actively aiding his forces. Within six months, Bolívar pushed all the way to Caracas, which he entered on 6 August, and then drove Monteverde out of Venezuela in October. Bolívar returned to Caracas on 14 October and was named "The Liberator" (El Libertador) by its town council, a title first given to him by the citizens of the Venezuelan town of Mérida on 23 May.

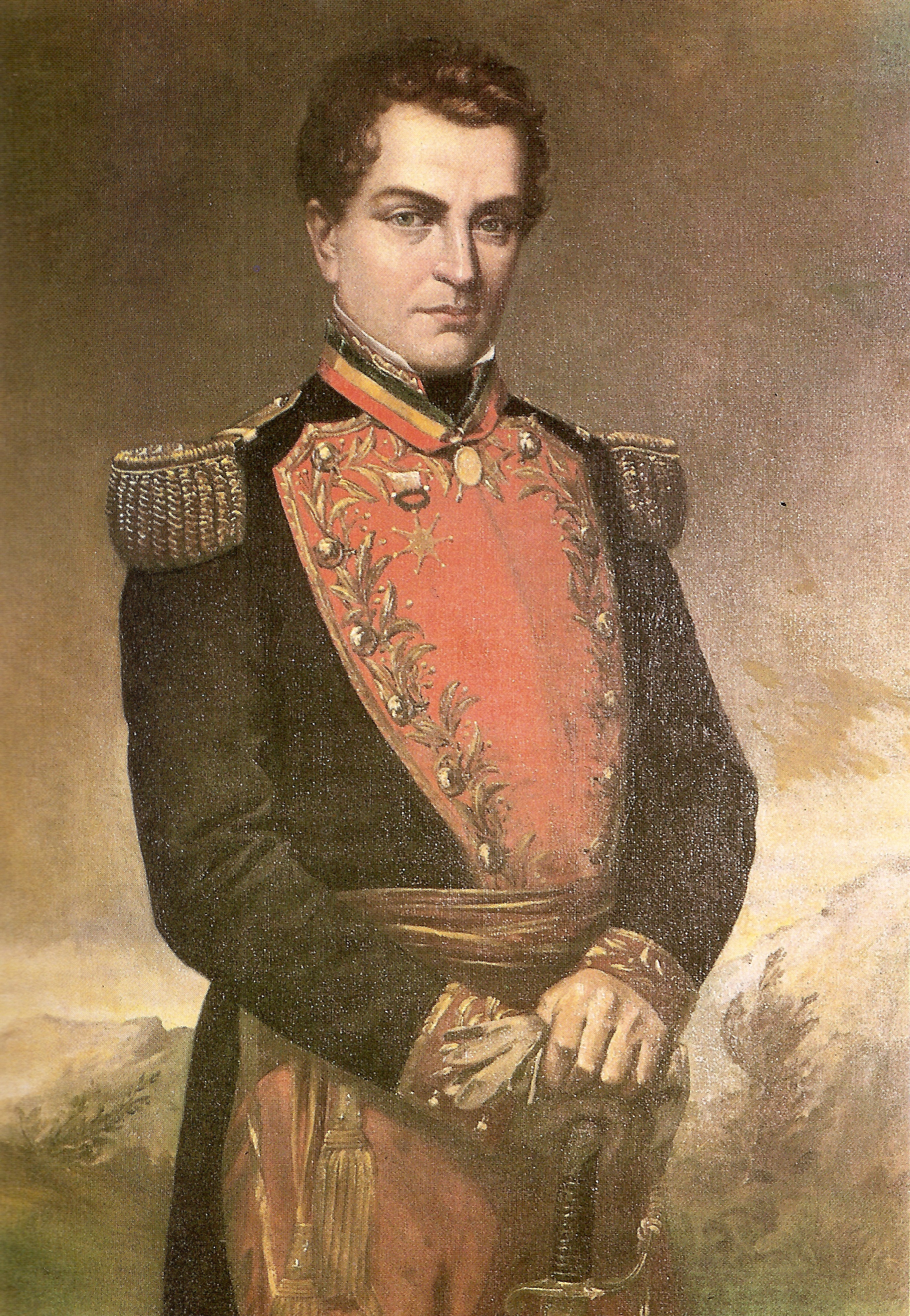
Portrait of Santiago Mariño by Martín Tovar y Tovar

On 2 January 1814, Bolívar became dictator of a Second Republic of Venezuela, which retained the weaknesses of the first republic. Though all of Venezuela but Maracaibo, Coro, and Guayana was controlled by Republicans, Bolívar only governed western Venezuela. The east was controlled by Santiago Mariño, a Venezuelan Republican who had fought Monteverde in the east throughout 1813 and was unwilling to subordinate himself to Bolívar. Venezuela was economically devastated and could not support the republic's armies, and people of color remained disenfranchised and thus unsupportive of the republic. The republic was assailed from all sides by slave revolts and Royalist forces, especially the Legion of Hell, an army of llaneros – the horsemen of the Llanos, to the south – led by the Spanish warlord José Tomás Boves. Beginning in February 1814, Boves surged out of the Llanos and overwhelmed the republic, occupying Caracas on 16 July and then destroying Mariño's power base on 5 December at the Battle of Urica, where Boves died.

As Boves approached Caracas, Bolívar ordered the city stripped of its gold and silver, which was moved through La Guaira to Barcelona, Venezuela, and from there to Cumaná. Bolívar then led 20,000 of its citizens east. He arrived in Barcelona on 2 August, but following another defeat at the Battle of Aragua de Barcelona on 17 August 1814, he moved to Cumaná. On 26 August, he sailed with Mariño to Margarita Island with the treasure. The officer in control of the island, Manuel Piar, declared Bolívar and Mariño to be traitors and forced them to return to the mainland. There, Ribas also accused Bolívar and Mariño of treachery, confiscated the treasure, and then exiled the two on 8 September.

Bolívar arrived in Cartagena on 19 September and then met with the New Granadan congress in Tunja, which tasked him with subduing the rival Free and Independent State of Cundinamarca. On 12 December, Bolívar captured Cundinamarca's capital, Bogotá, and was given command of New Granada's armies in January 1815. Bolívar next grappled with del Castillo, who had taken control of Cartagena. Bolívar besieged the city for six weeks. His change of focus allowed the Royalist forces to regain control of the Magdalena. On 8 May, Bolívar made a truce with del Castillo, resigned his command, and sailed for self-exile on Jamaica as a result of this error. In July, 8,000 Spanish soldiers commanded by Spanish general Pablo Morillo landed at Santa Marta and then besieged Cartagena, which capitulated on 6 December; del Castillo was executed.

=== Jamaica, Haiti, Venezuela, and New Granada: 1815–1819 ===
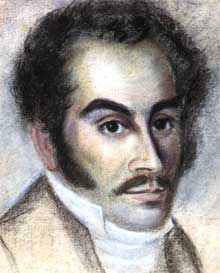
Bolívar in 1816, during his stay in Haiti

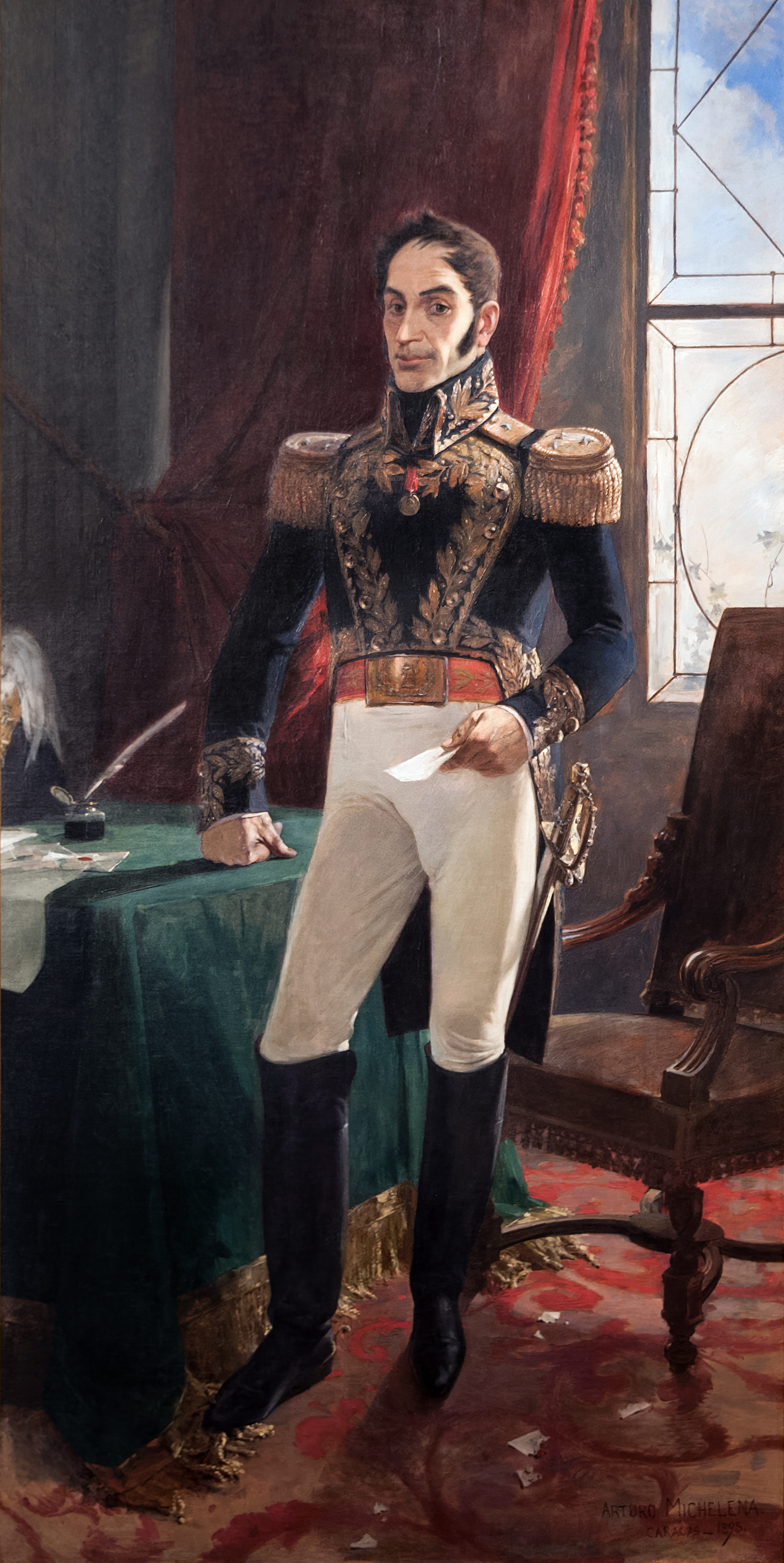
Portrait of Bolívar by Arturo Michelena, 1895

Bolívar arrived in Kingston, Jamaica, on 14 May 1815 and, as in his earlier exile on Curaçao, ruminated on the fall of the Venezuelan and New Granadan republics. He wrote extensively, requesting assistance from Britain and corresponding with merchants based in the Caribbean. This culminated in September 1815 with the Jamaica Letter, in which Bolívar again laid out his ideology and vision of the future of the Americas. On 9 December, the Venezuelan pirate Renato Beluche brought Bolívar news from New Granada and asked him to join the Republican community in exile in Haiti. Bolívar tentatively accepted and escaped assassination that night when his manservant mistakenly killed his paymaster as part of a Spanish plot. He left Jamaica eight days later, arrived in Les Cayes on 24 December, and on 2 January 1816 was introduced to Alexandre Pétion, President of the Republic of Haiti by a mutual friend. Bolívar and Pétion impressed and befriended each other and, after Bolívar pledged to free every slave in the areas he occupied, Pétion gave him money and military supplies.

Returning to Les Cayes, Bolívar held a conference with the Republican leaders in Haiti and was made supreme leader with Mariño as his chief of staff. The Republicans departed Les Cayes for Venezuela on 31 March 1816 and followed the Antilles eastward. After a delay to allow a lover of Bolívar's to join the fleet, it arrived on 2 May at Margarita Island, controlled by Republican commander Juan Bautista Arismendi. Bolívar next moved to the mainland, where he declared the emancipation of all slaves and annulled the Decree of War to the Death. (Note: Masur, Langley, and Arana state that Bolívar issued his proclamation of emancipation in early June. Slatta, de Grummond, and Lynch state that it was issued in July.) He seized Carúpano on 31 May and sent Mariño and Piar into Guayana to build their own army, then took and held Ocumare de la Costa from 6 to 14 July, when it was recaptured by the Royalists. Bolívar fled by sea to Güiria where, on 22 August, he was deposed by Mariño and Venezuelan Republican José Francisco Bermúdez.

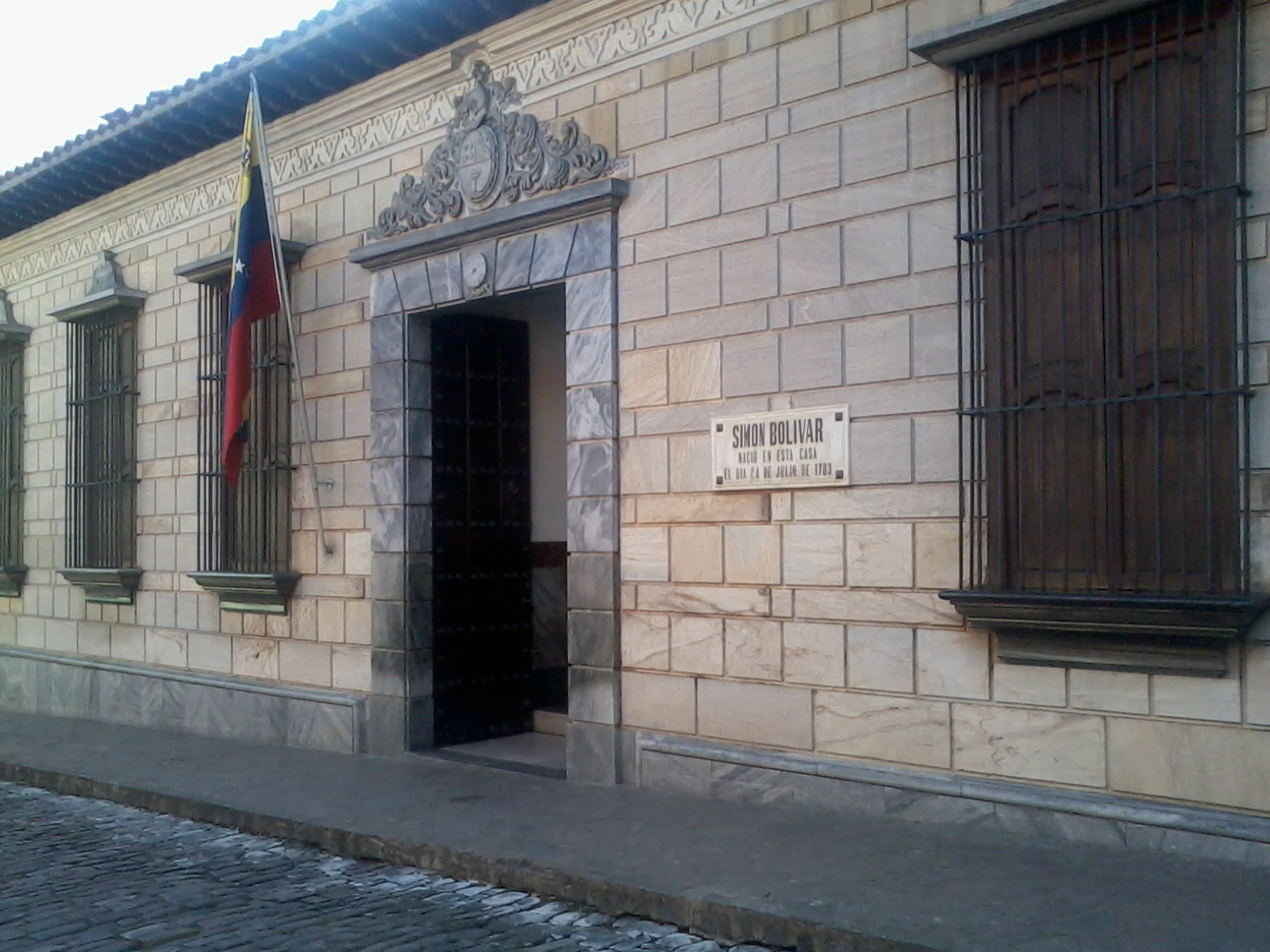
Birthplace of Simon Bolivar in Caracas

Bolívar returned to Haiti by early September, where Pétion again agreed to assist him. In his absence, the Republican leaders scattered across Venezuela, concentrating in the Llanos, and became disunited warlords. Unwilling to recognize Mariño's leadership, Arismendi wrote to Bolívar and dispatched New Granadan Republican Francisco Antonio Zea to convince him to return. Bolívar and Zea set sail for Venezuela on 21 December with Luis Brión, a Dutch merchant, and arrived ten days later at Barcelona. There, Bolívar announced his return and called for a congress for a new, third republic. He wrote to the Republican leaders, especially José Antonio Páez, who controlled most of the western Llanos, to unite under his leadership. On 8 January 1817, Bolívar marched towards Caracas but was defeated at the Battle of Clarines and pursued to Barcelona by a larger Royalist force. At Bolívar's request, Mariño arrived on 8 February with Bermúdez, who then reconciled with Bolívar, and forced a Royalist withdrawal.

Even with their combined forces, however, Bolívar, Mariño, and Bermúdez could not hold Barcelona. Instead, on 25 March 1817, Bolívar began moving south to join Piar in the Guayana campaign, where Piar had his power base, and establish his own economic and political base there. Bolívar met Piar on 4 April, promoted him to the rank of general of the army, and then joined a force of Piar's troops besieging the city of Angostura (now Ciudad Bolívar) on 2 May. Meanwhile, Mariño went east to reestablish his power base and on 8 May convened a congress of ten men, including Brión and Zea, that named Mariño as supreme commander of the Republican forces. This backfired and provoked the defection of 30 officers, including Rafael Urdaneta and Antonio José de Sucre, to Bolívar. On 30 June, Bolívar granted Piar leave of absence at his request, and then issued an arrest warrant on 23 July after Piar began fomenting rebellion, alleging that Bolívar had dismissed him because of his mulatto heritage. Piar was captured on 27 September as he fled to join Mariño and was brought to Angostura, where he was executed by firing squad on 16 October. Bolívar then sent Sucre to reconcile with Mariño, who pledged loyalty to Bolívar on 26 January 1818.

On 17 July 1817, Angostura fell to Bolívar's forces, which gained control of the Orinoco River in early August. Angostura became the provisional Republican capital and in September, Bolívar began creating formal political and military structures for the republic. Following a meeting at San Juan de Payara on 30 January 1818, Páez recognized Bolívar as supreme leader. In February 1818, the Republicans moved north and took Calabozo, where they defeated Morillo, who had returned to Venezuela a year earlier after conquering Republican New Granada. Bolívar next advanced towards Caracas, but was defeated while en route at the Third Battle of La Puerta on 16 March. He escaped assassination by Spanish infiltrators in April. Illness and additional Republican defeats obliged Bolívar to return to Angostura in May. For the rest of the year, he focused on administering the republic, rebuilding its armed forces, and organizing elections for a national congress that would meet in 1819.

=== Gran Colombia: 1819–1830 ===
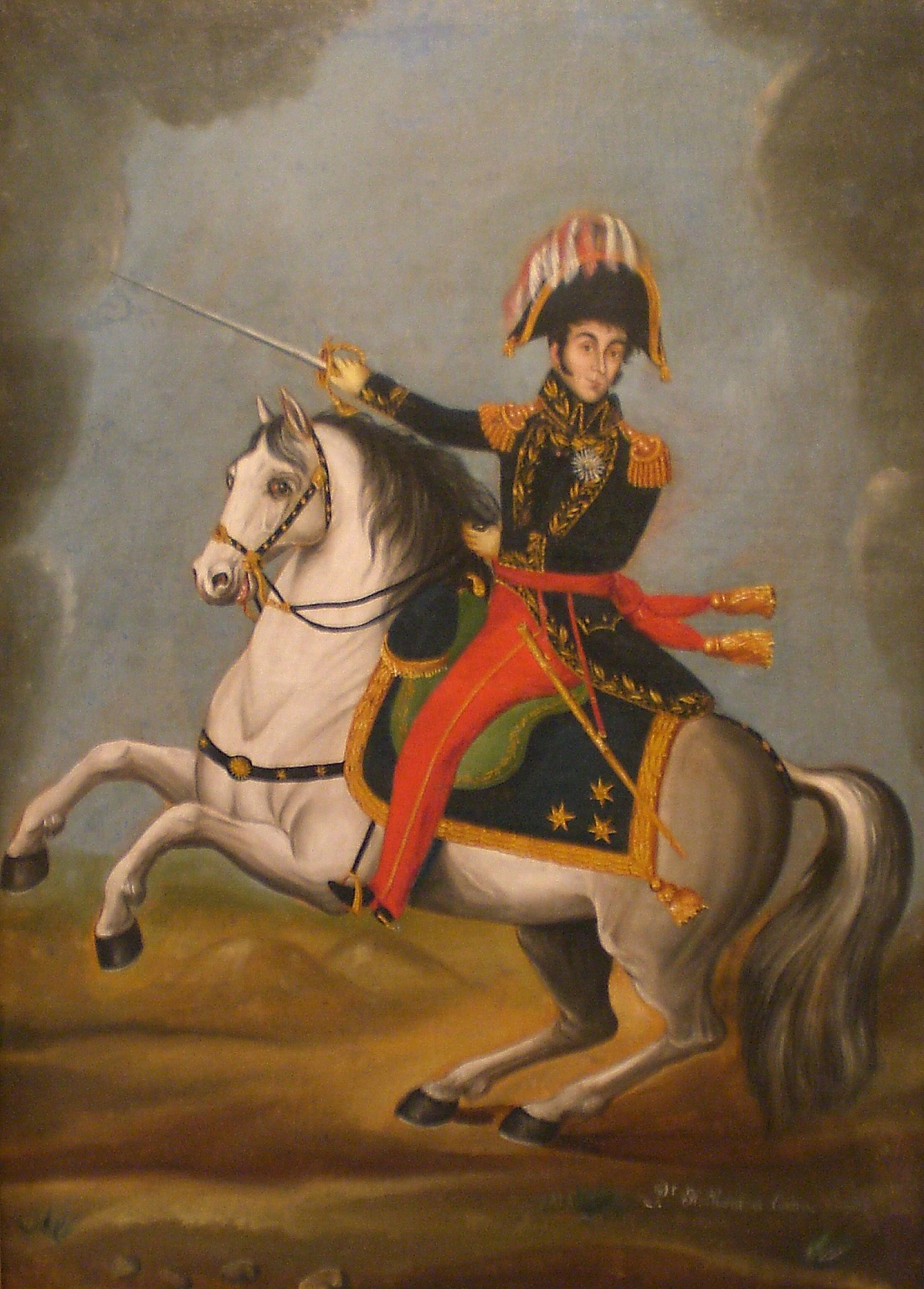
Equestrian portrait of Bolívar by José Hilarión Ibarra, c. 1826

The congress met in Angostura on 15 February 1819. There, Bolívar gave a speech in which he advocated for a centralized government modeled on the British government and racial equality, and relinquished civil authority to the congress. On 16 February, the congress elected Bolívar as president and Zea as vice president. On 27 February, Bolívar left Angostura to rejoin Páez in the west and resumed campaigning against Morillo, albeit ineffectively. In May, as the annual wet season was beginning in the Llanos, Bolívar met with his officers and revealed his intention to invade and liberate New Granada from Royalist occupation, which he had prepared for by sending Santander to build up Republican forces in Casanare Province in August 1818. On 27 May, Bolívar marched with more than 2,000 soldiers toward the Andes and left Páez, Mariño, Urdaneta, and Bermúdez to tie down Morillo's forces in Venezuela.

Bolívar entered Casanare Province with his army on 4 June 1819, then met up with Santander at Tame, Arauca, on 11 June. The combined Republican force reached the Eastern Range of the Andes on 22 June and began a grueling crossing. On 6 July, the Republicans descended the Andes from the Pisba moors and into the plains of New Granada. After a brief convalescence, the Republicans made rapid progress against the forces of Spanish colonel José María Barreiro Manjón until, on 7 August, the Royalists were routed at the Battle of Boyacá. On 10 August, Bolívar entered Bogotá, which Spanish Viceroy Juan de Sámano and his officials had hastily abandoned, and captured the viceregal treasury and armories. After sending forces to secure Republican control of central New Granada, Bolívar paraded through Bogotá on 18 September with Santander.

Desiring to merge New Granada and Venezuela into a "greater republic of Colombia", Bolívar first established a provisional government in Bogotá with Santander, and then left to resume campaigning against the Royalists in Venezuela on 20 September 1819. En route, he learned that Zea had been replaced as vice president in September 1819 by Arismendi, who was conspiring with Mariño against Urdaneta and Bermúdez. Bolívar arrived in Angostura on 11 December and, by being conciliatory, defused the plot. He then proposed the merging of New Granada and Venezuela to the congress on 14 December, which was approved. On 17 December, the congress issued a decree creating the Republic of Colombia, including the regions of Venezuela, New Granada, and the still Spanish-controlled Real Audiencia of Quito, and elected Bolívar and Zea president and vice president respectively.

After Christmas Day, 1819, Bolívar left Angostura to direct campaigns against Royalist forces along the Caribbean coasts of Venezuela and New Granada. He met with Santander in Bogotá in March 1820, then rode to Cúcuta and inspected Republican forces in northern Colombia over April and May 1820. Meanwhile, Morillo's military and political position was fatally undermined by the mutiny of Spanish soldiers in Cádiz on 1 January, which forced Ferdinand VII to accept a liberal constitution in March. News of the mutiny and its consequences arrived in Colombia in March and was followed by orders from Spain to Morillo to publicize the constitution and negotiate a peace that would return Colombia to the Spanish Empire. Bolívar and Morillo, seeking to gain leverage over each other, delayed talks until 21 November, when Colombian and Royalist delegates met in Trujillo, Venezuela. The delegates completed two treaties on 25 November, establishing a six-month truce, a prisoner exchange, and basic rights for combatants. Bolívar and Morillo signed the treaties on 25 and 26 November, then met the next day at Santa Ana de Trujillo. After this meeting, Morillo turned his command over to Spanish general Miguel de la Torre and departed for Spain on 17 December.

In February 1821, as Bolívar was traveling from Bogotá to Cúcuta in anticipation of the opening of a new congress there, he learned that Royalist-controlled Maracaibo had defected to Colombia and been occupied by Urdaneta. La Torre protested to Bolívar, who refused to return Maracaibo, leading to a renewal of hostilities on 28 April. Over May and June, Colombia's armies made rapid progress until, on 24 June, Bolívar and Páez decisively defeated La Torre at the Battle of Carabobo. All Royalist forces remaining in Venezuela were eliminated by August 1823. Bolívar entered Caracas in triumph on 29 June, and issued a decree on 16 July dividing Venezuela into three military zones governed by Páez, Bermúdez, and Mariño. Bolívar then met with the Congress of Cúcuta, which had ratified the formation of Gran Colombia and elected him as president and Santander as vice president in September. Bolívar accepted and was sworn in on 3 October, although he protested the establishment of a precedent of military leaders as head of the Colombian state.

==== Ecuador, Peru, and Bolivia: 1821–1826 ====
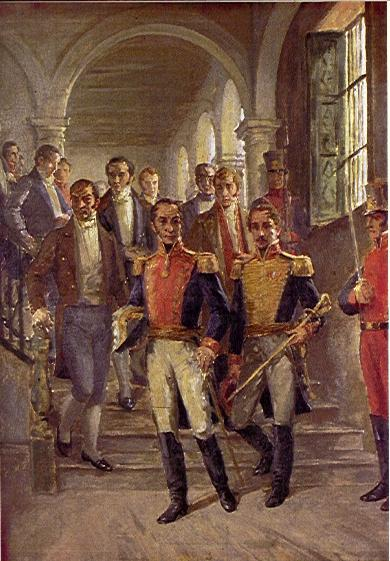
Bolívar and Francisco de Paula Santander during the Congress of Cúcuta, October 1821

After the Battle of Carabobo, Bolívar turned his attention south, to Pasto, Colombia; Quito and the Free Province of Guayaquil, Ecuador; and the Viceroyalty of Peru. Pasto and Quito were Royalist strongholds, while Guayaquil had declared its independence on 9 October 1820 and had been garrisoned by Sucre on Bolívar's orders in January 1821. Panama declared its independence on 28 November 1821 and joined Colombia. Peru had been invaded by a Republican army led by Argentine general José de San Martín, who had liberated Chile and Peru, and Bolívar feared San Martín would absorb Ecuador into Peru. In October 1821, after congress empowered him to secure Ecuador for Colombia, Bolívar assembled an army in Bogotá that departed on 13 December 1821. His advance was halted by illness and a Pyrrhic victory at the Battle of Bomboná in southern Colombia on 7 April 1822.

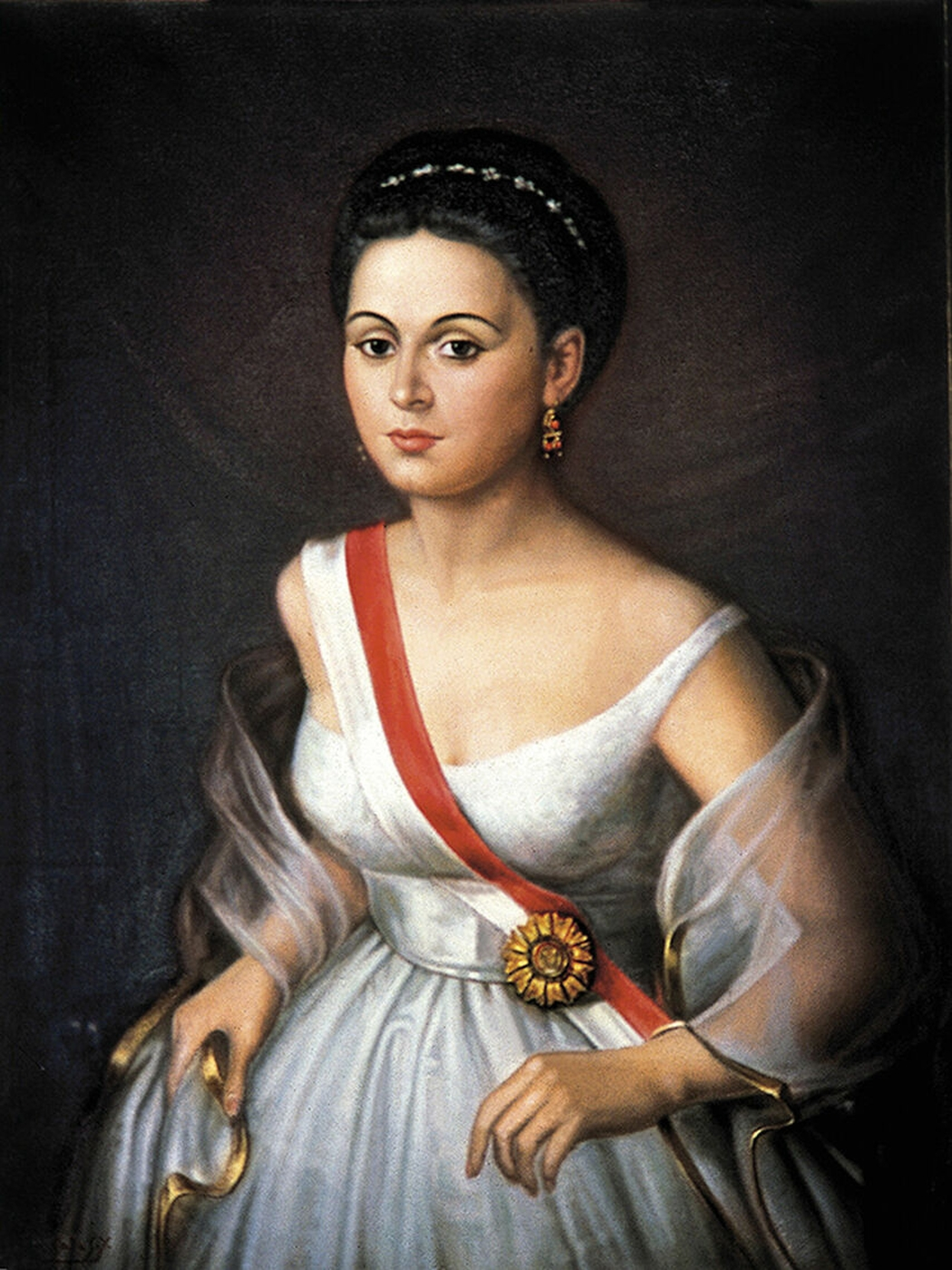
A portrait of Manuela Sáenz by Marco Salas Yepes, 1960

To the south, Sucre, who had been trapped in Guayaquil by Royalist advances from Quito, now advanced, decisively defeated the Royalists at the Battle of Pichincha on 24 May 1822, and occupied Quito. On 6 June, Pasto surrendered, and ten days later Bolívar paraded through Quito with Sucre. He also met the Ecuadorian Republican Manuela Sáenz, the wife of an English doctor, with whom he began a lasting affair.

From Quito, Bolívar traveled to Guayaquil in anticipation of a meeting with San Martín to discuss the city's status and to rally support for its annexation by Colombia. When San Martín arrived in Guayaquil on 26 July, Bolívar had already secured Guayaquil for Colombia, and the two-day Guayaquil Conference produced no agreement between Bolívar and San Martín. Politically isolated and disillusioned, San Martín resigned from his offices and went into exile.

Over the rest of 1822, Bolívar traveled around Ecuador to complete its annexation while dispatching officers to suppress repeated rebellions in Pasto and resisting calls to return to Bogotá or Venezuela. Meanwhile, Royalist forces under general José de Canterac overwhelmed the Peruvian republic. After initially refusing Colombian assistance, the Peruvian congress asked Bolívar several times in 1823 to assume command of their forces. Bolívar responded by sending an army under Sucre to assist, then delayed his own departure to Peru until he obtained permission from the Colombian congress on 3 August. When Bolívar arrived in Lima, Peru's capital, on 1 September, Peru was split between two rival presidents, José de la Riva Agüero and José Bernardo de Tagle, and the Royalists under the Viceroy of Peru, José de la Serna.

In November 1823, Riva Agüero, who plotted with the Royalists against Bolívar, was betrayed by his officers to Bolívar and exiled from Peru. Bolívar crossed out the Peruvians and Quiteños as some "vicious to the point of infamy and low to the extreme" in a letter to Santander, since he saw Peru and Quito as the last royalist strongholds, or in the case of Quito, opposed to Colombia. While Bolívar was bedridden with fever over the first two months of 1824, Tagle defected to the Royalists with the garrison and city of Callao and briefly took Lima. In response, the Peruvian congress named Bolívar dictator of Peru on 10 February 1824. Bolívar moved to northern Peru in March and began assembling an army. His repeated demands for additional men and money strained his relationship with Santander.

In May 1824, conservative Royalist general Pedro Antonio Olañeta, based in the region of Upper Peru, rebelled against la Serna. Bolívar seized the opportunity to advance into the Junín region, where he defeated Canterac at the Battle of Junín on 6 August, driving them out of Peru. Bolívar's victory in Junín put an end to the military campaigns of the Wars of Independence once and for all. Paradoxically, the defeat of Spain also weakened Bolívar, whose legitimacy as Liberator depended on the continuity of the Spanish threat. Choosing to ignore Olañeta, la Serna ordered his forces to concentrate at Cuzco to face Bolívar. Heavy rainfall in September halted Bolívar's advance, and on 6 October he gave command of the army to Sucre and moved to Huancayo to manage political affairs.

On 24 October, Bolívar received a letter from Santander informing him that because he had accepted the dictatorship of Peru, the Colombian congress had stripped him of his military and civil authority in favor of Sucre and Santander, respectively. Although indignant and resentful of Santander, Bolívar wrote to him on 10 November to communicate his acquiescence and reoccupied Lima on 5 December 1824. On 9 December, Sucre decisively defeated la Serna's Royalists at the Battle of Ayacucho and accepted the surrender of all Royalist forces in Peru. The garrison of Callao and Olañeta ignored the surrender. Shortly after arriving in Lima, Bolívar began a siege of Callao that lasted until January 1826, and sent Sucre into Upper Peru to eliminate Olañeta. Olañeta was killed at the Battle of Tumusla prior to Sucre's arrival. With Irish volunteer Francisco Burdett O'Connor serving as his second in command, Sucre completed the liberation of Upper Peru in April 1825.

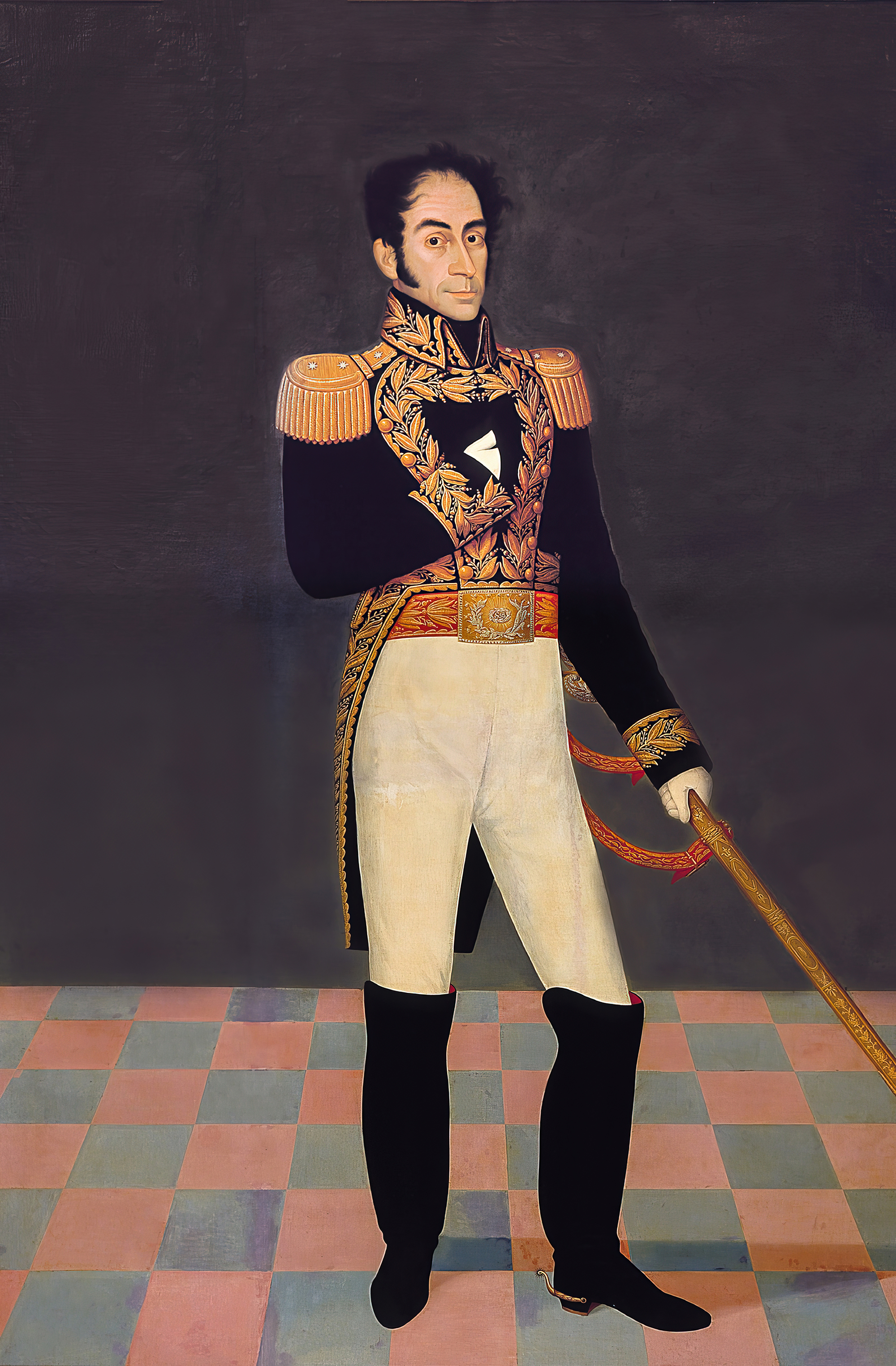
A portrait of Bolívar by José Gil de Castro, 1825

In early 1825, Bolívar resigned from his offices in Colombia and Peru, but neither nation's congress accepted his resignation. On 10 February 1825, the Peruvian congress extended his dictatorship for another year. Accepting the extension, Bolívar settled into governing Peru and passing reforms that were largely not carried out, such as a school system based on the principles of English educator Joseph Lancaster that was managed by Simón Rodríguez.

In April 1825, Bolívar began a tour of southern Peru that took him to the cities of Arequipa and Cuzco by August. As Bolívar approached Upper Peru, a congress gathered in the city of Chuquisaca, now Sucre. On 6 August, it declared the region to be the nation of Bolivia, named Bolívar president, and asked him to write a constitution. Bolívar arrived in Potosí on 5 October and met with two Argentine agents, Carlos María de Alvear and José Miguel Díaz Vélez, who tried without success to convince him to intervene in the Cisplatine War against the Empire of Brazil. The absolute hegemony of Bolívar's army in the region encouraged peripheral elites in Upper Peru to form a new country, independent from Lima. They declared, "If from Romulus, Rome; from Bolívar, it is Bolivia" and offered the presidency to the Liberator. From Potosí, a flattered Bolívar traveled to Chuquisaca and appointed Sucre to govern Bolivia on 29 December 1825.

He departed for Peru on 1 January 1826. Bolívar arrived in Lima on 10 February and dispatched his draft of the Bolivian constitution to Sucre on 12 May. That constitution was ratified with modification by the Bolivian congress in July 1826. Peru, whose elites chafed at Bolívar's rule and the presence of his soldiers, was also induced to accept a modified version of Bolívar's constitution on 16 August. In Venezuela, Páez revolted against Santander, and in Panama, a congress of American nations organized by Bolívar convened without his attendance and produced no change in the hemispheric status quo. On 3 September, responding to pleas for his return to Colombia, Bolívar departed Peru and left it under a governing council led by Bolivian general Andrés de Santa Cruz.

==== Final years: 1826–1830 ====
Bolívar arrived in Guayaquil on 13 September 1826 and heard complaints against Santander's governance from the people of Guayaquil and Quito, who declared him their dictator. From Ecuador, he continued north and heard more complaints, promoted civil and military officers, and commuted prison sentences. As he approached Bogotá, Bolívar was met by Santander, who hoped to persuade Bolívar to his cause in the conflict with Páez. Although Santander was annoyed at Bolívar for his desire to return to power and ratify a version of the Bolivian constitution in Colombia, they reconciled and agreed that Bolívar would resume the presidency of Colombia; congress had reelected them to a second four-year term beginning on 2 January 1827. Bolívar arrived in Bogotá on 14 November 1826.

On 25 November, Bolívar left Bogotá with an army supplied by Santander and arrived at Puerto Cabello on 31 December, where he issued a general amnesty to Páez and his allies if they submitted to his authority. Páez accepted and in January 1827, Bolívar confirmed Páez's military authority in Venezuela and entered Caracas with him to much jubilation; for two months, Bolívar attended balls celebrating his return and the amnesty. That amnesty, and clashes over Santander's handling of Colombia's finances, caused a break between Bolívar and Santander that became an open enmity in 1827. In February 1827, Bolívar submitted his resignation from the Presidency of Colombia, which its congress rejected. Meanwhile, the Colombian soldiers garrisoned in Lima mutinied, arrested their Venezuelan officers, and occupied Guayaquil until September 1827, allowing Bolívar's opponents in Peru to depose him as president and repeal his constitution.

Bolívar departed Venezuela to return to Bogotá in July 1827. He arrived on 10 September with an army he had gathered at Cartagena and secured the calling of a new congress to meet at the city of Ocaña in early 1828 to modify the Colombian constitution. The elections for this congress were held in November 1827 and, as Bolívar declined to campaign because he did not wish to be perceived as personally influencing the elections, were very favorable to his political opponents. In January 1828, Bolívar was joined in Bogotá by Sáenz, but on 16 March 1828 he left the capital after being informed of a Spanish-backed rebellion in Venezuela. As that revolt was crushed before he arrived, Bolívar turned his attention to the occupation of Cartagena by José Prudencio Padilla, a New Granadan admiral and Santander loyalist. Padilla's rebellion was also crushed before Bolívar arrived, and was arrested and imprisoned in Bogotá. As the Convention of Ocaña opened on 9 April, Bolívar based himself at Bucaramanga to monitor its proceedings through his aides.

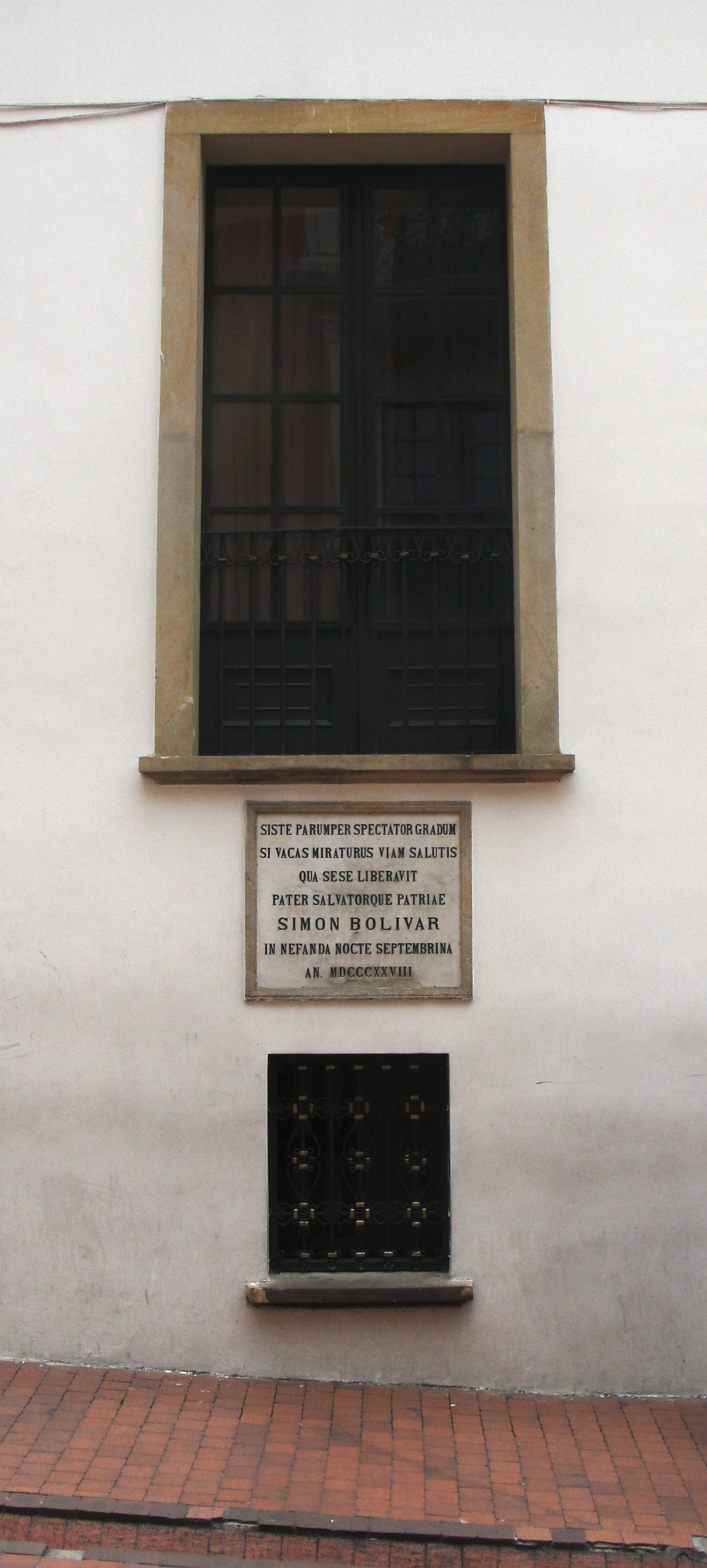
The window of the Palacio de San Carlos through which Bolívar escaped assassination on 25 September 1828

The convention appeared likely to adopt a federalist system. To prevent this, on 11 June 1828 Bolívar's allies staged a walkout, leaving the convention without a quorum. Two days later, Pedro Alcántara Herrán, a Bolívar loyalist and the governor of New Granada, called a meeting of the city's elite that denounced the Convention of Ocaña and called on Bolívar to assume absolute power in Colombia. Bolívar returned to Bogotá on 24 June and on 27 August assumed supreme power as the "president-liberator" of Colombia, abolished the office of the vice president, and assigned Santander to a diplomatic posting in Washington, D.C. On 25 September 1828, a group of young liberals that included Santander's secretary made an attempt to assassinate Bolívar and overthrow his government. The attempt was thwarted by Sáenz, who bought time for Bolívar to escape as the assassins entered the Palacio de San Carlos, and the Colombian Army. Bolívar spent the night hiding under a bridge until soldiers loyal to his regime rescued him.

In the aftermath of the attempted coup, Santander and the conspirators were arrested. Bolívar, depressed and ill, considered resigning from politics and pardoning the conspirators, but was dissuaded from this by his officers. Padilla, though uninvolved with the attempted coup, was executed for treason for his earlier rebellion; Santander, whom Bolívar thought responsible for the plot, was pardoned but exiled from Colombia. In December 1828, Bolívar left Bogotá to respond to Peru's intervention in Bolivia and invasion of Ecuador and a revolt in Popayán and Pasto led by José María Obando. He left behind a council of ministers led by Urdaneta to govern Colombia and announced that a congress would convene in January 1830 to devise a new constitution. Over 1829, Obando was defeated by Colombian general José María Córdova at Bolívar's direction in January and then pardoned, while Sucre and Venezuelan general Juan José Flores defeated the Peruvians at the Battle of Tarqui in February, leading to an armistice in July and then the Treaty of Guayaquil in September.

While Bolívar was away, Urdaneta and the council of ministers planned with French envoys to have a member of the House of Bourbon succeed Bolívar on his death as King of Colombia. This plan was widely unpopular, and inspired Córdova to launch a revolt that was crushed in October 1829 by Daniel Florence O'Leary, Bolívar's aide-de-camp. In November, Bolívar ordered the council to cease its planning; instead they resigned. Venezuelans, encouraged by a circular letter Bolívar had published in October, voted to secede from Colombia. On 15 January 1830, Bolívar arrived in Bogotá and on 20 January the Admirable Congress convened in the city. Bolívar submitted his resignation from the presidency, which the congress did not accept until 27 April, following the appointment of New Granadan politician Domingo Caycedo as interim President. The end of the war in a stalemate demonstrated to Bolívar, who dreamed of a federated Latin America, that its capacity to project power had limits.

== Death and burial ==
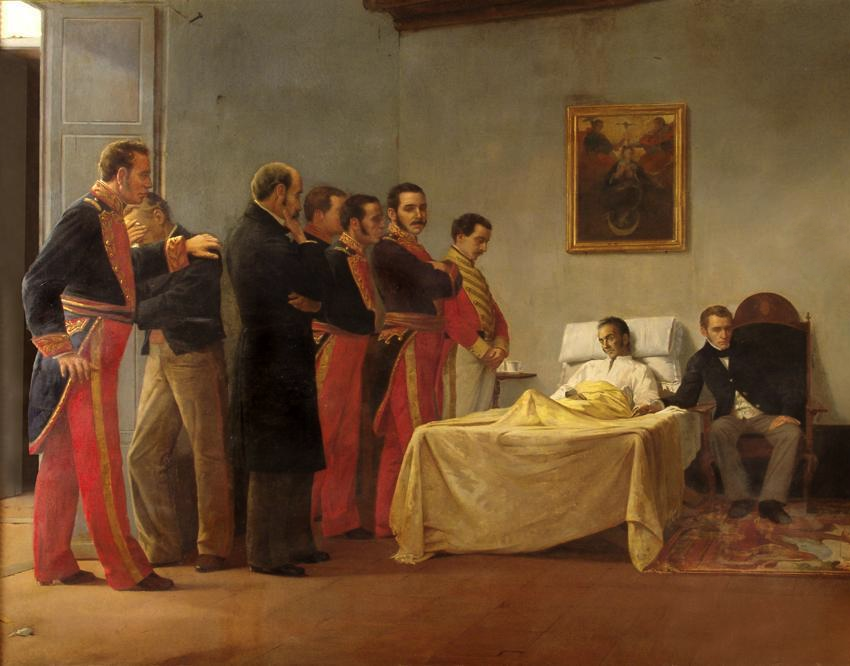
Bolívar's death, by Venezuelan painter Antonio Herrera Toro, 1889

Determined to go into exile, Bolívar, who had given away or lost his fortune over his career, sold most of his remaining possessions and departed from Bogotá on 8 May 1830. He traveled down the Magdalena River to Cartagena, where he arrived in late June to wait for a ship to take him to England. On 1 July, Bolívar was informed that Sucre had been assassinated near Pasto while en route to Quito, and wrote to Flores to ask him to avenge Sucre. In September, Urdaneta installed a conservative government in Bogotá and asked Bolívar to return, but he refused. With his health deteriorating and no ship forthcoming, Bolívar was moved by his staff to Barranquilla in October and then, at the invitation of a Spanish landowner in the area, to the Quinta de San Pedro Alejandrino near Santa Marta. There, on 17 December 1830, at the age of 47, Bolívar died of tuberculosis.

Bolívar's body, dressed in a borrowed shirt, was interred in the Catedral Basílica de Santa Marta on 20 December 1830. In 1842, Páez secured the repatriation of Bolívar's remains, which were paraded through Caracas and then laid to rest in Caracas Cathedral in December together with his wife and parents; Bolívar's heart remained in Santa Marta. His remains were moved again in October 1876 into the National Pantheon of Venezuela in Caracas, constructed that year by President Antonio Guzmán Blanco.

Bolívar's death has been the subject of conspiracy theories advanced by the United Socialist Party of Venezuela. In January 2008, President Hugo Chávez set up a commission to investigate his claim that Bolívar had been poisoned by "New Granada traitors". The commission exhumed Bolívar's remains on 16 July 2010. The results, made public on 26 July 2011, were inconclusive; vice president Elías Jaua announced that the commission could not prove Chávez's claim. Chávez continued to claim that Bolívar had been assassinated via arsenic poisoning, citing a paper by infectious disease specialist Paul Auwaerter. Following Chávez's remarks, Auwaerter stated that the arsenic likely came from medicines Bolívar had ingested to treat his illnesses.

== Personal beliefs ==
Bolívar's personal beliefs were scattered, rife with changing perspectives, as his campaign evolved. His politics were primarily motivated by the intellectual output of the French Revolution, and he himself aligned with republicanism, shaping it into a singular powerful executive authoritarianism, motivated by fear of racial division and royalist infiltration, the structure of which he derived from Classical and Enlightenment philosophy; among his favorite authors were Thomas Hobbes, Baruch Spinoza, the Baron d'Holbach, David Hume, Montesquieu, and especially Jean-Jacques Rousseau. The tutelage of Simón Rodríguez, a student of Rousseau, has been traditionally seen as foundational for Bolívar's beliefs. Also important to Bolívar's intellectual development were his stays in Paris from 1804 to 1806 and in London in 1810. The extent of Bolívar's religiosity is debated; while Bolívar resented the social capital of the Catholic Church and its Royalist leanings during the wars of independence, he sought to co-opt its social capital for the benefit of the republics he established rather than dismember the Church.

Bolívar's political and personal beliefs evolved in writing throughout his life, visible through a series of manifestos and congressional addresses written between 1812 and 1819. These would be named the Jamaica Letter, Cartagena Manifesto, and Angostura Address. The Jamaica Letter was said to be a "blueprint of Bolívar's political thought" while the Cartagena Manifesto as "one of the great documents of Latin American history". Throughout his political career, Bolívar concerned himself with the construction of revolutionary republics in Latin America and the region's place in the Atlantic world. Through the 1820s, Bolívar became increasingly disillusioned and authoritarian until, in 1830, he declared to Flores, "all who have served the Revolution have plowed the sea."

Bolívar also sought British aid against the Spanish Empire to secure Latin American independence. By the 1820s, his goal was to create a federation of Latin American revolutionary republics, each governed by a strong mutual executive like the United States of America, and a constitution modeled largely on the British constitution. Inspired by Montesquieu, Bolívar believed that a government should conform to the needs and character of its region and inhabitants; in the Cartagena Manifesto, Bolívar stated that federalism as practiced in the United States was the "perfect" government but was unworkable in Spanish America, because he believed Spanish imperialism had left Spanish Americans unprepared for federalism; "as long as we do not have the political virtues that distinguish our brothers of the north, a democratic system… can only bring us ruin." Bolívar sought to prepare Colombia in particular for a more liberal democracy via free, public education. At the Angostura Address, he argues for the abolition of slavery and a concession to pardo, mixed race and black rights. He envisioned a racially united Latin America to drive out the Spaniards and create a free South America with a common people.

Bolívar was also very critical of racial groupings and of democracy. Within the Jamaica Letter he recognized the necessity of overthrowing the monarchies in North America, while critiquing their installed democracy as inappropriate for a population held back by years of slavery, as it could ruin the unified South America he wished to create. The blueprint for his strong belief in a powerful executive leader begin to form here, as he insists "His America needed a strong, centralized government, not a perfectly conceptualized, theoretical model dreamed up by idealists on some far-flung shore" due to his views on racial divisions, he saw it necessary for himself to rule as a dictator to avoid racial conflict and civil war, believing that mixed races would create oppression against criollos, should they rise to leadership. In one of his most authoritarian acts, he ordered the arrest and execution of his former pardo general Manuel Piar for his growing contempt of Bolívar and rising anti-Bolivarian sentiment among the pardos. Bolívar intended to be a president for life, a "benevolent" dictator to firmly rule his liberated Americas to prevent racial divide and hierarchical disruption by the pardos.

== Legacy ==
Bolívar is the preeminent symbol of Latin America and the focus of what could seem almost unrivaled posthumous attention, seen from his own times forward as a force now for liberalism or other forms of modernity, now for old regime values and authoritarianism, now for a mix of the two, with the debate over the meaning of his figure having no end in sight.

— Robert T. Conn, Bolívar's Afterlife in the Americas

Bolívar has had an immense legacy, becoming the essential personality of Latin America. The currencies of Venezuela and Bolivia—the bolívar and boliviano respectively—are named after Bolívar. In the English-speaking world, Bolívar is known as Latin America's George Washington. He has been memorialized across the world in literature, public monuments, and historiography, and paid tribute to in the names of towns, cities, provinces, ships, and people.

The Quinta near Santa Marta has been preserved as a museum to Bolívar and the house in which he was born was opened as a museum and archive of his papers on 5 July 1921. In 1978, UNESCO created the International Simón Bolívar Prize "to reward an activity of outstanding merit in accordance with the ideals of Simón Bolívar". In 1997, the Archive of the Liberator Simón Bolívar was inscribed by UNESCO in the Memory of the World International Register and in the Regional Register for Latin America and the Caribbean in 2011.

Initial historical evaluations of Bolívar were at first negative, consisting of criticism of his conduct of the war, execution of Piar, betrayal of Miranda, and authoritarianism. These and other criticisms endure in studies of Bolívar. Beginning in 1842, popular opinion about Bolívar in Venezuela became overwhelmingly positive and eventually became what has been described by scholars as the "cult of Bolívar", led by succeeding heads of the Venezuelan state. In 1998, President Hugo Chávez, who had made extensive use of Bolívar's image for government projects and initiatives, changed the official name of Venezuela to the Bolivarian Republic of Venezuela.

In Colombia, allegiance or opposition to Bolívar formed the bedrock of the Conservative and Liberal parties, respectively. Bolívar continued to have such a cultural influence in Colombia that in 1974 the 19th of April Movement, an insurgent leftist group that later joined an alliance thereof called the Simón Bolívar Guerrilla Coordinating Board, stole a sword alleged to belong to Bolívar from his Bogotá residence.

== See also ==
- Libertadores
- Toussaint Louverture
- Crown of Simón Bolívar
- Bolivarianism
- Congress of Panama
- Father of the Nation
- Palomo (horse)
- Bolivar commemorative stamp

Political offices
New office	President of Colombia; 1819–1830	Succeeded by Domingo Caycedo
New office	President of Bolivia; 1825	Succeeded by Antonio José de Sucre
