= Casa de Las Primeras Letras =

Historic site and museum in Caracas

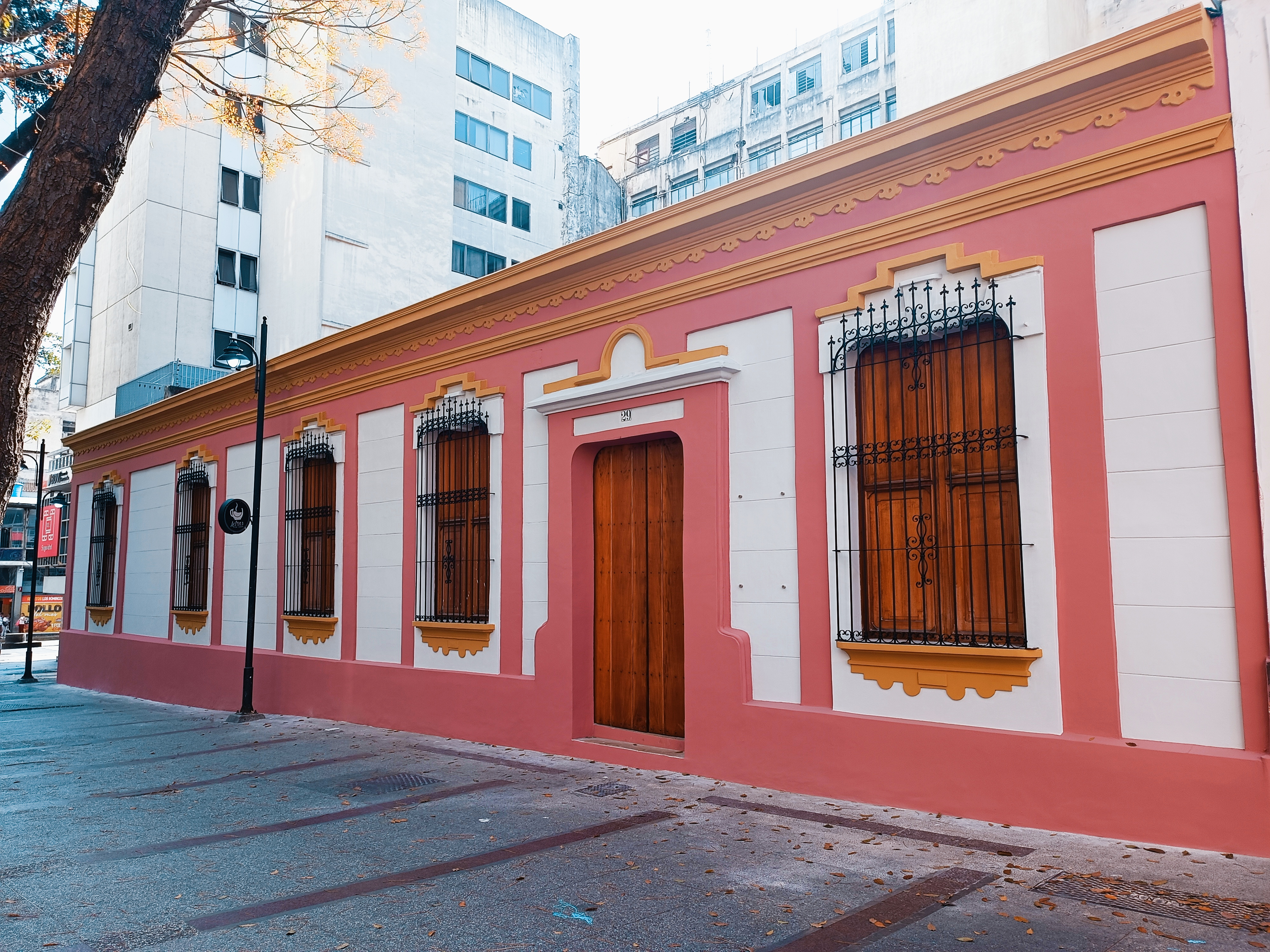

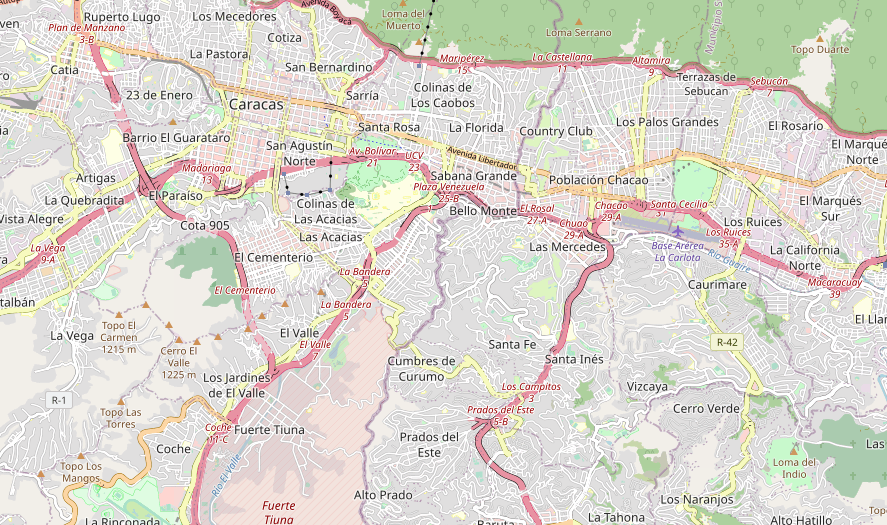
- Location within Caracas
- Location: Caracas, Venezuela
- Coordinates: 10°30′29″N 66°54′50″W

The Casa de Las Primeras Letras (English: House of the First Letters, as in early education) is a building in Caracas, Venezuela which served as a primary school for educator Simón Rodríguez in the 1790s. Among his students was Simón Bolívar. Later, the same building was used as a school by José Martí. It was refurbished from 2010-2012 and is now a museum.

== History ==
The building was built in 1538 when Diego de Losada laid out Caracas. It was formed out of two residences, houses 29 and 31, whose original resident's children married, thus allowing the structures to be made into one. In 1791, Rodríguez received his teaching certification and he began teaching at the school. The school was crowded and had poor resources, with Bolivar's class in 1793 having 114 students and a problem with truancy. This was only the first of several schools he would try to operate according to his famous principles, which included inquisitive children, teaching the children working skills, providing a universal education and giving students an education that produces social, anti-selfish values. He tried similarly in Bogotá and Chiquisaca too. He later fled Venezuela in 1797 after the failed Gual and España conspiracy.

After Rodriguez, it eventually became the Santa María school run by José Martí in the 1880s. After that, it had a couple more owners, eventually falling into disrepair. In 2010, as part of bicentennial celebrations, the museum was renovated by the Libertador Municipality and renovated for Bs.S. 50,000,000, becoming a museum in 2012. The museum features "holographic" displays of Rodríguez and Bolívar, displays of the dress and life of the time, as well as some of the original wall and floor of the building. A stained glass window also survives.
