= Battle of Aragua de Barcelona =

1814 battle in the Venezuelan War of Independence

- Part of Venezuelan War of Independence
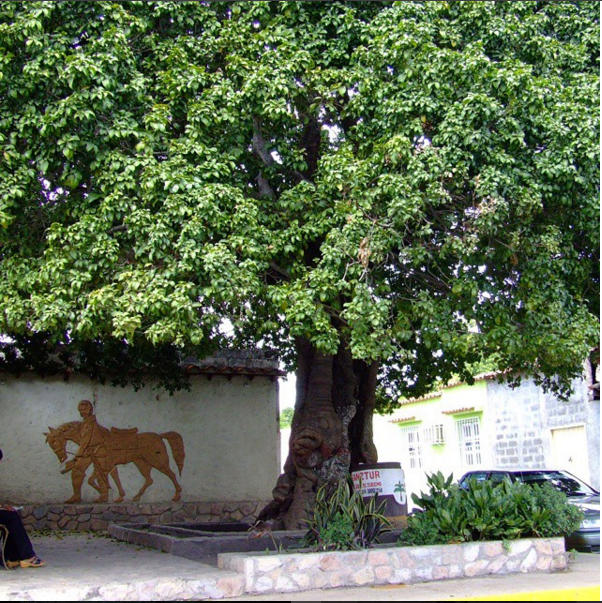
- A Cotoperí tree that Bolívar is said to have tied his horse up to and rested near
Date	17 August 1814
Location	Aragua de Barcelona 9°27′27″N 64°49′34″W
Result	Royalist victory

Belligerents
Second Republic of Venezuela	Spanish Empire

Commanders and leaders
Simón Bolívar; José Francisco Bermúdez; José Tadeo Monagas (WIA)	Francisco Tomás Morales

Strength
3,000–4,000	6,000–8,000

Casualties and losses
<3,000–3,700 dead	1,000 dead, 2,000 wounded

The Battle of Aragua de Barcelona (Spanish: Batalla de Aragua de Barcelona) was fought between Royalists of the Spanish Empire and the Second Republic of Venezuela on 17 August 1814. The battle saw Royalists attack Simón Bolívar's force of 3,000 and win with their 8,000 soldiers. It was a major loss for the Patriots.

== Background ==
After the victory of José Tomás Boves in the Second Battle of La Puerta (15 June), Simón Bolívar evacuated on 6 July what remained of his Patriot army from Caracas, accompanied by two thirds of the population, which were terrified by Boves' reputation for extreme cruelty. This Emigration to the East arrived in Barcelona on 29 July, after having suffered thousands of deaths.

El Libertador Simón Bolívar was in Aragua de Barcelona when he learned of the approach of Spanish commander Francisco Tomás Morales, who was in pursuit of the Patriot column, from San Diego de Cabrutica. He gathered a force 2,000 strong and was met by José Francisco Bermúdez who brought with him another 1,000. Fortifications were erected to protect the town from the much larger attack from Morales, who had 6,000 to 8,000 men.

Prior to the main course of battle, a contingent led by José Tadeo Monagas marched with 700 men, including two cavalry contingents, that tracked down and attacked Morales' force, and were able to cause the loss of 600 men, munitions, guns, and horses using a cavalry charge.

== Battle ==
Simón Bolívar sought to deploy the cavalry against the Royalist forces, but José Francisco Bermúdez made him wait until the Royalists had already reached the entrenchment. This modification proved to be ineffective against the enemy, and Royalist horses ran unabated while the infantry encircled many Patriot controlled areas. The breaching of the fortification prompted Bolívar to leave the city with 100 soldiers, and only four hours later an assault was made with 250 men by Monagas to destroy two Spanish artillery pieces, which failed and saw nearly all of them wounded or killed. The city soon fell to the Spanish after seven hours of battle.

== Aftermath ==
The battle was a major loss for the Patriots. In the aftermath, Bolívar retreated to Cumaná, while Bermúdez retreated to Maturín.

Patriot General José Félix Ribas proclaimed himself Supreme Chief of the West and ordered that Bolívar and Santiago Mariño must go into exile in Cartagena de Indias (Colombia), where they arrived on 19 September. José Félix Ribas was not able to stop the Royalists. He was defeated in the Battle of Urica and the Fifth Battle of Maturin, was taken prisoner and executed by beheading on 31 January 1815.
