= Magdalena campaign =

1812-1813 military operation in New Granada

The Magdalena campaign
- Part of Spanish American wars of independence
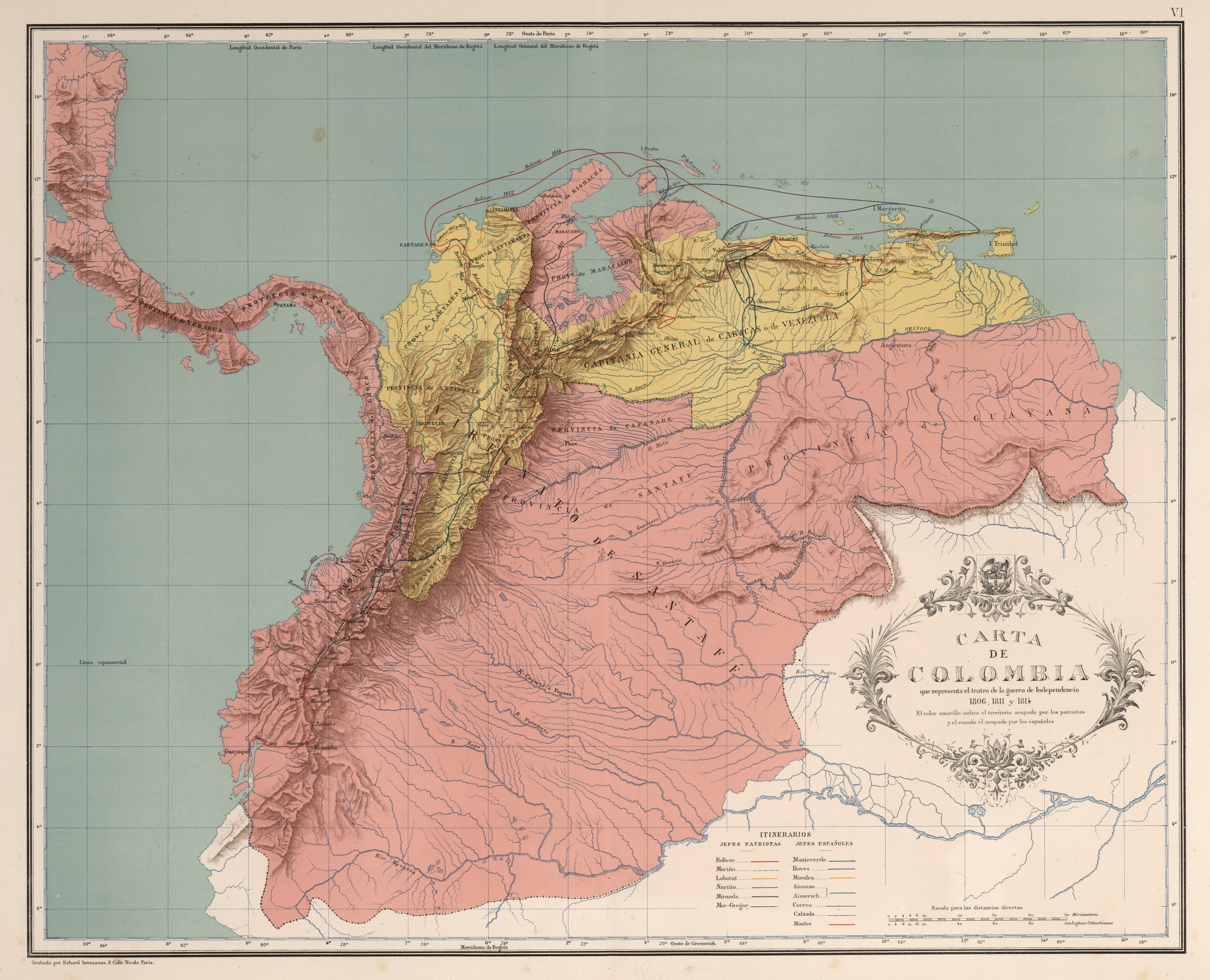
- Conflicts in New Grenada, 1806–1814.
Date	1812–1813
Location	Magdalena River, Viceroyalty of New Granada
Result	Republican control of the lower Magdalena region until the Spanish reconquest of New Granada (1815–1816)

Belligerents
United Provinces of New Granada	Kingdom of Spain

Commanders and leaders
Simón Bolívar; Pierre Labatut	Aguardole Rebustillo

The Magdalena campaign was a military operation from late 1812 to early 1813, led by the independentists Simón Bolívar and Pierre Labatut against royalists and the crown of Spain in New Granada (present-day Colombia). The campaign resulted in the revolutionary United Provinces of New Grenada taking control of the Magdalena River, which connects the port city of Cartagena with the interior of Colombia.

== Background ==
In April 1812 the First Republic of Venezuela collapsed under the assault of royalist forces led by the Spanish captain Domingo de Monteverde, leading to the reestablishment of the Captaincy General of Venezuela. As a result, many members of the independence movement, including Simón Bolívar, fled to Cartagena from Venezuela.

Cartagena had declared independence on 11 November 1811, becoming the first revolutionary bastion of the region. The neighboring city Santa Marta had flirted with independence with the creation of the Junta Superior Provincial de Santa Marta on 10 August 1810 but it was deposed only 5 months later on 22 December. Thus began a protracted period of war between the royalists of Santa Marta and the republicans of Cartagena.

In September 1812 several royalist insurrections broke out within Cartagena Province carried out by indigenous communities in Corozal and Tolú, fomented by local priests and exacerbated by Cartagena's constant demands for supplies on the surrounding countryside. The royalists took advantage of social resentment of indigenous people against creoles and mestizos. The indigenous population was generally opposed to a liberal revolution that represented the possible abolition of their rights and the loss of the cooperative spirit of the old regime. The royalists were thus able to block traffic on the Magdalena River, a significant blow to Cartagena as the city depended on the river to receive supplies from the interior. The city was left isolated and surrounded by royalist troops in Ayapel and Panama to the east and Santa Marta to the west, all of which were receiving a steady stream of supplies from Cuba.

Looking for support to mount a campaign to recapture Venezuela, Bolívar and other exiles published the Cartagena Manifesto on 15 December 1812, a political and military analysis of the causes of the downfall of the First Republic of Venezuela. The manifesto also exhorted the United Provinces of New Granada to not commit the same errors as Venezuela such as embracing federalism, religious fanaticism, or engaging in political in-fighting.

== Campaign ==
Soon after his arrival in Cartagena Bolívar requested a commission in the city's army but he was only given command of a garrison of 70 men in the small town of Barrancas. Bolívar was initially placed under the command of the French adventurer Pierre Labatut. The royalists from Santa Marta prepared to march against Cartagena by assembling a force of one thousand five hundred soldiers on the banks of the Magdalena River; their first target was Mompox whose residents fought back. Nevertheless, the royalists prevailed, taking Momox along with Guamal, Valledupar and Riohacha. In the meantime many of the republican exiles from Venezuela joined up with colonel Manuel Cortés Campomanes, who advanced down the Magdalena with a force of six hundred men, but were ambushed by royalist militias under the command of Aguardole Rebustillo at the confluence of the Mancomaján River. Two days later they clashed again in the village of Oveja. Both battles were won by the republicans. Rebustillo escaped back to Santa Marta while Cortés Campomanes turned his attention to putting down the royalist insurrections in the surrounding towns.

Against Labatut's orders, Bolívar decided to take the initiative by attacking the royalists occupying villages along the banks of the Magdalena while they collected supplies and reinforcements. He successfully dislodged the royalists from Tenerife, Guamal, El Blanco, Mompós, Tamalameque and the port of Ocaña; and defeated various royalist militias operating in the area and finally took the city of Ocaña on 10 January 1813. The fighting in Bolivar's part of the campaign was relatively light with low casualties.

Labatut started his own campaign with 200 republican militia from Barranquilla and a flotilla of small boats. In early November they took the forts at Sitio Nuevo, El Palmar and Sitio Viejo; confiscating 16 canons and 4 armed launches. Labatut next attacked Gúaimaro on 18 November with 340 soldiers, capturing a large quantity of artillery and munitions and several armed boats. The Frenchman stayed to take control of the local government and root out the remaining royalists who had taken refuge in the San Antonio hills. The lower Magdalena was henceforth under the control of the republicans until the Spanish reconquest of New Granada in 1815.

== Aftermath ==
Following the success of the Magdalena campaign, Bolívar focused on organizing what would become the Campaña Admirable to retake Venezuela. He left his troops under the command of Manuel del Castillo y Rada.

Pierre Labatut for his part, marched against Santa Marta with 500 troops and took the city on 6 January 1813 and plundered it. But on 5 March, they were expelled by a combined force of Guajiro Indians and Royalists. Labatut saved himself only because he was able to board the sailboat "Indagadora" commanded by the peninsular Rafael Tono Llopis, leaving his troops to their fate.

Shortly afterward, the Frenchman Louis Fernand Chatillon, with a flotilla of a brig, two corvettes and some smaller ships, transported a thousand militiamen to retake Santa Marta. They were repelled twice, on 10 and 11 May, and Colonel Chatillon died with four hundred of his men, another hundred were captured along with all the artillery, ammunition and weapons.

On 30 May 1813, Francisco Montalvo y Ambulodi, newly appointed Captain General of the New Kingdom of Granada, arrived at Santa Marta (the Cortes of Cádiz had suppressed the title of Viceroy). The port became the de facto Royalist capital of New Granada, until Pablo Morillo arrived in April 1815 with his huge army to retake the whole of New Granada.

== See also ==
- Campaña Admirable
