= Constitution of Peru (1826) =

Defunct Peruvian constitution ratified in 1826 and repealed in 1827

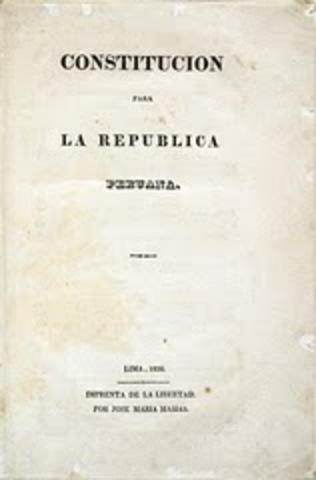
1826 Peru constitution cover page

The 1826 constitution of the Republic of Peru, also known as the "For-Life Constitution" (Spanish: Constitución Vitalicia) was a constitution adopted by the Republic of Peru at the request of Simón Bolívar. In lieu of a formal meeting of the Constituent Assembly of Peru, the constitution was adopted by the electoral college and promulgated on 8 December 1826 by a council of government headed by Peruvian general Andrés de Santa Cruz. Bolívar was sworn in as President of Peru on 7 December, on the second anniversary of the Battle of Ayacucho.

The 1826 constitution was a modified version of the Bolivian constitution, which Bolívar had designed and controversially created a for-life presidency. Bolívar designed that constitution after the liberation of Bolivia from the Spanish and secured its ratification there earlier in 1826, then sought to secure its adoption in Peru and Gran Colombia. With the collapse of his governments in Bolivia and Peru in 1827, however, these constitutions were repealed and Bolívar was deposed as president in both nations. The For-Life Constitution was repealed in Peru on 27 January 1827 and was thus in force for 49 days.

== Background ==
By early 1825, Spanish resistance to Peruvian independence had been reduced to the command of general José Ramón Rodil and the garrison of Real Felipe Fortress, in Callao, on the coast outside of Lima. Peruvians expected that with the end of the Peruvian War of Independence, Simón Bolívar, the Venezuelan general who had led the republican forces as dictator of Peru, would disband his government and restore the 1823 constitution. When the Congress of Peru met on 22 February 1825, however, it extended Bolívar's dictatorship for another year and disbanded itself.

On 20 May 1825, Bolívar issued a degree in Arequipa calling for a congress to meet in Lima on 10 February 1826. The delegates that would make up that congress were to be elected according to the 1823 constitution. Despite pressure from the pro-Bolívar government, some anti-Bolívar delegates were elected, such as the representatives of Arequipa, Francisco Xavier de Luna Pizarro and Francisco de Paula González Vigil. Annoyed, Bolívar secured the expulsion of the anti-Bolívar delegates and thus created a partisan opposition to his policies.
