= Jamaica Letter =

Political document by Simón Bolívar

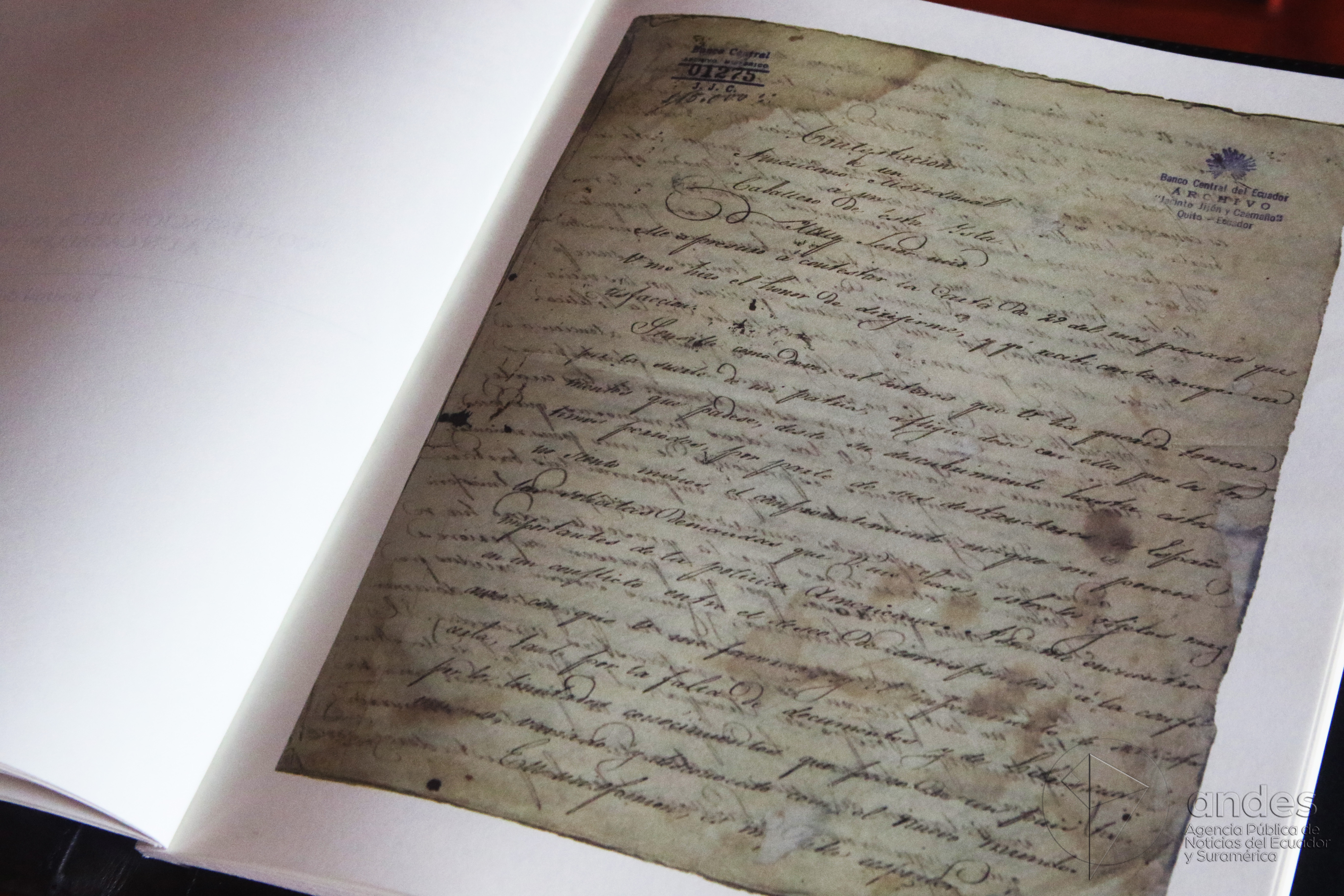
- Original on temporary display at the Palacio de Carondelet, Ecuador in March 2017
- Original title: Carta de Jamaica
- Created: September 6, 1815; 211 years ago
- Location: Ecuador
- Author: Simón Bolívar
- Media type: Letter on paper
- Subject: Discussion of the social and political situation of the Spanish Empire in the Americas and the potential for new nations to be born from it

The Jamaica Letter (or Letter from Jamaica or Carta de Jamaica, also Contestación de un Americano Meridional a un caballero de esta isla "Answer from a southern American to a gentleman of this island") was a document composed by Simón Bolívar in Jamaica in 1815. It sets out his vision for Latin America in the context of the social and political situation and the possible future of the new nations that would be created after the collapse of the Spanish Empire.

Bolívar's letter was a response to a letter (now lost) from Jamaican merchant Henry Cullen. It survives in two versions, the original Spanish version in the hand of Pedro Briceño Méndez and a contemporary English translation, sometimes called the "Bogotá Manuscript", which was intended for publication.

== Historical context ==
=== The fall of the Second Republic of Venezuela ===
In order to rebuild the Republic, the Admirable Campaign took Bolívar very rapidly in just a few months to Caracas on August 6, 1813. However, the whole enterprise came to an end in 1814, when the royalist troops of José Tomás Boves finally defeated the patriot forces and forced Bolívar to retreat, with the additional consequence of being proscribed by José Félix Ribas and Manuel Piar. After this defeat in 1814, Bolívar fled Venezuela with his authority lost and disputed by his own officers. The Second Republic of Venezuela was finally abolished.

=== Return to New Granada ===
Bolívar departed to Cartagena on September 8, 1814. He was in New Granada in October 1814 and stayed until April 1815. Nevertheless, Bolívar did not repeat the victorious experience of 1813 because he was a subordinate of the New Granadine authorities, which requested him to fight against the federalist forces (who opposed the centralist dictatorship of Bernardo Álvarez) rather than the loyalist armies. Unable to deal with the civil war that confronted the patriot factions and having neither political power nor the acceptance of several New Granadines, Bolívar decided to resign his military investiture and to leave the Spanish American society.

=== Exile of Bolívar in Jamaica ===
Bolívar made his way to Jamaica on May 8, 1815, and he arrived there six days later. He aspired to get the attention of the British Empire in order to obtain its cooperation, in which the ideal of Latin American independence means economic profit for England. Therefore, Bolívar made efforts to convince the English gentlemen of his proposals, such as giving to England the Spanish American provinces of Panama and Nicaragua to build waterway later developed as the Panama Canal and the Nicaragua Canal. Bolívar lived in Kingston from May to December 1815 with no military activities, but he dedicated his time to think about the future of the American continent, given the situation of the world's politics.

Bolívar did not have in that year any resources to fulfill his projects of emancipation. In 1815, he gained the sympathy of the British, but he was close to poverty with few material possessions, little money and some slaves; Pío, one of them, tried to assassinate him under the orders given by Pablo Morillo, whose fleet began its voyage from Cádiz to the Spanish America months earlier. In October, Bolívar's economic situation worsened in a point in which he was in despair. According to a letter written to Maxwell Hyslop, Bolívar said that he would end his days "in a violent manner" and that "it is preferable death than a less honourable existence".

Prior to those misfortuned words in October 1815, Bolívar wrote the Carta de Jamaica. Months later, he was required by his New Granadian fellows to help their resistance against Morillo's troops, but it was too late because the loyalist Pacificador took the city of Cartagena. This event made Bolívar change his course to Haiti in order to get reinforcements from Alexandre Pétion. On December 24, Bolívar was no longer in Jamaica.

== The Carta de Jamaica ==
=== Overview ===
The Carta de Jamaica was finished on September 7, 1815, in Kingston. In it, Bolívar began by analyzing what until that time had been considered the historical successes in the struggle for liberty in the Americas. In general terms, it was a balance of force achieved by the patriots in the years from 1810 to 1815. In the middle part of the document are expounded the causes and reasons that justified the "Spanish Americans" in their decision for independence, followed by a call to Europe for it to co-operate in the work to liberate the Latin American peoples. In the third and final part, he speculated and debated on the destiny of Mexico, Central America, New Granada, Venezuela, Río de la Plata, Chile, and Peru.

Finally, Bolívar ends his reflections with an imprecation that he would repeat until his death: the necessity for the union of the countries of the Americas. Even though the Carta de Jamaica was nominally addressed to Henry Cullen, a Jamaican merchant of English origin, it is clear that its fundamental objective was to gain the attention of the most powerful liberal nation of the 19th century, Britain, with the aim that it would decide to involve itself in American independence.

== Access and conservation ==
The Spanish version of the letter is preserved in Ecuador. UNESCO has entered it in the Memory of the World Register in Latin America and the Caribbean.

== Bibliography ==
- Lecuna, Vicente (Comp.). Selected Writings Of Bolivar. Volume I (1810–1822). New York: The Colonial Press Inc., 1951. Translation by Lewis Bertrand.
- Liévano Aguirre, Indalecio (1950). Bolívar. Caracas: Grijalbo, 2007 (1st Repr.).
- Masur, Gerhard (1948). Simón Bolívar. Bogotá: Fundación para la Investigación y la Cultura, 2008 (2nd Edition). Translation by Pedro Martín de la Cámara.
- Pino Iturrieta, Elías (2009). Simón Bolívar. Caracas: Biblioteca Gráfica Nacional. ISBN 9789803952358
