= Cartagena Manifesto =

Work written by Simón Bolívar

- Created: 15 December 1812
- Author: Simón Bolívar
- Signatories: Simón Bolívar
- Media type: Political pamphlet
- Subject: Fall of the First Republic of Venezuela; political and military organization during the Spanish American wars of independence
- Purpose: To explain the defeat of the First Venezuelan Republic, warn New Granada against similar failures, and advocate New Granadan military intervention to recover Venezuela

Full text
- es:Manifiesto de Cartagena at Wikisource

The Cartagena Manifesto (Spanish: Manifiesto de Cartagena), originally titled Memoria dirigida a los ciudadanos de la Nueva Granada por un caraqueño ("Memorial Addressed to the Citizens of New Granada by a Man from Caracas"), was a political and military document was written by Simón Bolívar within the United Provinces of New Granada on december 1812 during the Spanish American wars of Independence, part of the Colombian War of Independence, and Venezuelan war of Independence following the fall of the Venezuelan First Republicand Bolívar's subsequent exile to New Granada, the manifesto was addressed to the New Granadan public and sought support for a military campaign to reconquest Venezuela from spanish royalist control.

This is the first of Bolívar's public documents, which due to his later fame as the "Liberator of five nations," have become quite well known. The document contained the conceptual framework of his new agenda, which he then acted out in the field. He argued that the continued royalist occupation of Venezuela threatened the independence of New Granada and urged its authorities to undertake an offensive campaign to recapture Caracas. The manifesto became one of Bolívar's earliest major political writings and anticipated his subsequent military operations in New Granada and Venezuela, including the Admirable Campaign of 1813.

== Background ==
Prior to the document's publication, Bolívar had been an officer in the Venezuelan army. The First Republic, however, was defeated due to a number of movements that confronted and exploited each other such as the royalists who fought for the old order, the supporters of independence who fought for creole supremacy, and the pardos, blacks, and slaves who fought for their liberation. The conflict was exacerbated by a number of factors such as the shortage of provisions and the effects of the 1812 Caracas earthquake, among others. Bolivar started acting on his own, leaving La Guaira on a Spanish ship. He briefly stayed in Curaçao before finally arriving in Cartagena. He accepted a commission in the army of the United Provinces of New Granada (Colombia), which later granted him permission to lead a force to liberate Venezuela, in what became known as the Admirable Campaign.

== The Manifesto ==
In Cartagena Manifesto, Bolivar outlined a framework that would prevent New Granada from suffering the fate of Venezuela since the territory reproduced the prevailing pattern of colonial dissent from loyal juntas to independent governments. The political, economic, social, and natural causes which Bolivar mentioned included:

- The use of a [federal system], which Bolivar considered weak for a time of war.
- Bad administration of the public income by the republican government
- The earthquake of Caracas of 1812, which worsened the economic and political situation
- The impossibility of establishing a permanent army due to the intransigence of the general population
- The opposing influence of the Roman Catholic Church, which clandestinely promoted anti-republican views

Bolivar advocated a strong central government and powerful executive to avoid infighting between city, state, and national authorities, which in his view created stalemate, dissipating funds and energy. He stated that "the government must necessarily adjust itself, so to speak, to the context of the times, men, and circumstances in which it operates. If these are prosperous and serene, it has to be gentle and protective, but if they are calamitous and turbulent, it has to be severe and armed with a strength equal to the dangers."
