= Fifth Battle of Maturín =

1814 battle in Venezuela

- Part of the Venezuelan War of Independence
Date	11 December 1814
Location	Maturín, Venezuela
Result	Royalist victory

Belligerents
Venezuelan Patriots	(Spain) Royalists

Commanders and leaders
José Félix Ribas; José Francisco Bermúdez; Manuel Cedeño; José Tadeo Monagas	Tomás Morales

Strength
450–500	6,000–7,000

Casualties and losses
Unknown	1,000 dead or wounded

The Fifth Battle of Maturín was a military confrontation on 11 December 1814, that resulted in the epilogue of the Second Republic of Venezuela. The Royalist forces, which for two years had tried to conquer the city, destroyed the last great Patriot garrison that remained in the country.

== Prelude ==
After the defeat in the Battle of Urica 4 days earlier, the Republican Army had all but disappeared. General José Félix Ribas and Colonel José Francisco Bermúdez had managed to escape and gather the dispersed survivors in their headquarters of Maturín. After the death of Caudillo José Tomás Boves, his second Francisco Tomás Morales first secured the command over his Royalist llanero army, and then advanced towards Maturín.

== The Battle ==
Maturín was a place defended by three embankments and two batteries. Solid positions, supported to the north by the Guarapiche river and the swamps to the east, made it easily defensible, but the Republicans had few ammunition and low moral. The garrison was composed of 300 dispersed soldiers and almost 200 recruits. Some officers wanted to retire but their superiors ordered to resist.

Morales arrived with his army at dusk on 10 December. He camped near the city and ordered 1,500 men to occupy the Paso del Hervidero but Manuel Cedeño's cavalry repulsed them with fire support from defensive positions. The next day at 8:00 the Royalists stormed the city. For three hours the Patriots managed to resist the frontal attack, but then a column that had secretly flanked their positions, attacked them from the rear and they panicked.

The llaneros entered the city and murdered everyone they found, to avenge the high casualties caused by the cavalry of Colonel José Gregorio Monagas. Bermúdez fled with 200 men to Mountain Tigre, other Republicans fled to coast, and Ribas with 3 or 4 officers to the plains of Caracas to join Rafael Urdaneta, whom they believed to be in Barquisimeto. Ribas was betrayed, captured and shot on 31 January 1815 in Tucupido. Morales persecuted his defeated enemies with 3,000 soldiers, taking Soro on 14 February, forcing Manuel Piar to flee and the next day he took Güiria, from where Bermúdez had to flee. Morales reduced both places to ashes.

== Consequences ==
This campaign finally ended with the Republican military presence in Continental Venezuela.

Bermúdez escaped with 300 men to Isla Margarita where he helped Juan Bautista Arismendi to organize the garrison, but before the arrival of the expeditionary force of Pablo Morillo, he was exiled to Cartagena de Indias, where he participated in the independence struggle of Colombia.
Former Republican soldiers or sympathizers, who had failed to escape from the Continent were persecuted by the llaneros and massacred, as were their families. It is estimated that some 3,000 people were killed. In Irapa, Colonel Rivero and his garrison of 400 men decided to flee but were intercepted and massacred on 17 February. Irapa was occupied eleven days later by the Royalists, thus eliminating the last Republican urban stronghold in Continental Venezuela.

After this campaign, only some scattered Patriot guerrilla bands were left in sparsely populated area's of Venezuela :

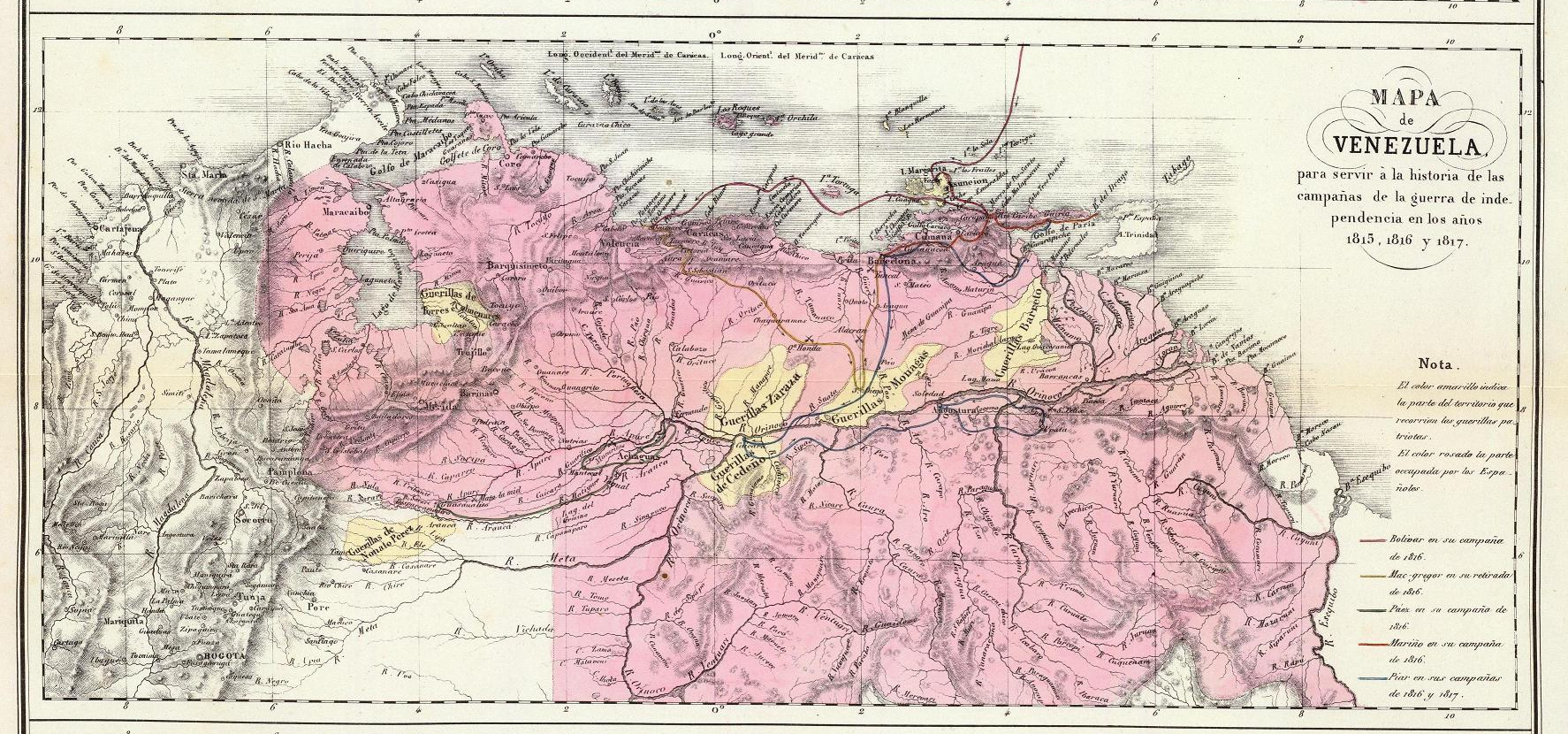
Remaining area's under Republican control in yellow

- José Antonio Páez in Apure with 1,300 men,
- Manuel Piar and Manuel Cedeño in Guayana with 1,800,
- José Gregorio Monagas and Pedro Zaraza in the Eastern Plains with 800,
- Juan Bautista Arismendi on Isla Margarita with 400,
- Santiago Mariño in Cumaná and the coast with 800.

== Sources ==
- Baralt, Rafael María & Ramón Díaz (1841). Resumen de la Historia de Venezuela. Desde el año de 1797 hasta el de 1830. Tomo I. París: H. Fournier y compañía.
- De Armas Chitty, José Antonio (1982). Historia de la tierra de Monagas. Maturín: Ediciones Gobernación del Estado Monagas.
- De Cajigal, Juan Manuel (1960). Memorias sobre la Revolución de Venezuela (in Spanish). Ministerio de Justicia.
- Duarte Level, Lino (1917). Cuadros de la historia militar y civil de Venezuela: desde el descubrimiento y conquista de Guayana hasta la batalla de Carabobo. Madrid: Editorial América.
- Encina, Francisco Antonio (1961). Bolívar y la independencia de la América española: Independencia de Nueva Granada y Venezuela (parte 1). Tomo III. Santiago: Nascimiento.
- Montenegro Colón, Feliciano (1837). Geografía general para el uso de la juventud de Venezuela. Tomo IV. Caracas: Imprenta de Damiron y Dupouy.
- Núñez Jiménez, Antonio (1994). Un Mundo Aparte: Aproximación a la Historia de América Latina y el Caribe. Madrid: Ediciones de la Torre. ISBN 84-7960-043-8.
