= Manuel Cedeño =

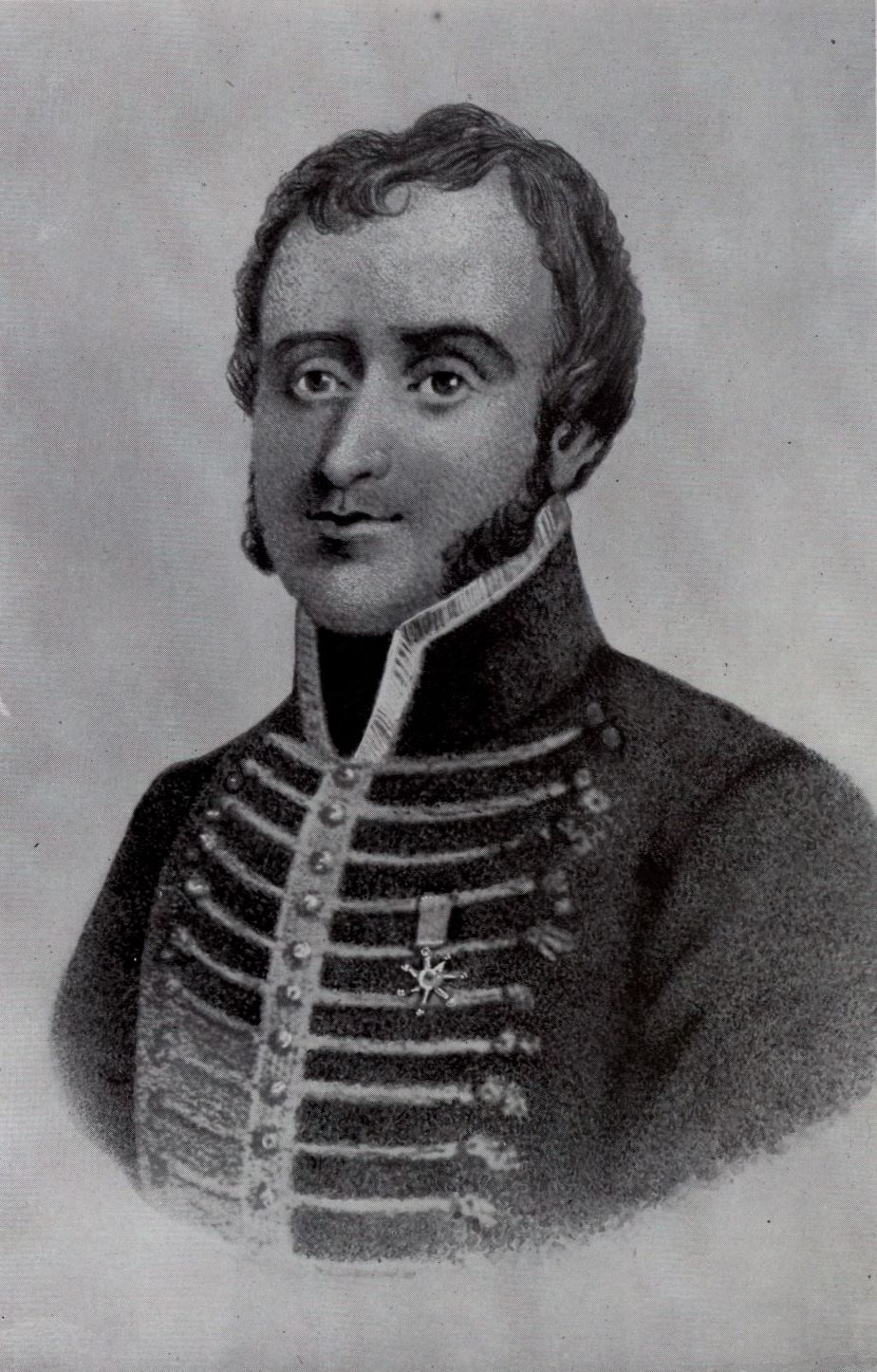
Manuel Cedeño

Manuel Cedeño (6 May 1780 in Cardonal, Aragua state, Venezuela – 24 June 1821 in Battle of Carabobo, Venezuela) was an officer of the Venezuelan Patriot army who reached the position of Division General, who distinguished himself in the Venezuelan War of Independence.

== Biography ==
He was the youngest of the two children of the peasants Manuel Antonio Cedeño and Juana Hernández.

In 1810, he joined the Patriot troops fighting against the Spanish Royalist troops, participating in almost all the battles that occurred in Venezuela between 1813 and 1817.

With José Francisco Bermúdez he took the city of Angostura, evacuated by the Royalists after a long siege on 7 July 1817. By order of Simón Bolívar, he arrested dissident General Manuel Piar in Aragua de Maturín and transferred him to Angostura to be tried by a military court and executed.

In 1818 he accompanied Bolívar in the Central Campaign, winning the Battle of Calabozo (12 February), but suffering defeat at Laguna de los Patos (20 May). He was a deputy of the Congress of Angostura between 15 February 1819 and 31 July 1821.

As a general, he led the II Division of the Army in the Battle of Carabobo (24 June 1821).
After the battle was won, Cedeño wanted to stop the retreat of the Royalist Valencey Battalion, but was hit by a bullet and died that same day.

Since 16 December 1942, his remains rest in the National Pantheon of Venezuela.

== Sources ==
- Busca biografias
- Venezuela Tuya
- Scribd
