= Gual and España conspiracy =

1797 Venezuelan independence movement

The Gual and España Conspiracy (1797) is the name given in Venezuelan history to the first independence movement that sought to separate Venezuela from the Spanish Empire. It began in La Guaira, in the former Captaincy General of Venezuela, was discovered on July 13, 1797, and ended on May 8, 1799. It is considered one of the closest antecedents to the events of April 19, 1810.

Manuel Gual was an infantry captain and a man of refined culture, the son of Spanish Colonel Mateo Gual. José María España held the position of lieutenant of justice in Macuto, Venezuela. Gual and España signed a set of ordinances that included the main objectives of the revolution, the text of which is almost complete below: political emancipation from Spain, the establishment of a republican system, the abolition of slavery, and the establishment of free trade.

"Picture the situation of the inhabitants of North America. They are rich and independent; the powers of Europe covet their alliance. Compare your population with that of that new Republic, and you will see that nature delights in populating the lands of liberty, when the increase of slaves is painful and contrary to its institution. Deserts, solitude, and silence are the consequences of Tyranny throughout the Universe."

— Excerpt from the manifesto of the free inhabitants of Spanish America

== Transfer of the conspirators from San Blas ==
Several Spanish revolutionaries played a significant role in the Gual and España conspiracy, led by the school teacher and economist Juan Bautista Picornell, and including the humanities professor José Lax, the mathematics teacher at the San Isidro school, Sebastián Andrés, the engineer Manuel Cortés Campomanes, the Aragonese lawyer Bernardo Garaza, and others. These Spanish revolutionaries met in the "Libertad" and "España" lodges on Ballesteros Street in Madrid. Following the suppression of the San Blas Conspiracy in Madrid in 1796, the Mayor of the Royal Court, the Count of Pinar, swiftly arrested the conspirators, who were condemned to hang. However, Don Francisco Pérez de Lerma, a lawyer, scholar, and devout Christian, saved Juan Bautista Picornell, José Lax , Sebastián Andrés, Manuel Cortés Campomanes, and others from execution, risking his political standing within the government. Their death sentences were commuted to life imprisonment in the American castles of Puerto Cabello, La Guaira, Portobello, and Panama, by order of King Charles IV on August 17, 1796.

In December 1796 and early 1797, the four European conspirators arrived at the port of La Guaira, where they were imprisoned in the vaults. Shortly thereafter, Picornell and his companions made contact with Manuel Gual and José María España, reinforcing their revolutionary ideas. The movement, which originated in La Guaira and quickly spread to Caracas, was supported by a set of theoretical documents and practical organizational instructions.

== First independence movement ==
This was the first organized movement in Spanish America to propose the formation of republican governments and the equality of its inhabitants without distinction of race or social condition. Individuals from all social classes participated in the conspiracy, with the exception of the wealthy landowners. Among the conspirators were merchants such as Manuel Montesinos Rico; and Creole lawyers Nicolás Ascanio and Luis Tomás Peraza. The military engineers Patricio Ronán and Juan Lartigue de Condé; Royal Treasury officials such as Joaquín Sorondo, Juan José Mendiri, and Martín Goinaga; and the parish priest of La Guaira, Juan Agustín González, were also involved. Lawyers and legal professionals, as well as many artisans, sergeants, corporals, and soldiers - some of mixed race and some of white - were also part of the conspiracy.

Although the Gual and España Conspiracy failed as a revolutionary movement, the texts disseminated during it had a considerable influence on the independence movement in Spanish America. The most important document to emerge from the conspiracy was the "Declaration of the Rights of Man and of the Citizen," containing several republican maxims and a preliminary discourse addressed to the Americans, which included the text of the Declaration of the Rights of Man and of the Citizen as its central part.

== Causes ==
The Gual and España conspiracy was denounced on July 13 by Captain General Pedro Carbonell, who ordered a manhunt for the conspirators, resulting in the arrest of 49 creoles and 21 spaniards. Both Gual and España escaped to the neighboring British colony of Trinidad for the capture of the two revolutionaries, who traveled through Curaçao, Guadeloupe, Martinique, Saint Barthélemy, Saint Thomas, Saint Croix, and Trinidad was offered a reward of 500 pesos. If they resisted, the reward increased to 10,000 pesos for Gual and 5,000 pesos for España.

== Deaths of Gual and España ==
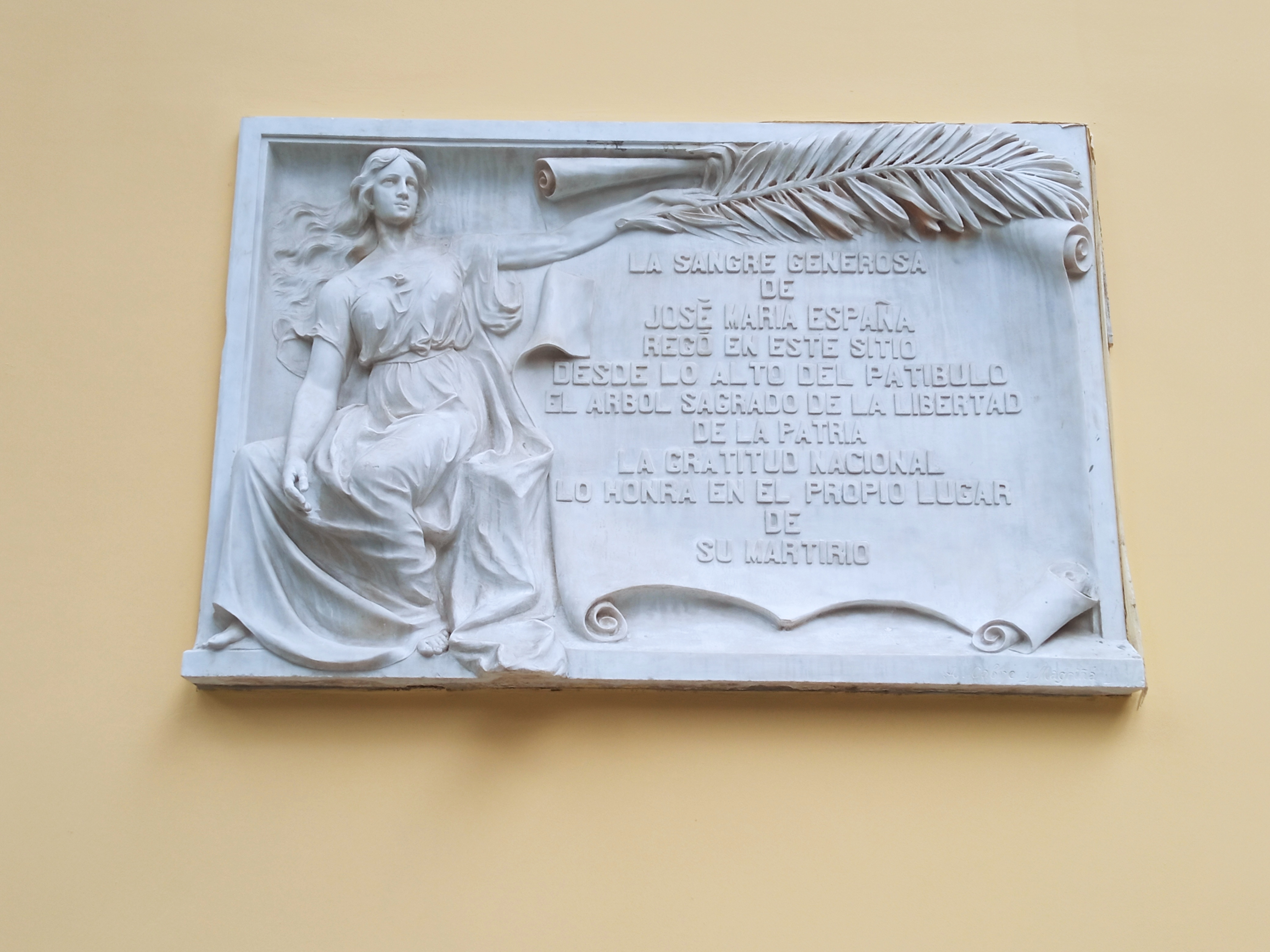
Commemorative plaque at the site where José María España was tortured and killed, in Bolívar Square in downtown Caracas.

Despite the reward offered for his capture, in 1799, José María España secretly returned to Venezuela, but was arrested in La Guaira and sent to Caracas, where the Royal Audiencia sentenced him to death on May 6. He was tortured, hanged, beheaded, and quartered on May 8 in the Plaza Mayor (present-day Plaza Bolívar). Manuel Gual remained in Trinidad, from where he maintained communication with the precursor Francisco de Miranda, who was in London. On October 25, 1800, he died in San José de Oruña, Trinidad, poisoned by a Spanish spy named Valecillos.

== See also ==
- José Leonardo Chirino
