= Apacuana =

16th-century Indigenous rebel from Venezuela

- Born: 16th century Valles del Tuy, present-day Venezuela
- Died: 1577; Province of Caracas, colonial Venezuela, Spanish Empire
- Cause of death: Execution by hanging
- Other names: Apacuane; Apakuama; Apakuana
- Occupations: Curandera (i.e. healer or shaman); cacica (i.e. tribal chief)
- Known for: Her leading role in an Indigenous uprising against Spanish colonization in 1577
- Children: Guásema

Apacuana (pronounced [apaˈkwana])—also transliterated as Apacuane, Apakuama or Apakuana—was a 16th-century woman of the Quiriquires (also known as Kirikires), a branch of the Kalina people that inhabited the Valles del Tuy region (then known by the Spanish as Salamanca), in present-day Venezuela, notable for her leading role in a failed Indigenous uprising against Spanish colonization in 1577. Her story was presented nearly a century and a half later by writer José de Oviedo y Baños in his 1723 book The Conquest and Settlement of Venezuela, a foundational work on the country's history. Introduced by the author as an "elderly sorceress and herbalist", Apacuana is considered to have been a piache, that is, a curandera, a term used in Hispanic America to call a healer or shaman. She was the mother of Guásema, who served as cacique—a term used to designate Indigenous tribal chiefs in Hispanic America—while several modern writers consider her to have been a cacica (feminine form of the title) as well.

Apacuana was highly regarded in her community, both as a healer and as a political leader, which allowed her to instigate an attack against two Spanish colonists as they traversed their territory. In response to the attack, a military unit led by Sancho García was sent from the nearby Spanish settlement of Caracas to punish the natives. In the territory of the Quiriquires, García's company set fire to several settlements and managed to thwart a surprise attack by an army formed from an alliance between different Indigenous groups. Among the prisoners trapped during this combat—from which the Spanish emerged victorious—was Apacuana, who was tortured and hung in full view of the Quiriquires, prompting them to reportedly ask for peace. Nevertheless, the Quiriquires continued to offer resistance to the Spanish, most notably in 1660.

Although often ignored by the hegemonic historiography of Venezuela, Apacuana is regarded a national symbol of Indigenous resistance, as well as a notable figure in the country's women's history. On International Women's Day 2017, the national government transferred the symbolic remains of the Indigenous leader to the National Pantheon of Venezuela, where the main figures of the country's history rest. In 2018, a seven-meter statue of Apacuana was placed in Caracas, causing controversy by replacing an old monument that was considered by some as a symbol of the city.

== Background ==
The story of Apacuana comes from José de Oviedo y Baños' book The Conquest and Settlement of Venezuela (in Spanish: Historia de la conquista y población de la Provincia de Venezuela), a foundational work on Venezuelan history written around 1710, nearly a century and a half after it happened. Oviedo y Baños' main historical source is Fray Pedro Simón's book Noticias historiales de las conquistas de Tierra Firme en las Indias Occidentales (1626). He also went through the books of the Caracas town hall (Spanish: Ayuntamiento de Caracas) while serving as Alcalde de primer voto in 1710, a judicial and administrative title in the Spanish Viceroyalties in the Americas responsible for the administration of justice within their municipal jurisdiction.

Apacuana belonged to the Indigenous Quiriquires (also transliterated as Kirikires), a branch of the Kalina people that lived in the Valles del Tuy, the valley around the Tuy River, in the north-central region of Venezuela. The other ethnic groups that inhabited the area at the time the Spanish arrived were the Arbacos, Caracas, Chagaragatos, Mariches, Meregotos, Taramainas, Tarmas and Teques. In various sections of the book, Oviedo y Baños indicates the location of the Quiriquires. In one passage, he says that the group inhabited an extensive area located in the "thick mountains" on the banks of the Tuy River, which divided their territory from that of the Mariches. Oviedo y Baños also states that the territory of the Quiriques bordered that of the Teques, writing: "Their towns extended along the banks of the Tuy for more than twenty-five leagues, up to the western boundary with the Tumusa tribe". They also bordered the Arbacos and Meregotos. These Indigenous groups maintained political autonomy, but they allied with each other to resist the Spanish invasion.

== Account ==
Apacuana's name has also been transliterated as Apacuane, Apakuama or Apakuana. Writer Emilio Salazar claims that the name Apakuama comes from the Cumanagoto language, meaning "beautiful mountain", and formed by the words apak ("mountain") and uama ("beautiful"). Oviedo y Baños introduces her as an "elderly sorceress and herbalist". Therefore, she is considered to have been a piache, that is, a curandera, a term used in Hispanic America to call a healer or shaman. Today, Apacuana is also described as a cacica, the feminine form of cacique, an exonym used to designate Indigenous tribal chiefs in Hispanic America. She was the mother of the cacique Guásema, also transliterated as Guacema. Apacuana was highly respected in her community, both for her role as a sorceress as well as political leader, which allowed her to instigate an attack against the Spanish.

In 1577, under the idea of Apacuana, the Quiriquires attacked the Spanish encomenderos Garci-González and Francisco Infante as they traversed their territory. In the conquest era of the 15th century, the comenderos were the holders of a grant awarded by the Spanish Crown called encomienda, which gave them the monopoly on the labor of particular groups of Indigenous peoples. The badly wounded Garci-González managed to carry the also injured Francisco Infante on his shoulders and reach Caracas, causing the outrage of the mayors and residents of the town. In response, they sent a force of 50 Spaniards and some Teques, led by the prominent Caracas neighbor Sancho García, to the territory of the Quiriquires in order to punish them.

Upon entering the territory of the Quiriquires, García's mission was constantly attacked by ambushes from warriors who guarded the roads, although they managed to eventually reach the settlement where Garci-González and Francisco Infante had been attacked. Finding the settlement empty, Garcia burned it down, as well as all the others he encountered on the valley. Meanwhile, the natives organized themselves and planned a surprise attack on the military unit. However, the Spaniards became aware of the plan after finding an Indigenous man and torturing him to extract a confession. The unit headed to the place where the natives would gather before the attack, where they found some caciques—among them Acuareyapa—with around 500 warriors waiting for more to arrive. During the battle, the natives were scattered or killed, while others were taken prisoner, among them Apacuana. Recounting the capture and subsequent death of Apacuana, Oviedo y Baños wrote:

Sancho García, exhausted from this assault, gathered with his men at the quebrada, where among several prisoners captured that night, one was immediately recognized as Apacuana, Cacique Guásema's mother. She had been the primary instigator of the uprising, and as a result of her efficacious counsel the Indians had conceived their daring treachery. As punishment, Sancho García ordered her to be hanged and left hanging for all to see, so that her cadaver would move the other Indians to horror. This action brought complete pacification of that rebellious tribe, as the natives, in terror at Apacuana's torture, and broken by the loss of more than two hundred warriors, at first retired to the sierras on the other side of the Tuy but soon returned to solicit peace.

== Aftermath ==
Despite the supposed peace that followed the violent execution of Apacuana, the Quiriquires continued to offer resistance to the Spanish in the following years. According to Fray Pedro Simón, they abandoned their lands around the 1580s, relocating to the south of Lake Maracaibo. From then on, the lake could not be navigated without an escort of soldiers. In 1599, the Quiriquires attacked captain Domingo Lizona in Lake Maracaibo, stealing their merchandise and killing the ship's crew. The following year, on July 22, 1600, the group famously assaulted the Spanish settlement of San Antonio de Gibraltar with a force of 500 men and 140 canoes, looting it and setting fire to all its houses.

== Legacy ==
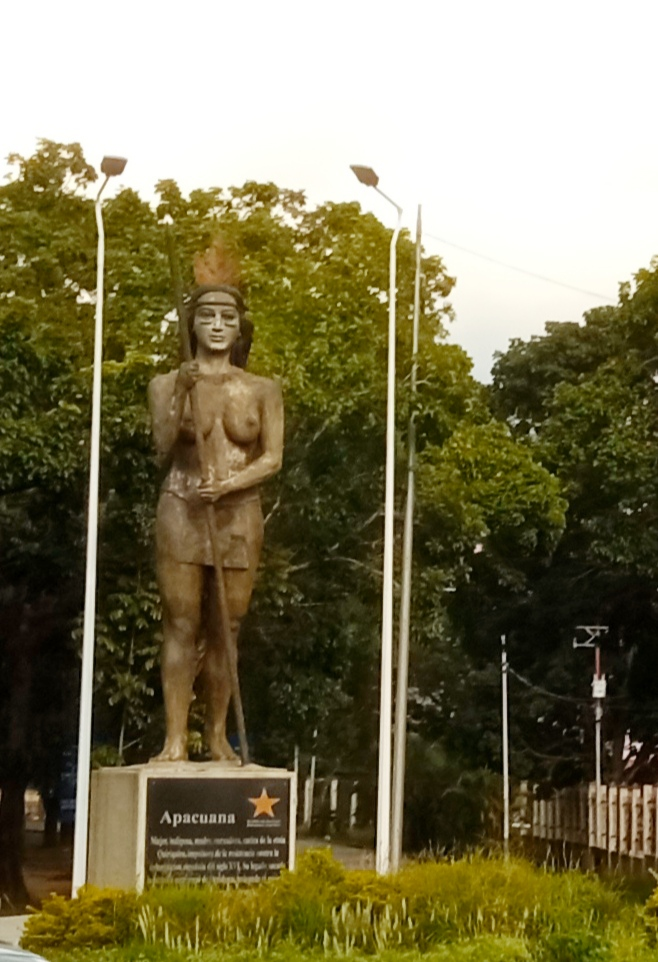
The statue of Apacuana on the Valle-Coche highway, entering the city of Caracas.

Writer Luis Manuel Urbaneja Achelpohl tells the story of Apacuana in his short story "Los abuelos", first published in 1909. She is also the subject of playwright César Rengifo's work Apacuana y Cuaricurián, a so-called "dramatic poem" that premiered in 1975. Rengifo created a fictitious son for Apacuana named Cuaricurán, an artist that refuses to join the war. Since 2015, the Compañía Nacional de Teatro (CNT; English: National Theater Company) of Venezuela gives an annual playwright award named after the Indigenous leader.

On March 8, 2017—on the occasion of International Women's Day—the national government transferred the symbolic remains of Apacuana, along with those of the African slaves Hipólita and Matea, to the National Pantheon of Venezuela, where the main figures of the country's history rest.

In December 2018, the government of Caracas placed a seven-meter statue of Apacuana on the Valle-Coche highway, the entrance to the capital from the center and west of the country, replacing that of the León de Caracas, a standing lion symbolizing the founding of the city. The plaque on the monument states that Apacuana's "legacy shakes the patriarchal history of the West, fueling the spirit of rebellion in all our generations."

The role of women during the Indigenous resistance to Spanish colonization is a subject largely ignored by Venezuelan historians, and Apacuana is one of the few known figures along with Urimare. Thus, her name is often invoked by researchers focused on the country's women's history. On the occasion of the new monument, historian Iraida Vargas Arenas reflected on the historiographic treatment of Apacuana's figure:

The deed of Apacuana teaches us that for almost 5 centuries, (...) women continue to play leading roles in the history of Venezuela. (...) Until now, traditional Venezuelan historiography has used the same androcentric discourse that has served to hide the heroic deed of Apacuana for centuries. Hiding women's actions in history is a byproduct of a history written by men; we can say that by hiding the participation of women, an attempt was made to deny the historicity of their struggles. For this reason, many of these struggles were excluded from the historical memories that our peoples possess, since they are male memories, full of male characters and male actions.

== See also ==
- India Juliana
- Indigenous peoples in Venezuela
- List of people who were executed
- List of uprisings led by women
- List of women who led a revolt or rebellion
- Women's history
- Women in Venezuela

== Bibliography ==
- Biord Castillo, Horacio (2001). Los aborígenes de la región centro-norte de Venezuela, (1550-1600): una ponderación etnográfica de la obra de José Oviedo y Baños (in Spanish). Caracas: Universidad Católica Andrés Bello. ISBN 978-980-244-274-4 – via Google Books.
- MacPherson, Telasco A. (1891). Diccionario histórico, geográfico, estadistico y biográfico del Estado Miranda (República de Venezuela) (in Spanish). Caracas: El Correo de Caracas. OCLC 253754667 – via Google Books.
- Oviedo y Baños, José (1987) [1723]. The Conquest and Settlement of Venezuela [Historia de la conquista y poblacion de la provincia de Venezuela]. Translated by Johnson Varner, Jeannette. University of California Press. ISBN 978-052-005-851-4 – via Google Books.
- Oviedo y Baños, José (2004) [1723]. Martínesz, Tomás Eloy (ed.). Historia de la conquista y población de la Provincia de Venezuela (PDF) (in Spanish) (2nd ed.). Caracas: Biblioteca Ayacucho. ISBN 980-276-376-4 – via Biblioteca Virtual Universal.
