= National Pantheon of Venezuela =

Mausoleum of Venezuelan national heroes

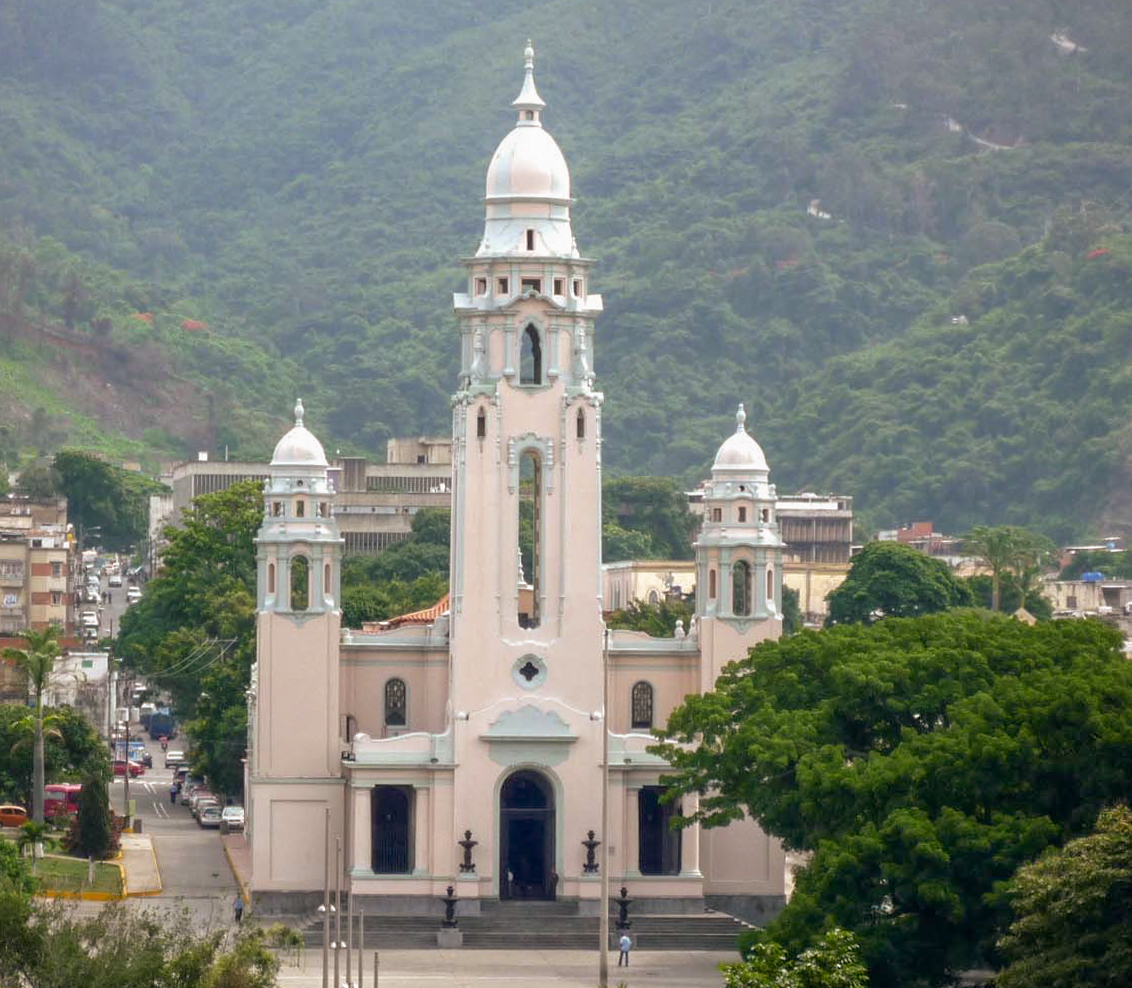
- National Pantheon of Venezuela
- Interactive map of National Pantheon of Venezuela

Details
- Established: 27 March 1874
- Location: Caracas
- Country: Venezuela
- Coordinates: 10°30′46″N 66°54′45″W
- Type: Public
- Owned by: Venezuelan government

The National Pantheon of Venezuela (Panteón Nacional de Venezuela) is a final resting place for national heroes. The Pantheon (Latin Pantheon, from Greek Pantheon, meaning "Temple of all the Gods") was created in the 1870s on the site of the ruined Santísima Trinidad church from 1744 on the northern edge of the old town of Caracas, Venezuela.

The entire central nave is dedicated to Simón Bolívar, with the altar's place taken by the hero's bronze sarcophagus, while lesser luminaries are relegated to the aisles. The national pantheon's vault is covered with 1930s paintings depicting scenes from Bolívar's life, and the huge crystal chandelier glittering overhead was installed in 1883 on the centennial of his birth. The Pantheon was reopened in 2013 after a 3-year-long process of expansion and restoration.

== Gallery ==
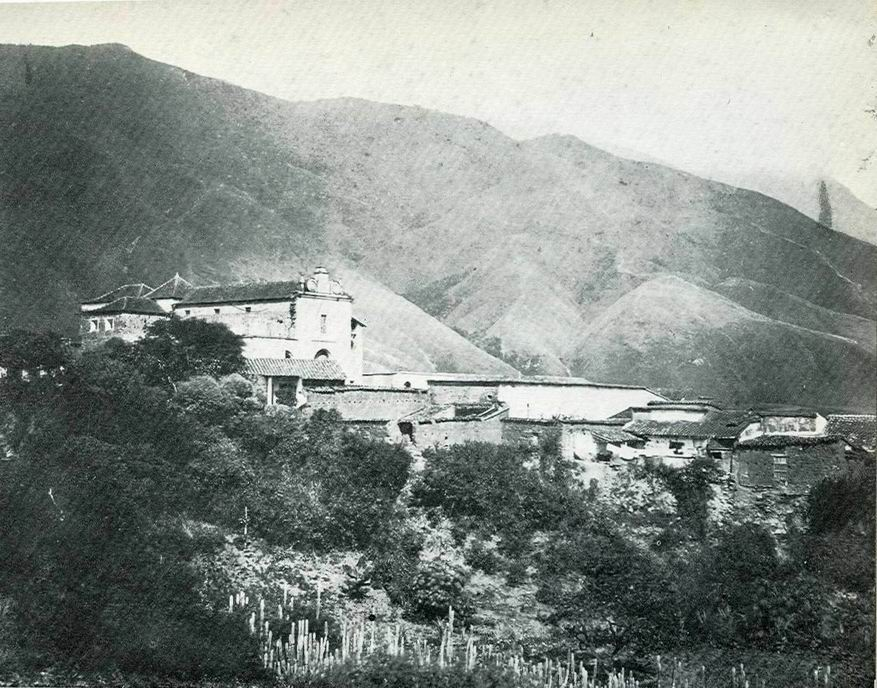
Santísima Trinidad Church, 1874

Old facade of the National Pantheon, 1912

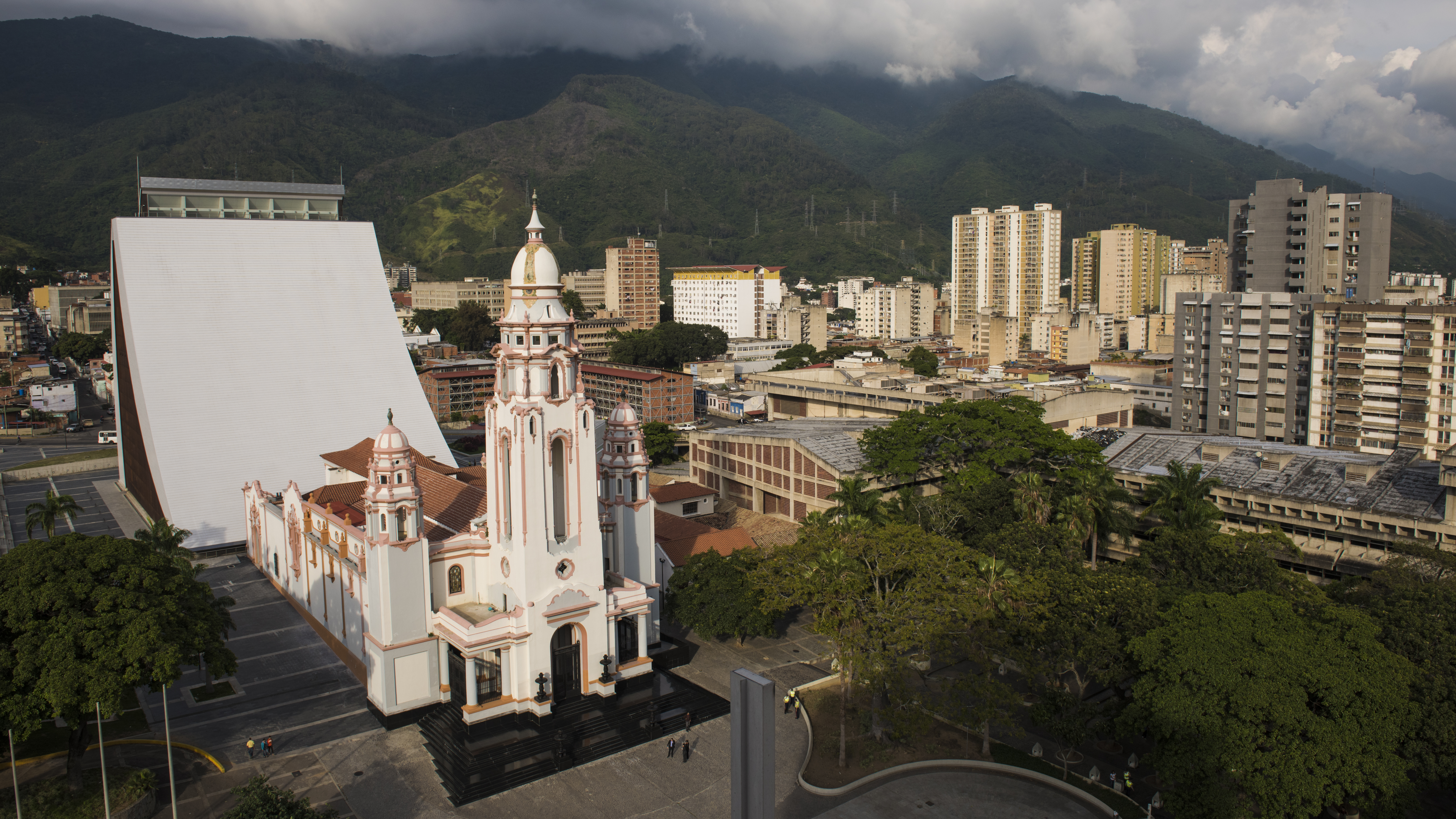
Panteón Nacional de Venezuela

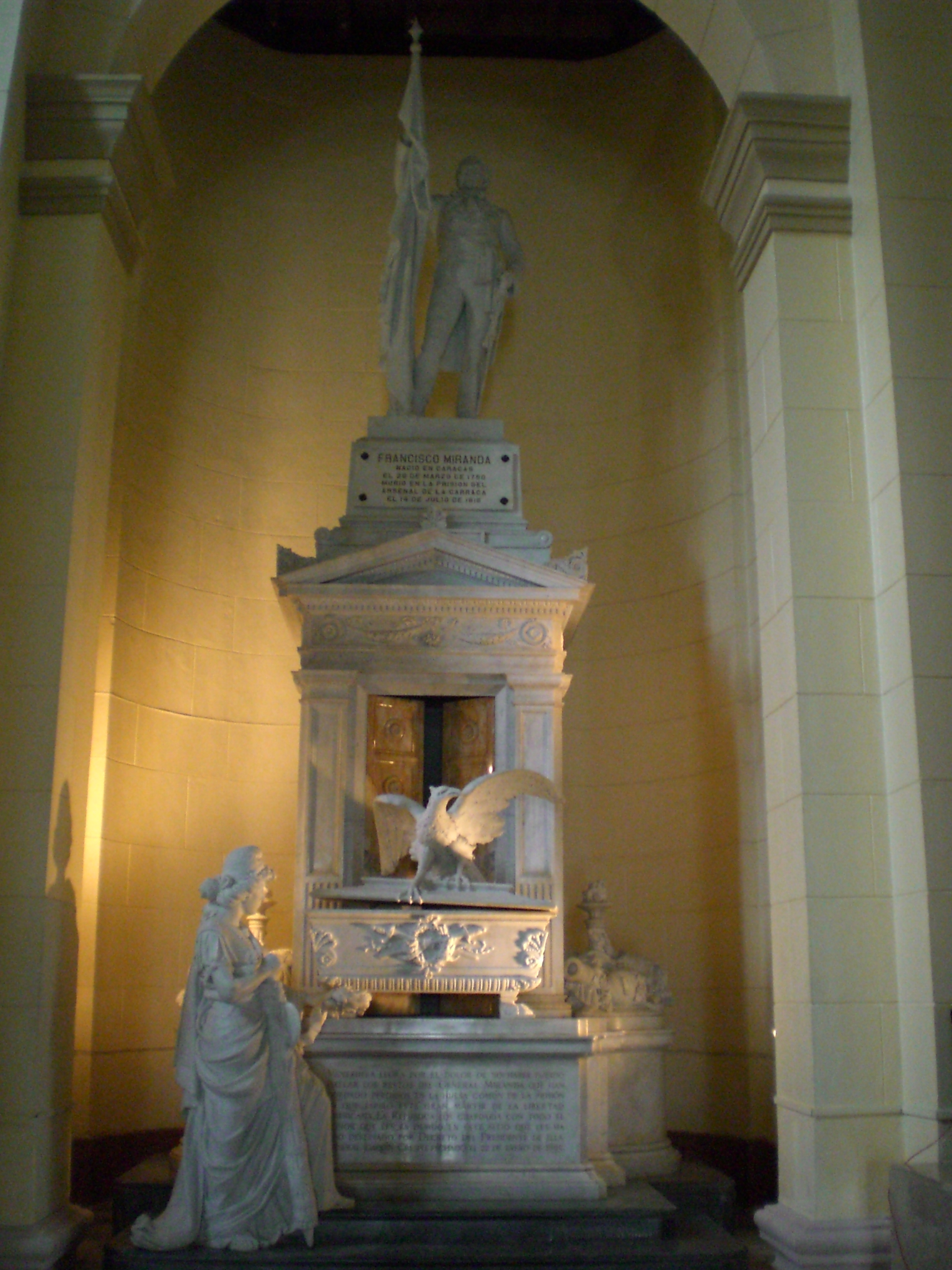
Cenotaph of Francisco de Miranda

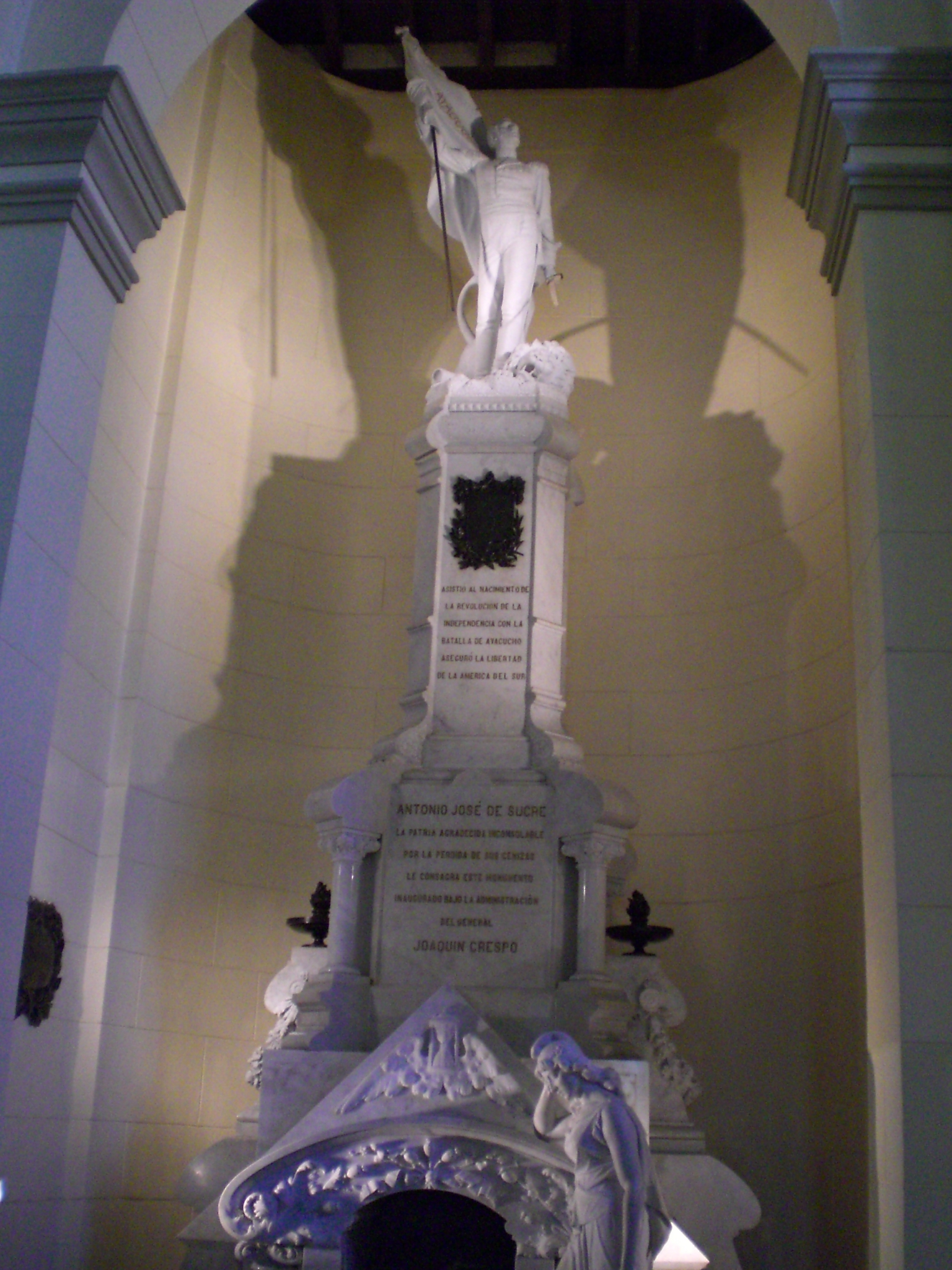
Cenotaph of Antonio José de Sucre

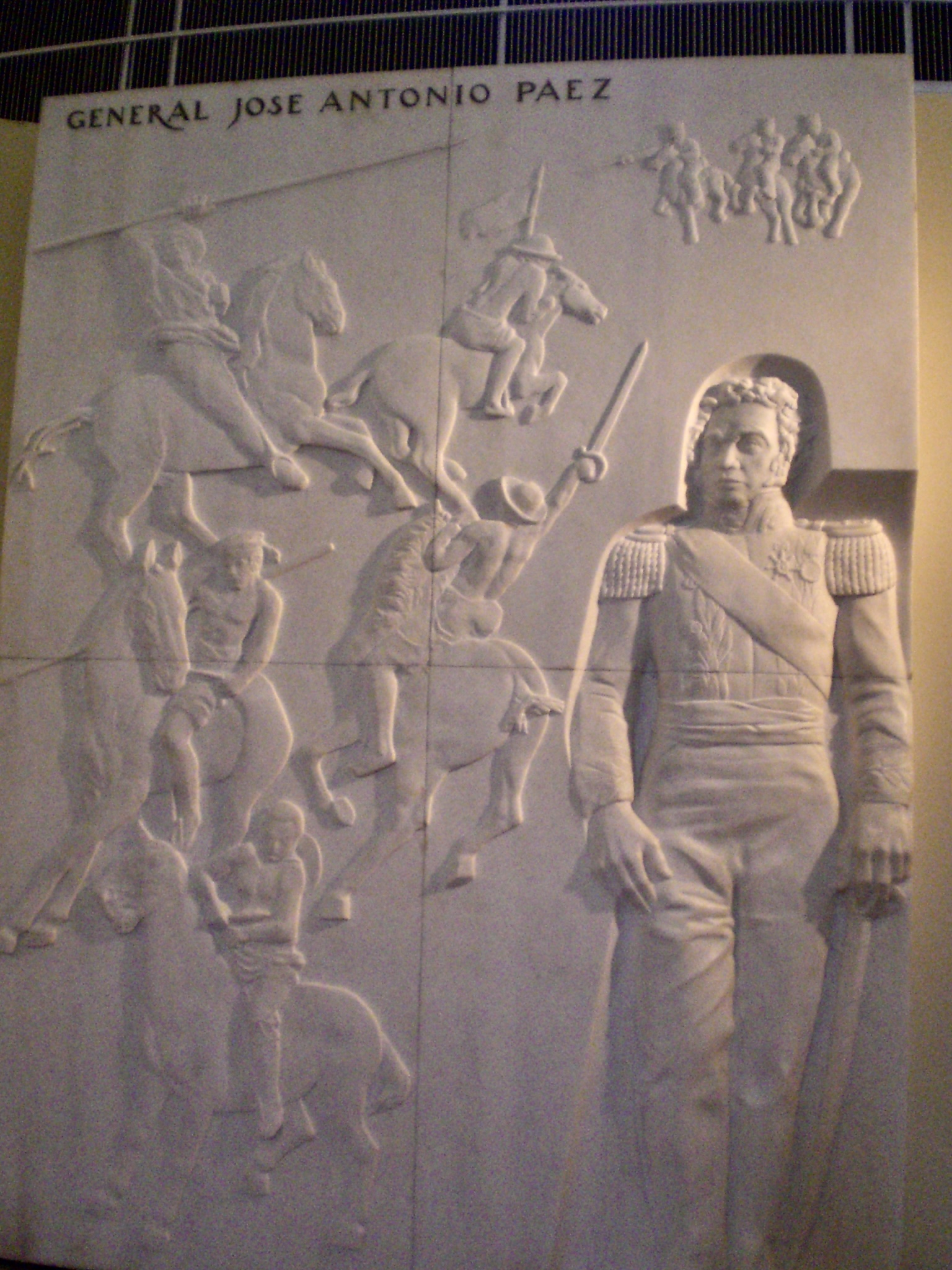
Monument to José Antonio Páez

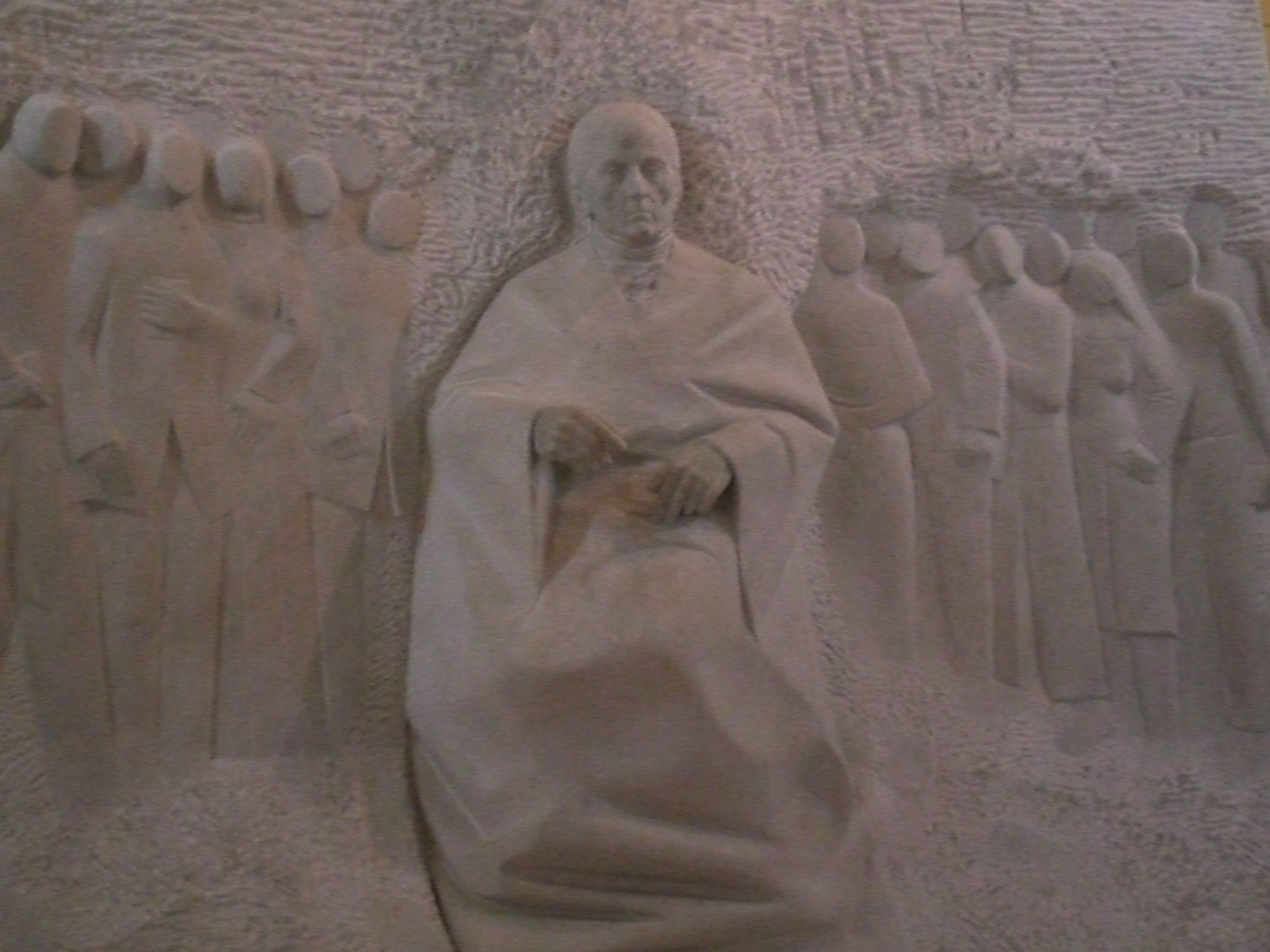
Cenotaph of Andrés Bello

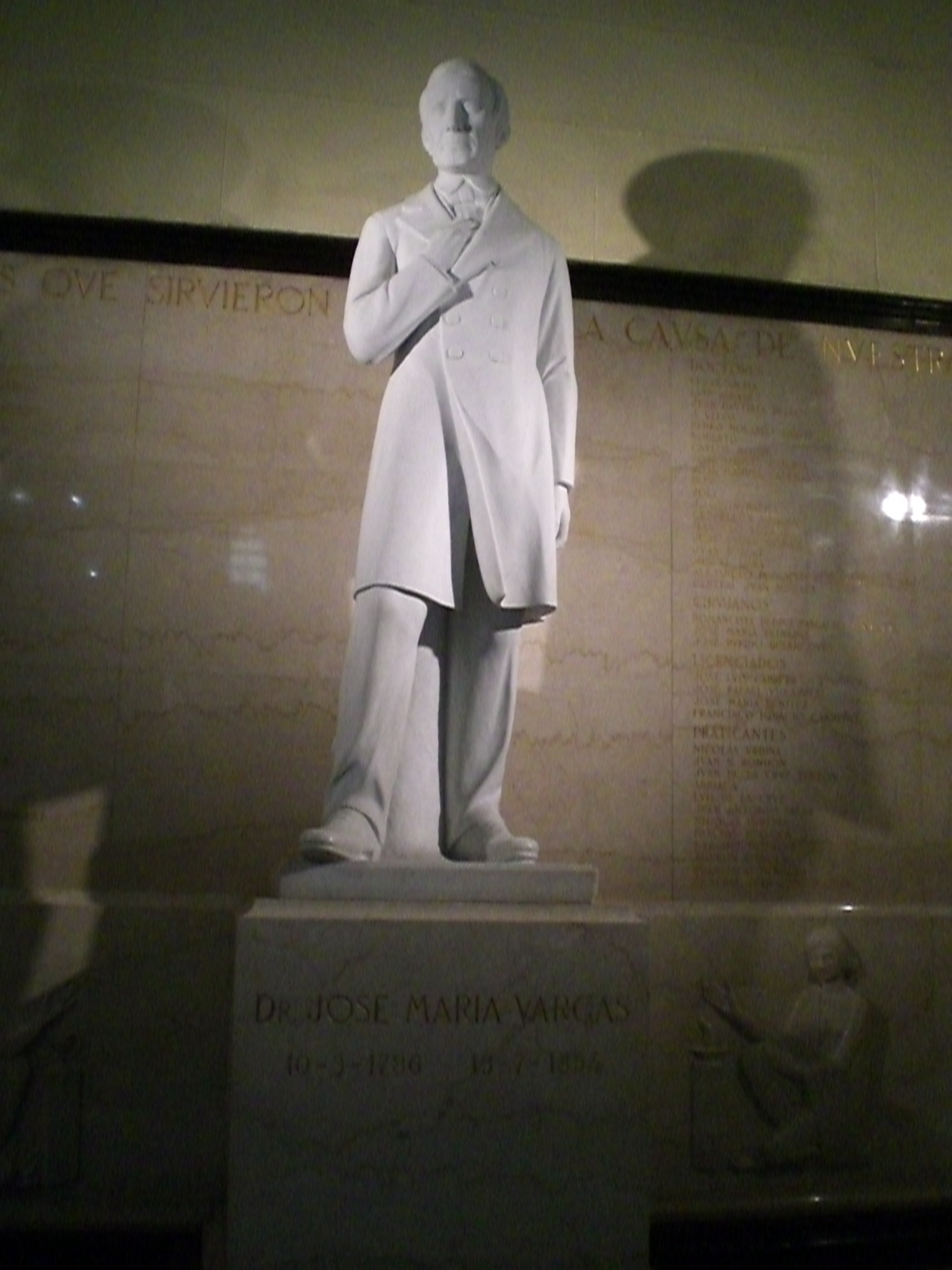
Monument to José María Vargas

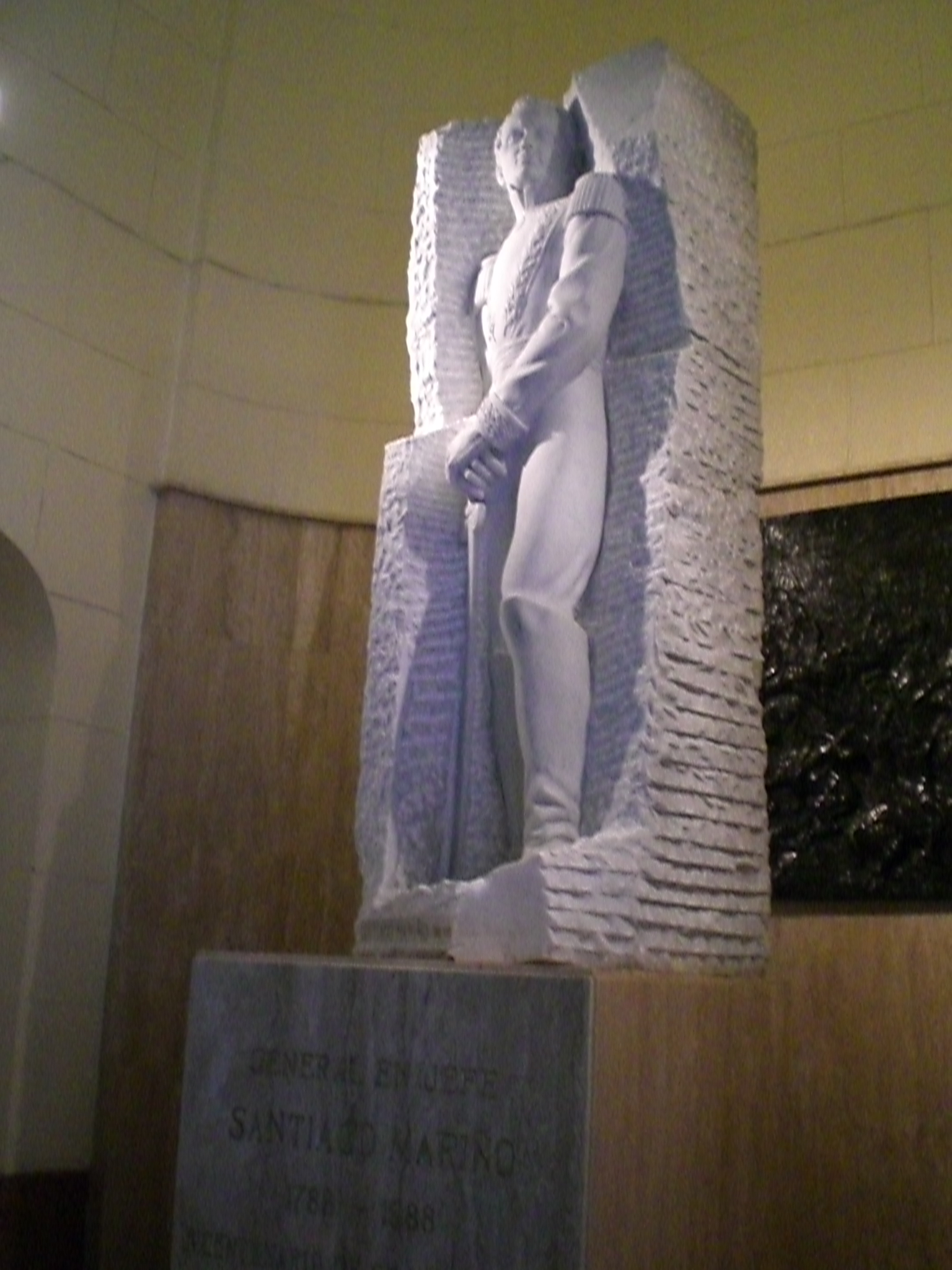
Monument to Santiago Mariño

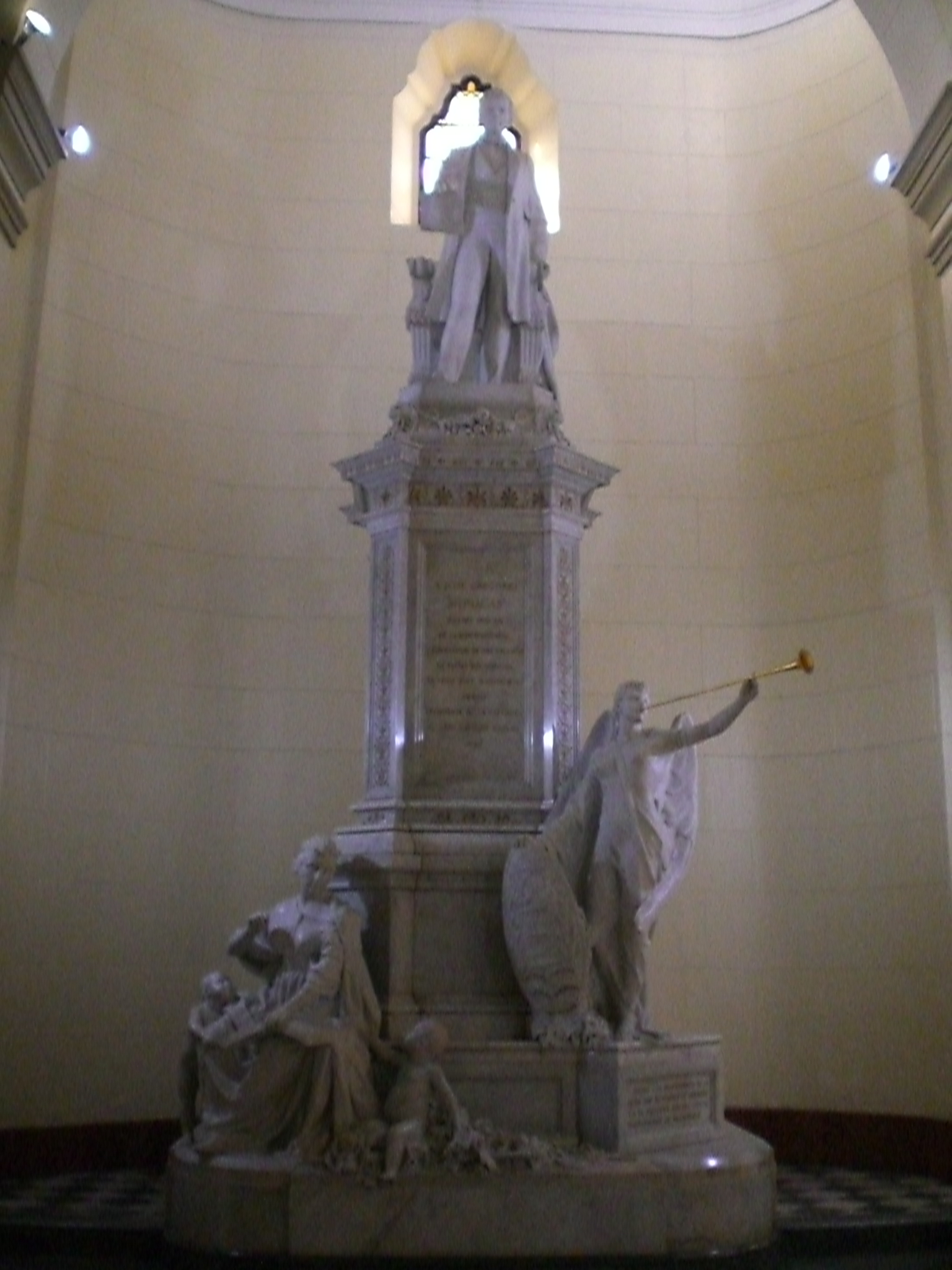
Monument to José Gregorio Monagas

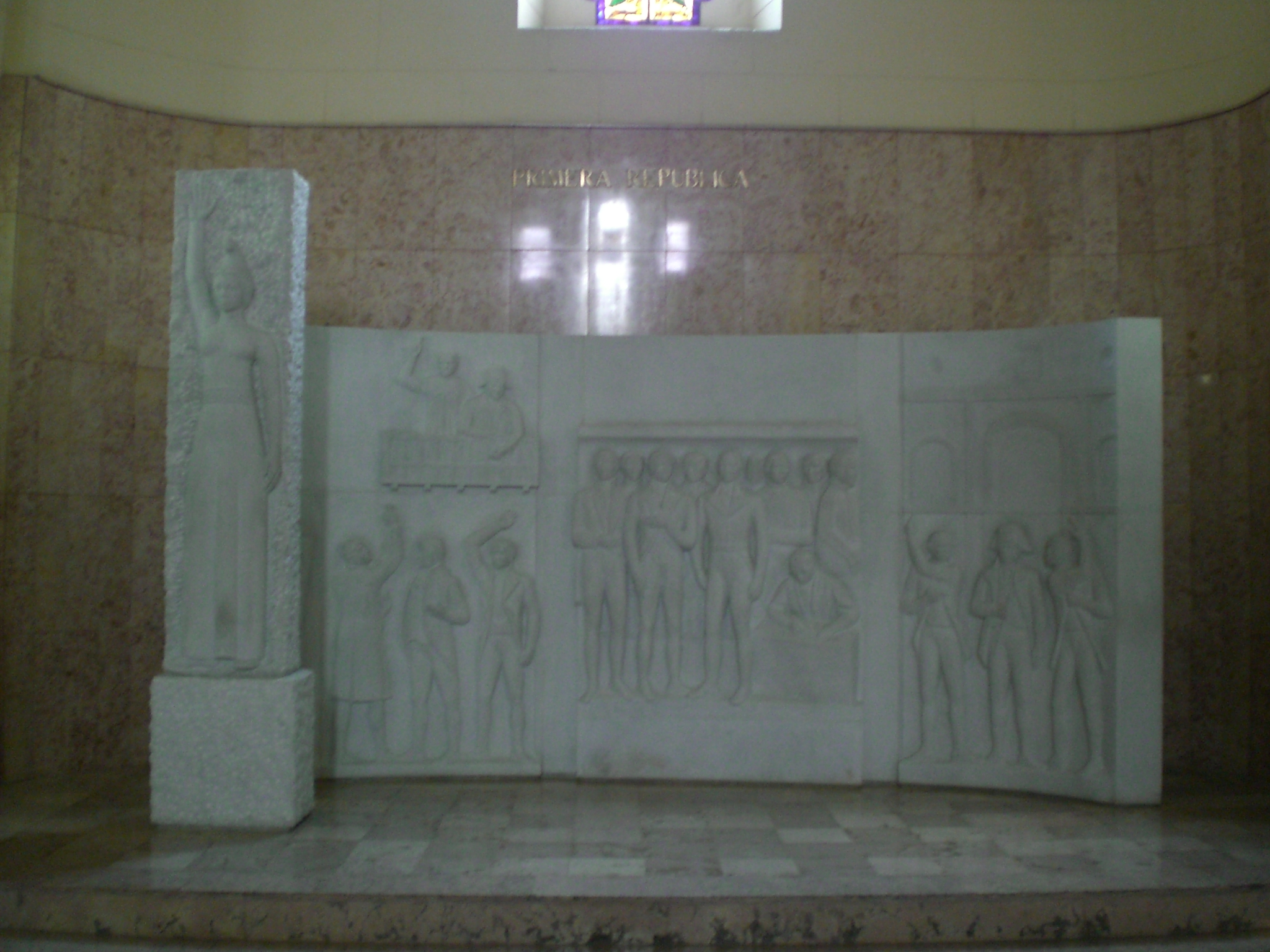
First Republic Monument

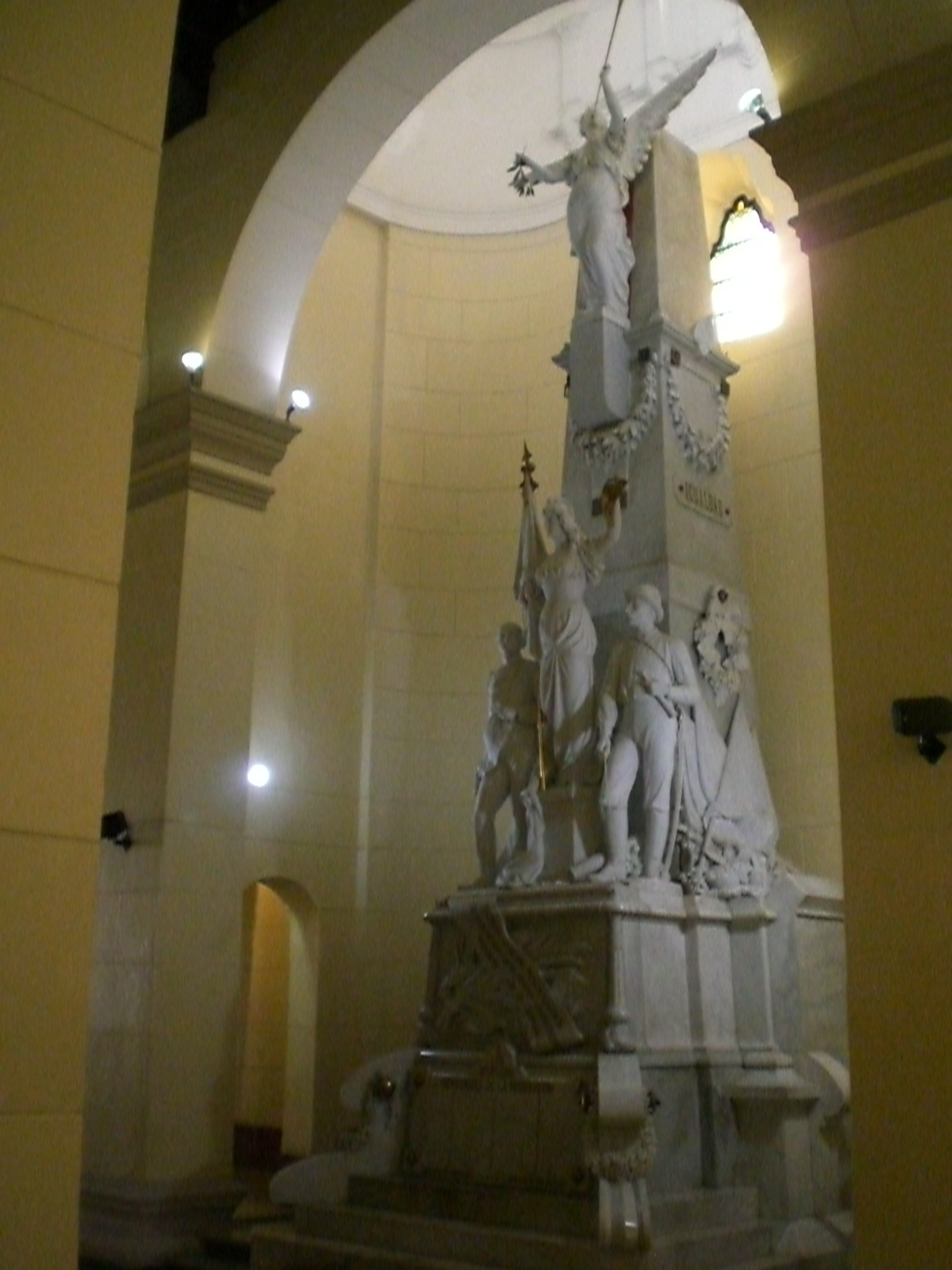
Federation's Monument

== List of people who are buried at the Pantheon ==
- Cecilio Acosta. Writer, journalist and humanist. (5 July 1937).
- José Ángel de Álamo. Doctor, leader of the Independence movement. (9 May 1876).
- Francisco de Paula Alcántara. General in the War of Independence. (6 June 1876).
- Demetrio Alfaro. Officer in the War of Independence. (28 May 1876).
- Lisandro Alvarado. Doctor. (14 May 1980).
- Apacuana. Indigenous rebel. (8 March 2017).
- Hipólita Bolívar. Wet nurse. (8 March 2017).
- Matea Bolívar. Nurse of the Bolívar family. (8 March 2017).
- Raimundo Andueza. Lawyer, soldier and politician, father of President Raimundo Andueza Palacio. (2 September 1881).
- Francisco Aranda. Politician. (18 May 1898).
- Juan Bautista Arismendi. Officer in the War of Independence. (29 January 1877).
- Jesús María Aristeguieta. Military officer and politician in the War of Independence. (18 March 1890).
- Carlos Arvelo. Doctor and politician. (16 December 1942).
- Rafael Arvelo. Journalist. (12 July 1877).
- Francisco de Paula Avendaño. Officer in the War of Independence. (16 March 1966).
- Rafael María Baralt. Writer and historian; ambassador to Spain. (23 November 1982).
- José Miguel Barceló. Military of the Federal War. (14 May 1878).
- Pedro Bárcenas. Doctor and officer in the War of Independence. (5 November 1877).
- Víctor Barret de Nazarís. Military and politician of the Federal War. (25 August 1896).
- Renato Beluche. Sailor in the Venezuelan Navy during the War of Independence. (22 July 1963).
- José Francisco Bermúdez. Officer in the War of Independence. (24 October 1877).
- Pedro Bermúdez Cousín. Lawyer, soldier and politician. (30 December 1875).
- Andrés Eloy Blanco. Poet and politician. (2 July 1981).
- José Félix Blanco. Priest. (3 July 1896).
- Manuel Blanco. Sailor who fought with both San Martín and Simón Bolívar. (15 April 1876).
- Rufino Blanco Fombona. Writer and politician. (23 June 1975).
- Simón Bolívar. Liberator of Bolivia, Colombia, Ecuador, Peru, Panama and Venezuela. (28 October 1876).
- Justo Bricéño. Officer in the War of Independence. (21 May 1876).
- Mario Briceño Iragorry. Historian, writer and diplomat. (6 March 1991).
- Domingo Briceño y Briceño. Lawyer, journalist and writer. (6 May 1876).
- Luis Brión. Admiral of the Venezuelan Navy in the Independence War. (10 April 1882).
- Blas Bruzual. Military, politician and journalist. (16 August 1889).
- Manuel Ezequiel Bruzual. Military and politician. (13 November 1872).
- Lorenzo Bustillos. Officer in the War of Independence. (17 February 1877).
- Luisa Cáceres de Arismendi. Patriot and Heroine of the Venezuelan War of Independence. (14 August 1876).
- Josefa Venancio de la Encarnación Camejo. Heroine in the War of Independence.
- Francisco Carabaño Aponte. Officer in the War of Independence. (18 May 1876).
- Teresa Carreño. Pianist and composer. (9 December 1977).
- José de la Cruz Carrillo. Officer in the War of Independence. (15 December 1971).
- Carlos Luis Castelli. Officer in the War of Independence. (11 May 1876).
- Juan Francisco del Castillo. Lawyer, military and politician. (2 July 1893).
- Pedro Camejo. Known by his nickname Negro Primero, hero of the War of Independence and fought with Simón Bolívar till his untimely death in the Battle of Carabobo. (24 June 2015)
- Cipriano Castro. Military and President of Venezuela. (6 December 2002).
- Manuel Cedeño. Officer in the War of Independence. (16 December 1942).
- Lino de Clemente. Official of the Venezuelan navy. (21 July 1961).
- Agostino Codazzi. Military, scientist, geographer and cartographer.(16 December 1942).
- Juan Fermín Colmenares. Military and politician at the Federal War. (20 August 1881).
- Juan José Conde. Officer in the War of Independence. (19 May 1876).
- José María Delgado Correa. (20 May 1876).
- Manuel María Echeandía. (18 April 1876).
- Juan Crisóstomo Falcón. Soldier, politician, and President of Venezuela. (1 May 1874).
- León de Febres Cordero. Officer in the War of Independence. (16 December 1942).
- Carmelo Fernández. Officer in the War of Independence. (18 August 1983).
- Fernando Figueredo. Officer in the War of Independence. (29 June 1937).
- Alejo Fortique. Politician and diplomat. (30 April 1876).
- Argimiro Gabaldon. Politician, poet, painter and guerrillero.(15 July 2017).
- Rómulo Gallegos. Writer and politician, President of Venezuela. (3 May 1994).
- Juan Garcés. Soldier in the war of Independence. (26 November 1934).
- José María García. Navy officer in the War of Independence. (15 August 1896).
- Valentín García. Officer in the War of Independence. (27 April 1961).
- Miguel Gil. Soldier in the War of Independence. (5 August 1876).
- Francisco Esteban Gómez. Officer in the War of Independence. (20 August 1881).
- José de Jesús González. Military leader of the Federal War. (22 April 1897).
- Tomás Green. (24 August 1876).
- Guaicaipuro. Indigenous chief. (9 December 2001).
- Juan Bautista Guerra Carrillo.
- Manuel María Guevara. (10 August 1877).
- Antonio Leocadio Guzmán. Politician and journalist. (18 November 1884).
- Antonio Guzmán Blanco. Military, lawyer and President of Venezuela. (1999).
- Tomás de Heres. Officer in the War of Independence. (16 December 1942).
- Francisco Hurtado. (26 May 1876).
- Andrés Ibarra. Officer in the War of Independence. (24 August 1875).
- Diego Ibarra. Officer in the War of Independence. (20 October 1876).
- Francisco de Ibarra. Priest. (9 November 1880).
- Juan Domingo del Sacramento Infante. Bricklayer, constructor of the Santísima Trinidad Church (Current National Pantheon). (13 December 1780).
- Tomás Lander. Journalist, farmer, politician, and propagator of liberal thought. President of Venezuela (5 April 1884).
- José Prudencio Lanz. (21 April 1876).
- Jacinto Lara. Officer in the War of Independence. (24 July 1911).
- Francisco Lazo Martí. Doctor and poet. (27 October 1983).
- Andrés Olimpo Level. Magistrate, lawyer, politician and journalist. Active in the War of Independence. (28 November 1876).
- Francisco Linares Alcántara. Soldier and politician, President of Venezuela. (4 December 1878).
- Enrique Luzón. German-born and originally named Heinrich von Lützow Officer in the War of Independence. (12 December 1877).
- José Tomás Machado. Official of the Venezuelan Navy. (16 December 1942).
- Vicente Marcano. Engineer, chemist and geologist. (10 July 1991).
- Santiago Mariño. Officer in the War of Independence. (1 January 1877).
- Zoilo Medrano. Farmer leader of the Federal War. (22 April 1897).
- Ramón Ignacio Méndez de la Barta. Priest, lawyer and politician during the Independence War.(16 December 1942).
- Arturo Michelena. Painter. (29 July 1948).
- Guillermo Michelena Salías. Doctor, university professor, and science writer. (10 November 1891).
- Carlos Minchin. Officer in the War of Independence. (4 June 1879).
- Francisco de Miranda. Venezuelan revolutionary before Bolívar, participant in the American Revolution and the French Revolution.
- José Gregorio Monagas. General in the War of Independence, President of Venezuela, ordered the end of slavery in an 1854 presidential decree. (13 November 1872).
- José Tadeo Monagas. Military leader, President of Venezuela. (17 May 1877).
- Mariano Montilla. Officer in the War of Independence. (3 July 1896).
- Juan de Dios Monzón. Doctor, soldier and politician. (20 April 1876).
- José Trinidad Morán. Writer and officer in the War of Independence. (3 December 1954).
- Tomás Muñoz y Ayala. (14 June 1892).
- Pedro Navarro Bolet. (29 January 1878).
- Carlos Núñez. Member of the Patriotic Society during the Independence. (17 February 1877).
- Daniel Florencio O'Leary. Irish officer serving in the Venezuelan and Colombian army during the War of Independence. (10 April 1882).
- Manuel Germán Ojeda Muñiz. (20 December 1875).
- Fabricio Ojeda. Journalist and news reporter who helped bring forth the triumph of the 1958 Venezuelan coup d'état, ending years of military domination in state affairs, later president of Patriotic Council during the democratic transition period. (24 January 2017)
- José Manuel Olivares. Officer in the War of Independence. (14 May 1876).
- José Antonio Páez. General-in-Chief of Venezuelan Independence. First president of Venezuela after it had succeeded from Gran Colombia in 1830. (19 April 1888).
- Miguel Palacio Fajardo. Doctor and lawyer. Officer in the War of Independence. (1876).
- Juan Antonio Paredes Angulo. Officer in the War of Independence. (16 September 1960).
- Francisco Vicente Parejo. Officer in the War of Independence. (18 May 1876).
- Ana Teresa Parra Sanojo. Writer. (7 November 1989).
- Jesús María Paúl. (11 February 1877).
- Miguel Peña. Lawyer and politician. (24 July 1911).
- Fernando Peñalver. Signer of the Act of Independence. (3 July 1896).
- Juan Antonio Pérez Bonalde. Poet. (14 February 1946).
- Manuel Piar. General in chief of the army during the Independence War.
- Gabriel Picón González. Officer in the War of Independence. (23 June 1975).
- Judas Tadeo Piñango. Officer in the War of Independence. (16 December 1942).
- Simón Planas. Politician. (26 August 1877).
- José Ignacio Pulido del Pumar. Officer in the War of Independence. (15 January 1881).
- José Luis Ramos. Humanist, founder of the Literary journalism. (16 August 1889).
- Rafael Rangel. Scientist who studied tropical diseases. (20 August 1977).
- Luis Razetti. Doctor and surgeon. (23 June 1982).
- Cesar Rengifo. Painter, poet, writer. (10 May 2016).
- José Rafael Revenga. Lawyer. (22 December 1969).
- Armando Reveron. Painter. (10 May 2016).
- Pedro Rodríguez. (12 December 1879).
- Simón Rodríguez. Bolívar's teacher. (28 February 1954).
- Francisco Rodríguez del Toro. Signer of the Act of Independence and first Commander in Chief of Venezuela's Independence Army (9 May 1851).
- Donato Rodríguez Silva. Military and politician of the Federal War. (22 April 1897).
- Arístides Rojas. Naturalist. (22 September 1983).
- Cristóbal Rojas. Painter. (27 December 1958).
- Pedro Manuel Rojas Mercado. Military leader of the Federal War. (10 August 1876).
- Juan José Rondón. Officer in the War of Independence. (25 August 1896).
- Manuela Sáenz. Heroine in the Latin American wars of independence, helped in the struggle for Peruvian independence and for women's rights and was responsible for saving Simón Bolívar from an assassination attempt in 1828. (5 July 2010)
- Bartolomé Salom. Officer in the War of Independence. (5 July 1909).
- Tomás José Sanabria y Meleán. Lawyer and politician. (1 January 1896).
- Luis Sanojo. Lawyer and politician. (22 June 1978).
- José Laurencio Silva. Officer in the War of Independence. (16 December 1942).
- Juan Antonio Sotillo. Officer in the War of Independence. (9 January 1878).
- Carlos Soublette. Officer in the War of Independence, President of Venezuela. (7 February 1970).
- Fermín Toro. Politician, writer and diplomat. (23 April 1876).
- Pedro León Torres. Officer in the War of Independence. (16 August 1889).
- Martín Tovar y Tovar. Painter. (22 September 1983).
- José Vicente de Unda. Priest. (16 December 1942).
- Diego Bautista Urbaneja. Lawyer and colonel. (22 October 1876).
- Adolfo Urdaneta. Son of Rafael Urdaneta. (24 November 1876)
- Rafael Urdaneta. General Officer of the War of Independence. (16 May 1876).
- Wenceslao Urrutia. Lawyer and politician. (20 April 1876).
- Juan Uslar. German-born and originally named Johan Von Usler, in 1819 he brought more than 300 soldiers to aid the Venezuelans in their fight for independence. (16 December 1942).
- José María Vargas. Doctor and surgeon, President of Venezuela. (27 April 1877).
- Miguel Antonio Vásquez. Officer in the War of Independence. (c. 1920).
- José Joaquín Veroes. Colonel in the War of Independence. (16 December 1942).
- Francisco Javier Yánez. (1876).
- José Ramón Yépez. Official of the Venezuelan Navy. (22 August 1949).
- Ezequiel Zamora. Military leader of the Federal War. (13 November 1872)
- Miguel Zárraga. Officer in the War of Independence. (10 May 1876).
- Cristóbal Mendoza. First President of Venezuela after the country gained independence from Spain. (23 June 2024).

The following personalities in the preceding list are not buried in the Pantheon because their remains have not been found, but it has been decreed by the Venezuelan authorities they should be:

- Francisco de Miranda. First leader of the Venezuelan Independence, participant at the American Revolutionary War and the French Revolution.
- Josefa Camejo. Heroine of the Independence War.
- Guaicaipuro. Indigenous chief that fought against the Spaniards.
- Manuel Piar. General in chief of the army during the Independence War.

The following person is not buried in the Pantheon but an empty tomb is kept there, next to Simon Bolivar's in the hopes that his remains will return to his homeland:

- Antonio José de Sucre. Hero of the South American Independence War, second President of Bolivia

=== Monuments ===
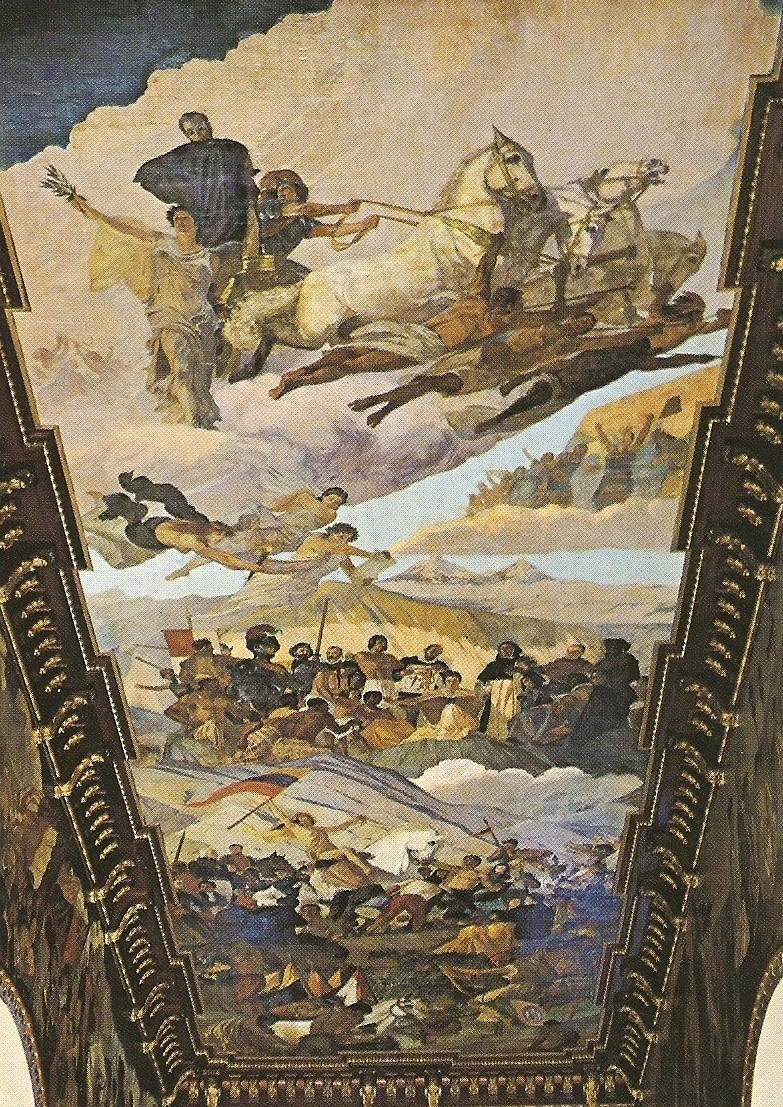
Bolívar´s Apotheosis by Tito Salas

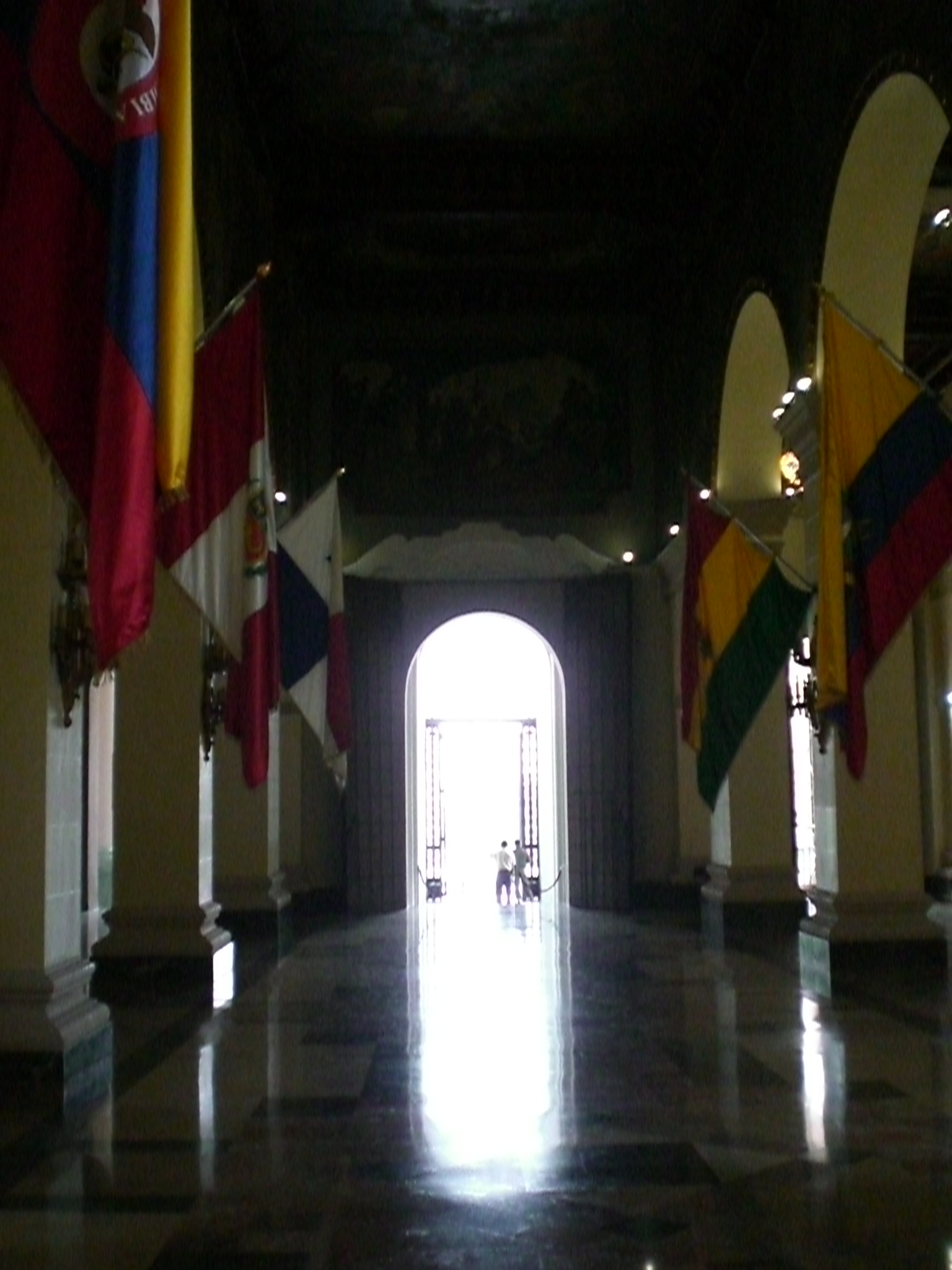
Entrance of the National Pantheon

Central Nave

- Monument to Simón Bolívar by Pietro Tenerani.

Right Nave

- Monument to the First Republic by Hugo Daini.
- Monument to José Gregorio Monagas by Julio Roversi.
- Monumento to the Federation by Juan Bautista Sales Ferré.

Left Nave

- Monument to José Antonio Páez by José Pizzo.
- Monument to Rafael Urdaneta by Pietro Ceccarelli.
- Monument to José María Vargas by Franco Bianchinni.
- Monument to Santiago Mariño by Manuel de la Fuente.

=== Cenotaphs ===
- Cenotaph in honor of Francisco de Miranda by Julio Roversi.
- Cenotaph in honor of Antonio José de Sucre by Juan Bautista Sales Ferré.
- Cenotaph in honor of Andrés Bello by Manuel de la Fuente.

=== Works of Tito Salas ===
- Alegoría de la libertad de los esclavos.
- Apoteosis del Libertador. (1942)
- Bolívar en el Chimborazo.
- Bolívar y Humboldt en París.
- El ascenso al Cerro de Potosí el 26 de octubre de 1825.
- El tiempo graba el nombre de Bolívar para la posteridad.
- Entrada triunfal de Bolívar a Caracas después de la Batalla de Carabobo en 1821. (1935)
- Coat of arms of the City of Caracas (1942)
- Escudo de la familia Bolívar. (1942)
- Coat of arms of Venezuela (1942)
- Foundation of Caracas. (1939)
- Inspiración del istmo de Panamá.
- Bolivar's pledge of independence on Sacro Hill.
- La noche de Casacoima.
- La Santísima Trinidad. (1933)
- 1842 Transfer of the remains of the Liberator from La Guaira to Caracas. (1934)
- Unión, Unión.

== See also ==
- Panthéon, Paris
