= Lisandro Alvarado =

Venezuelan medical doctor and naturalist

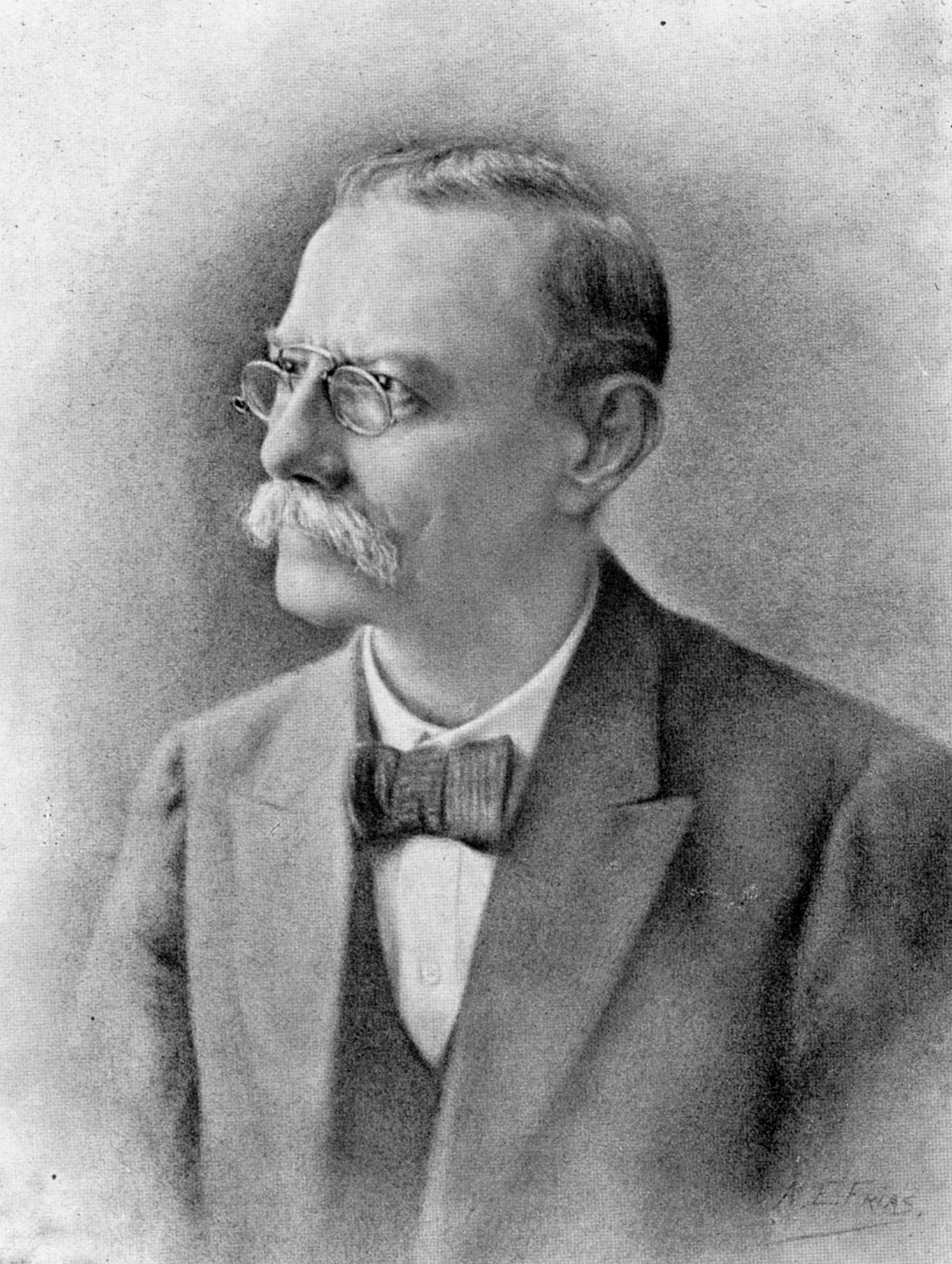

Personal details
- Born: 19 September 1858 El Tocuyo, Venezuela
- Died: 10 April 1929 (aged 70) Valencia, Venezuela

Lisandro Alvarado (September 19, 1858 – April 10, 1929) was a Venezuelan medical doctor, naturalist, historian, ethnologist, and linguist.

== Biography ==
He was born in the city of El Tocuyo, in Morán Municipality (Lara). His parents were Rafael Alvarado and Gracia Benigna Marchena. In the school La Concordia (of El Tocuyo), run by Egidio Montesinos, he received the influence of literary classics and knowledge of Latin, aspects that would be decisive in his intellectual life.

In 1871 he traveled to Trujillo to finish the baccalaureate. Soon, the lack of resources on the part of his family forced him to drop out of school and work as a pharmacist at Barquisimeto. However, in 1878 he moved to Caracas to begin medical studies. During this period he was in direct contact with the intense political life of the moment, characterized by the predominance of Antonio Guzmán Blanco. Intellectually he was able to know the doctrinal framework of positivism, represented in the teachings of Adolf Ernst and Rafael Villavicencio. In this sense, Alvarado was confronted with his religious and traditionalist vision of life with the new scientific ideas of the late nineteenth century. At first, positivism influenced his research in the field of ethnography, history, language, as well as his interest in various ancient and modern cultures. In this period Alvarado shared his scientific knowledge with César Zumeta, Luis López Méndez and José Rafael Revenga, giving information about his first works around 1882.

Despite his first inclination towards the positivist doctrine, contact with Cecilio Acosta, allowed Alvarado to connect to neoclassical tendencies other than positivism. In 1881, through Acosta he was able to meet José Martí in Caracas, who had an important influence on his vision of life and science. In this sense, once he obtained his doctorate in medicine, Alvarado settled in Ospino (Portuguesa).

He traveled the country on donkey, in canoes and on foot, which allowed him to come into direct contact with Venezuelan reality: the landscapes, the vegetation, the wildlife, the customs and popular traditions, the different dialects, including the numerous indigenous people he met and whose language he could study first-hand.

He traveled to Europe as a consul and medical delegate. In 1891 he returned to the province and began the publication of a set of research papers. In this period he wrote several studies: Neurosis of famous men of Venezuela (Neurosis de hombres célebres de Venezuela) (1893) and On the civil wars of the country (Sobre las guerras civiles del país) (1894). He also published a series of works related to linguistics and lexicography, the first being ideas on the evolution of Spanish in Venezuela (Ideas sobre la evolución del español en Venezuela) (1903), followed by Glossary of indigenous voices in Venezuela (Glosario de voces indígenas en Venezuela) (1921), phonetic alterations of Spanish in Venezuela (Alteraciones fonéticas del español en Venezuela) (1922, reworked in 1929) and finally his Glossary of the Spanish bass in Venezuela (Glosario del bajo español en Venezuela) (1929). In 1920 he returned to Caracas to work in the Directorate of Trade Policy (of the Ministry of Foreign Affairs). In recognition of his extensive work in research, he was incorporated as an individual number in the Academy of Medicine (Academia Nacional de Medicina de Venezuela) in 1905, the Venezuelan Academy of Language in 1922 and the National Academy of History of Venezuela in 1923. His complete works in eight volumes began to be published in 1958; however, there is still an unpublished collection of his manuscripts in the custody of the National Academy of History.

He was a grade 30Mason.

Since May 14, 1980 his remains rest in the National Pantheon of Venezuela.
