= Fermín Toro =

Venezuelan diplomat and politician

Fermín del Toro y Blanco
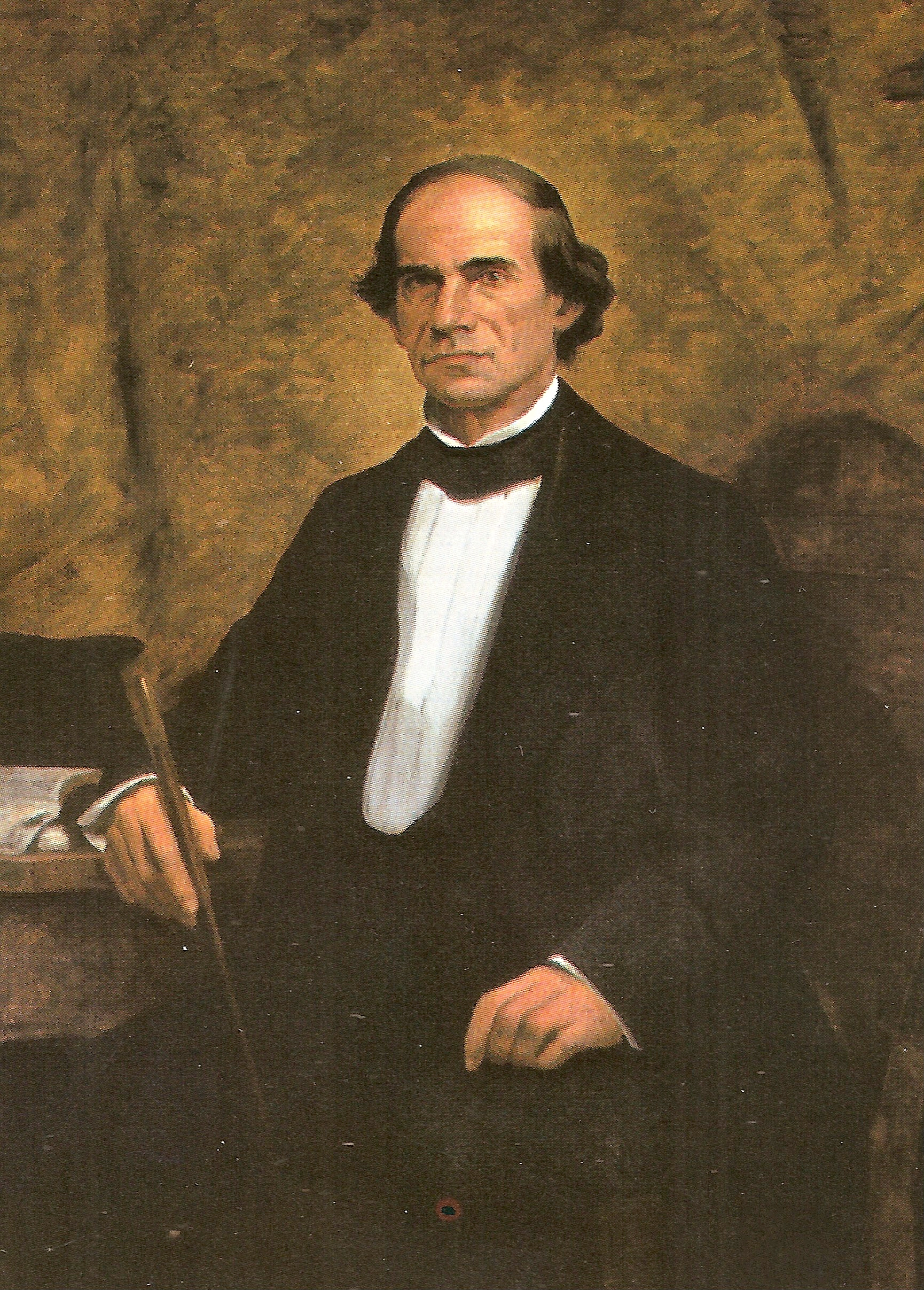
- Portrait by Antonio Herrera Toro

Minister of Foreign Affairs of Venezuela
- In office 14 April 1858 – 17 June 1859
- President: Julián Castro
- Preceded by: Wenceslao Urrutia
- Succeeded by: Miguel Herrera

Personal details
- Born: 14 July 1806 Caracas, Viceroyaly of New Granada
- Died: 23 December 1865 (aged 59) Caracas, Venezuela
- Spouse: María de las Mercedes de Tovar y Rodríguez del Toro
- Profession: Writer, novelist, politician, diplomat
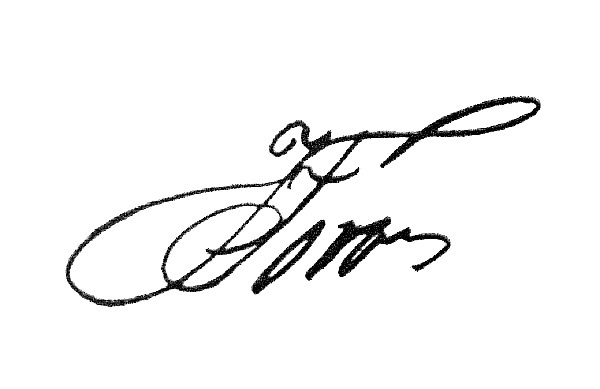
- Signature

Fermín Toro y Blanco (Caracas- El Valle, 14 July 1806 - Caracas, 23 December 1865) was a Venezuelan humanist, politician, diplomat and author.

== Biography ==
Within his public life he was Minister of Foreign Affairs, twice Minister of Finance (in 1847 and in 1858), President of the National Convention of 1858 in charge of elaborating a new Constitution, President of the Chamber of Deputies, Plenipotentiary Minister to the United Kingdom, Spain, France and Colombia, and Presidential candidate in two occasions. Together with the Government of the Spanish Queen Isabel II he signed in 1846 the Ratification of the Treaty of Recognition of Venezuela's Independence by Spain, the former colonial metropolis. Subsequently, a ball on his honour was offered by the Queen. He also negotiated border delimitations with Colombia and relevant political issues with the United States, European capitals, and Brazil.

He is also remembered for his writings and oratorical skills. Even though he was the author of the first Venezuelan novel he is better known for his economic and political essays. The relevance attained by his essays is shown by the fact that he was quoted by Leo Tolstoy in Resurrection. He was also active as a philologist and a botanist. He is considered as the best orator in Venezuela's parliamentary history.

Within Venezuela's history, he epitomizes the strength of moral character against the oppressive force of government, as expressed by his stance against the attack on Congress ordered on 24 January 1848 by President Jose Tadeo Monagas. All Venezuelans learn in school the famous phrase by which he responded to Monagas' envoys, which wanted him to validate the violation of Congress: "Go and tell General Monagas that my dead body can be carried, but Fermin Toro doesn't prostitute himself".

== Death and legacy ==
His remains were located at the Panteón Nacional on 23 April 1876. Several universities and schools have been named in his honour, including the Liceo Fermin Toro, Venezuela's largest and more prestigious public school. He has been the object of several biographies. One of Caracas main avenues is named after him, while his statue is at the entrance of the Liceo Fermin Toro. The Venezuelan National Congress has four lateral squares, each of which bears the name of a famous parliamentarian, with one of them honoring him.

== Family ==
He belonged to the family of the marquesses del Toro of Caracas. His great grandfather, Francisco Rodríguez del Toro e Isturiz, the second Marquess, had been a colonial Governor and Captain General of Venezuela, while a brother of the latter José Rodríguez del Toro was Rector (President or Vice-Chancellor) of the University of Salamanca in Spain. Fermín Toro’s second cousins Francisco Rodríguez del Toro (the fourth Marquess) and Fernando Rodriguez del Toro, were important figures of the Venezuelan Independence process, while his also second cousin Maria Teresa Rodriguez del Toro y Alayza was the wife of Simón Bolívar.

== Works ==
Among his publications are the following ones:

- Essay
  - Reflexiones sobre la Ley del 10 de abril de 1834.
  - Los estudios filosóficos en Venezuela, Europa y América
  - Cuestión de imprenta.
  - Descripción de los honores fúnebres consagrados a los restos del Libertador Simón Bolívar (1842)
  - Discursos ante la Convención de Valencia (1858)
  - Ensayo gramatical sobre el idioma guajiro, (the manuscript was compiled by Adolf Ernst in 1872)
- Novels
  - Los Mártires (1842).
  - La Viuda de Corinto (1837)
  - La Sibila de los Andes.

== Institutions named after Fermín Toro ==
- Universidad Fermín Toro, Barquisimeto ()
- Colegio Universitario Fermín Toro, Barquisimeto ()
- Liceo Fermín Toro (Caracas)
- Instituto de Estudios Parliamentarios Fermín Toro (Caracas)

== See also ==
- List of ministers of foreign affairs of Venezuela

Political offices
Preceded by Wenceslao Urrutia	45th Minister of Foreign Affairs of Venezuela; 14 April 1858 – 17 June 1859	Succeeded by Miguel Herrera
