= Renato Beluche =

Venezuelan sailor (1780–1860)

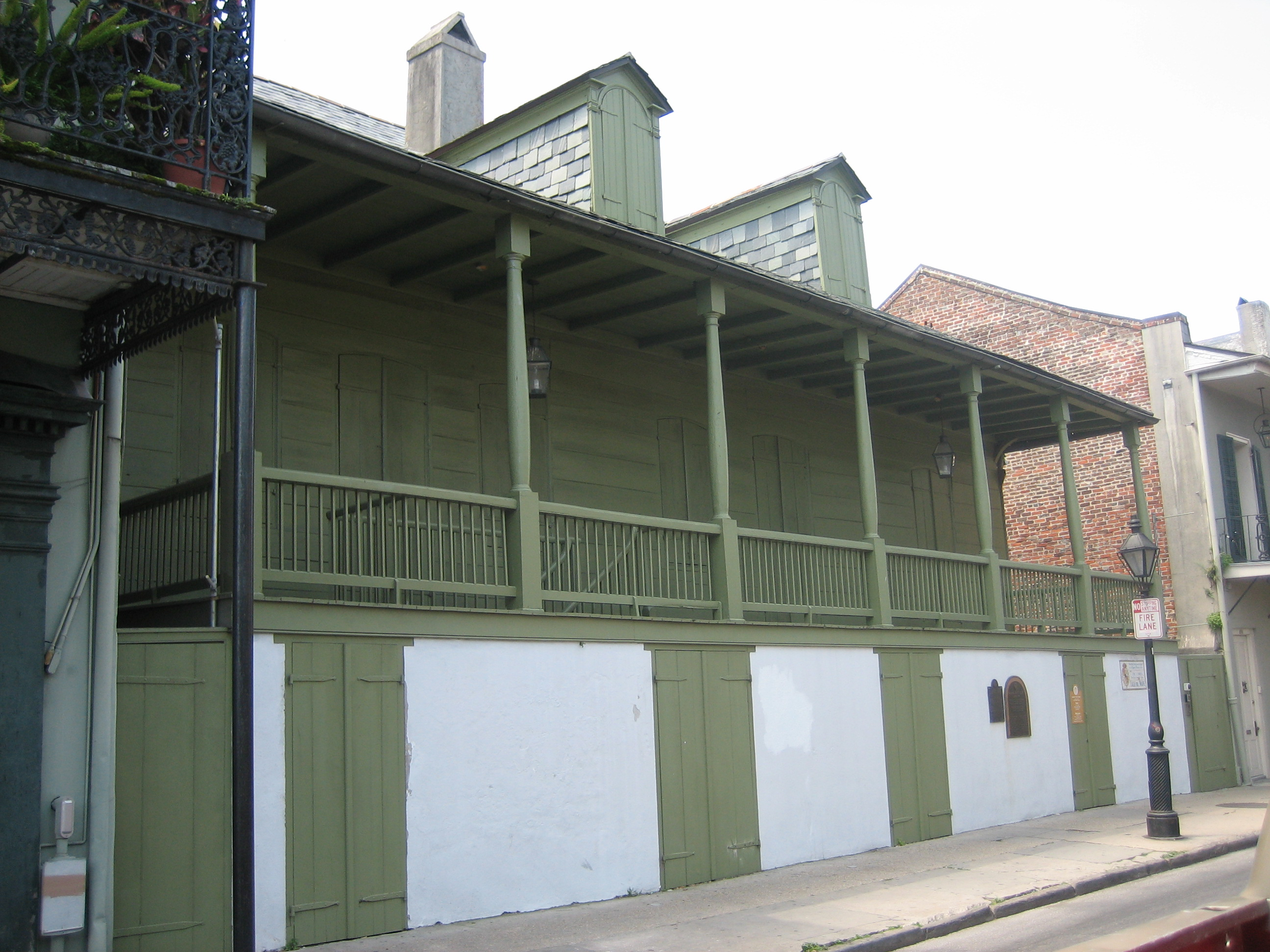
- Birthplace of Beluche
- Born: 15 December 1780; New Orleans, Spanish Louisiana
- Died: 4 October 1860 (aged 79); Puerto Cabello, Venezuela
- Other names: Pierre Brugman, Pedro Brugman
- Occupations: Merchant, pirate, privateer
- Years active: 1805–1850

Renato Beluche (15 December 1780 – 4 October 1860) was a Louisiana-born Venezuelan merchant, pirate and privateer active in the early nineteenth century Gulf Coast. Born in New Orleans, Spanish Louisiana, to a French smuggler, Beluche went to sea as a pilot's mate in 1802 on board a Spanish Navy warship. By 1805, he had left the navy and become the master of a schooner. Using this ship, Renato turned to piracy and raided Spanish and British merchantmen operating in the gulf.

After becoming associated with Spanish American patriots in Latin America, Renato joined their cause, spending over a decade fighting against the Spanish Empire for the cause of Latin American independence. During this time, he joined the pirate Jean Lafitte in assisting the United States to repel a British invasion. Despite his service for the Gran Colombian government, Renato participated in a rebellion against them in 1836, for which he was exiled for nine years. After returning, he helped the government suppress another rebellion, before retiring in 1850, spending the last decade of his life in relative peace and comfort in Puerto Cabello. His remains were posthumously reinterred in the National Pantheon of Venezuela a decade later.

== Early life ==
Renato Beluche was born in New Orleans, Spanish Louisiana, in 1780 to René Beluche, a recent French emigrant and master wigmaker and hairdresser, and Rose Delaporte. The house he was born in is now a historic house museum known as Madame John's Legacy. The building was erected in 1725 and sold to René in approximately 1777. René owned both a wig-making business that was a front for smuggling operations, and a plantation in Chalmette, Louisiana. Renato spent much of his early life on the Chalmette plantation.

In 1802 Beluche went to sea as a pilot's mate on a ship of the line of the Spanish Navy, and by 1805 he had left the navy and become the master of a merchant schooner. By this time, the Lafitte brothers Jean and Pierre had established a smuggling base in Barataria Bay on the Louisiana coast. Beluche joined them, and flying the French flag, he captured Spanish and British merchantmen and sent them to Grande-Terre or Cartagena de Indias in New Granada, depending on the ship's nationality. Beluche may have used the alias Pierre Brugman or Pedro Brugman, though it appears that this may have been an associate or a convenient look-alike.

== Revolutionary activities ==
In 1813, Beluche became associated with the Gran Colombian patriots who were rebelling against Spanish rule with the letter of marque of Venezuelan general Simón Bolívar. Beluche spent the next decade in the service of the Gran Colombian revolutionaries, interrupted only by a brief period when he joined with Jean Lafitte and the Baratarian smugglers who had come to the aid of Andrew Jackson during the Battle of New Orleans.

After serving as an artillery commander beside Dominique You in the Battle of New Orleans, Beluche was drawn back into the Gran Colombian struggle. He participated in the Aux Cayes Expedition, the Battle of Lake Maracaibo, and the Siege of Puerto Cabello on 8 November 1823. In 1824, Beluche settled his family in Puerto Cabello, and after the Spanish were expelled from Gran Colombia, he worked as a captain in coastal shipping. In 1836 he fought on the losing side of a rebellion against the Venezuelan government and was exiled for nine years. He returned in 1845 and helped crush another revolt that raged from 1848 until 1850.

== Death ==
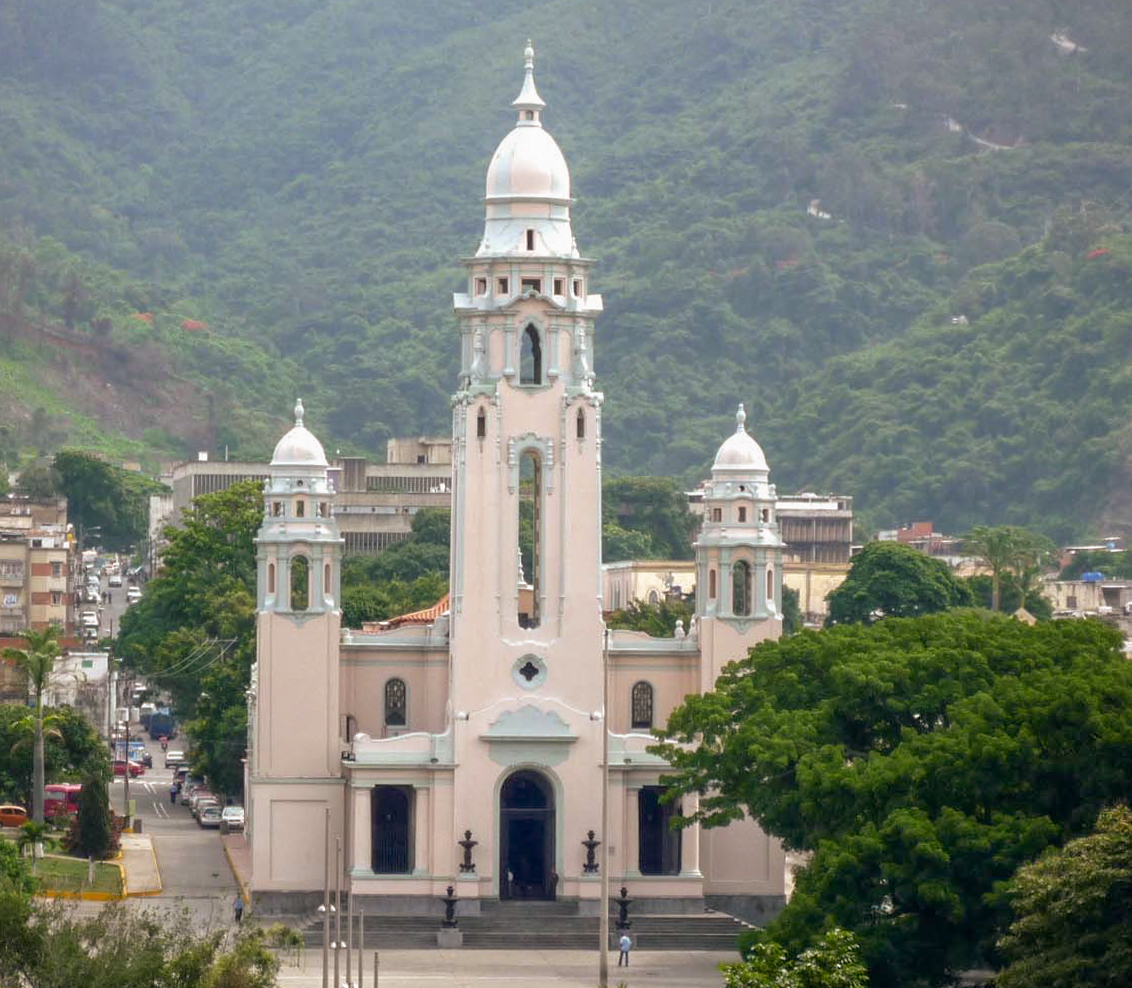
The National Pantheon of Venezuela, where Beluche is interred.

For the next decade, Beluche led a quiet existence and died in Puerto Cabello in 1860. A century after his death, his remains were re-interred in the National Pantheon of Venezuela on 22 July 1963.

== See also ==
- Lafitte's Blacksmith Shop
