= Gabriel Bracho =

- Gabriel Bracho
- Born: Gabriel Bracho; May 25, 1915; Los Puertos de Altagracia, Zulia, Venezuela
- Died: March 6, 1995 (aged 79); Caracas, Venezuela
- Education: Academy of Fine Arts, Caracas; Escuela de Artes Aplicadas, Chile
- Known for: Painting, murals
- Notable work: Nochebuena de los Negros, Tierra, Petróleo, Stalingrado, El Abanderado, Manifestación, murals: Venezuela (1952–53), Boyacá (1983)
- Style: Social realism
- Movement: Venezuelan social realism
- Awards: Exposición de Pintura Realista Comprometida, Bulgaria (1976), Armando Reverón Award (1986), National Prize of Plastic Arts of Venezuela (1994)

Gabriel Bracho (25 May 1915 in Los Puertos de Altagracia, Zulia – 6 March 1995 in Caracas) was a Venezuelan artist. He and César Rengifo were major exponents of the social realism artistic movement in Venezuela. His work is permeated by social, political and historical themes.

From 1936 to 1939 he studied at the Academy of Fine Arts in Caracas and he continued his studies at the Escuela de Artes Aplicadas in Chile until 1942. In 1943 he began a tour of various countries including the USA, Bolivia, Argentina, Uruguay and Italy which culminated in him living and working in Paris.

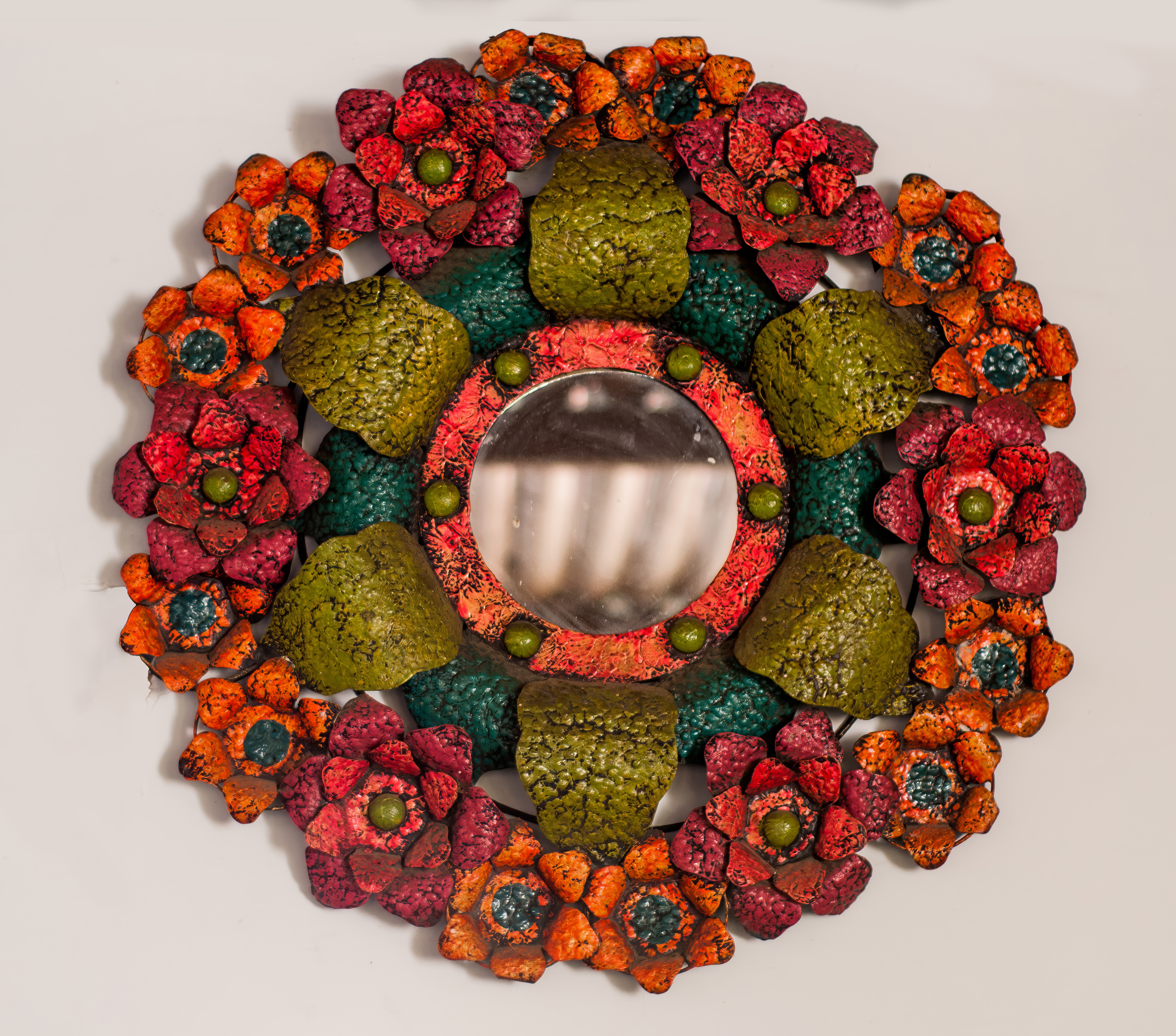
Flower mirror by Gabriel Bracho

Initially influenced by the impressionists, expressionists and cubists he embraced the nationalistic and revolutionary trends of the Mexican muralists. He returned to Venezuela in 1950 and exhibited in the Caracas Museum of Fine Arts. In 1951 he exhibited at the museum of fine arts in Caracas and in 1953 he completed work on his first major mural Venezuela (now destroyed). He traveled to Mexico where he met and compared notes with his friends Diego Rivera and David Alfaro Siqueiros amongst others, and in 1957 he exhibited his work at the palace of fine art in Mexico City.

In 1958, he returned to Venezuela and with others founded the Taller de Arte Realista group. In 1960 he completed the mural Cuba located in La Casa de las Américas in Habana.

In 1976 he won the first prize at the Exposición de Pintura Realista Comprometida in Bulgaria and in 1986 was awarded the Armando Reveron prize.

In 1994 he held a major exhibition in the Venezuelan national gallery and in the same year was awarded the prestigious National Prize of Plastic Arts of Venezuela.

He died in Caracas on 6 March 1995.

His main works include Nochebuena de los Negros, Tierra, Stalingrado, Petróleo, Horoshima, El Abanderado, Manifestación and the murals Venezuela (1952–1953), Lino de Clemente (1966–1967), Diversiones, Venezuela (1971–1972), and Boyacá (1983) located in the presidential palace Miraflores.

His home in Los Puertos de Altagracia is now a museum dedicated to his memory and work.
