= Adolf Ernst =

Venezuelan botanist (1832–1899)

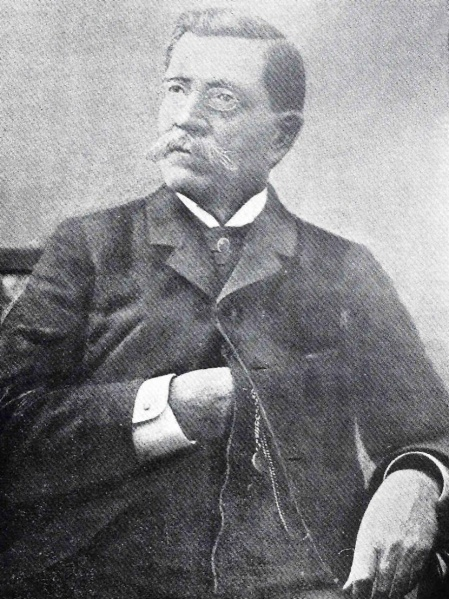
- Born: 6 October 1832; Primkenau, Lower Silesia, Prussia
- Died: 12 August 1899 (aged 66); Caracas, Venezuela
- Education: University of Berlin
- Scientific career
- Fields: Botany
- Workplaces: Central University of Venezuela
- Author abbrev. (botany): Ernst

Adolf Ernst (October 6, 1832 – August 12, 1899) was a Prussian-born scientist. Ernst settled in Venezuela in 1861, where he taught at the Central University of Venezuela. He became the most important scientist in the country during the second half of the 19th century and was a key figure in the creation of the Museum of Natural Science and the National Library of Venezuela, where he also served as its director.

He developed important scientific works in this country. Also, as a university professor, he had a marked influence on generations of scientists from the second half of the nineteenth century in Venezuela.

He is regarded as the founder of the Venezuelan positivist school.

== Biography ==
His parents were Adolf Ernst and Catalina Bischoff. He studied high school in his hometown, and then enrolled at the University of Berlin where he studied natural sciences, pedagogy and modern languages. At this German institution, he met two children of the Venezuelan general Judas Tadeo Piñango, with whom he struck up a warm friendship, who encouraged him to travel to Venezuela. On December 2, 1861, he came to Venezuela from Hamburg. on August 5, 1864, he married Enriqueta Tresselt with whom he had five children.

In May 1867, now completely adapted to the Venezuelan life, he founded the Society of Physical and Natural Sciences of Caracas and later the National Museum in 1874. In 1876, he became the director of the National Library, to which he made considerable contributions. During the government of Antonio Guzmán Blanco, he participated in the international exhibitions organization in Vienna (1873), Bremen (1874), Santiago de Chile and Philadelphia (1876). In 1874, at the request of the President, he organized the chair of Natural History at the Central University of Venezuela, where he spread the Jean-Baptiste Lamarck's and Charles Darwin's theories of biological evolution, which were fundamental in Zoology and Botany.

He was the inspiration and founder of positivism in Venezuela, and among his chief disciples were Lisandro Alvarado, José Gil Fortoul and Rafael Villavicencio. In 1889, the Central University of Venezuela awarded him the degree of Doctor of Philosophy, in recognition of his academic work. Ernst developed comprehensive research in botany, zoology and ethnography. He also did work in geography, geology, language, anthropology, Physics, paleontology and archeology.

Adolph Ernst carried out important studies in different regions of Venezuela, such as the Caracas valley, Lake Maracaibo, the Andes, the Venezuelan Guayana, the island of La Orchila, the Aroa copper mines and Betijoque diamond mines. He created the precursor of ethnobotany in Venezuela by developing themes such as Historia de la Yuca (1890) and El Banano (1893). The ethnographic and archaeological collections acquired by the National Museum formed the basis for publishing a series of descriptive anthropological works of diverse indigenous groups in the country, including studies of the Wayuu, the Ayamanes, and the Warao. In his archaeological work, he focused on the Andean region, specifically describing the stone plaques known as "bat wings." He also provided ethnographic data on Andean Aboriginals and spent time with petroglyphs (1885-1889). One of Adolf Ernst's main merits was his disclosing Venezuelan material to the international scientific societies of the nineteenth century, and publishing their contributions in journals such as Globus, Zeitschrift für Ethnologie, American Anthropologist and in the Bulletin de la Société du Anthropologie Paris.

== Works ==
- ERNST, A. 1875: “Catálogo de la biblioteca de la Universidad de Caracas”. Imprenta de La Opinión Nacional. Caracas
- ERNST, A. 1876: “Enumeración sistemática de las especies de moluscos hallados hasta ahora en los alrededores de Caracas y demás partes de la República”. Apuntes Estadísticos del Distrito Federal. 77-85
- ERNST, A. 1884-1886: “La Exposición Nacional de Venezuela en 1883”. Imprenta de La Opinión Nacional. 2 volúmenes Caracas
- ERNST, A. 1986: “Obras completas”. Blas Bruni Celli, (Compilador). Presidencia de la República. 6 volúmenes. Caracas
