= Cecilio Acosta =

Venezuelan poet and journalist (1818–1881)

Cecilio Acosta Revete
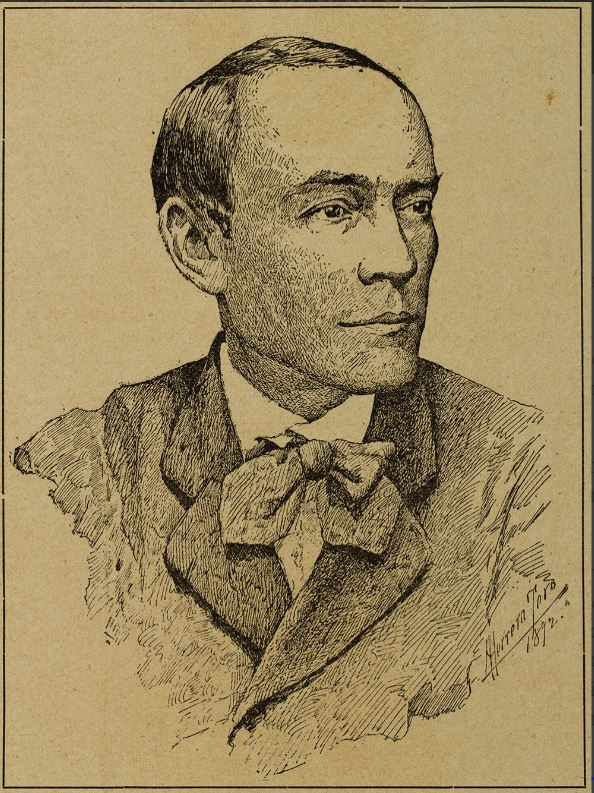
- Cecilio Acosta by Antonio Herrera Toro
- Born: 1 February 1818; San Diego de Los Altos, Miranda, Viceroyalty of New Granada
- Died: 8 July 1881 (aged 63); Caracas, Venezuela
- Resting place: National Pantheon of Venezuela
- Known for: Writer, journalist, lawyer, professor
- Political party: Liberal

Cecilio Juan Ramón del Carmen Acosta Revete (1 February 1818 – 8 July 1881), was a Venezuelan writer, journalist, lawyer, philosopher and humanist.

== Career ==
Acosta was born in 1818 in a small village known as San Diego de los Altos. Acosta is the son of Ignacio Acosta and Juana Margarita Revete Martínez. He was baptized by the priest Mariano Fernández Fortique, later Bishop of Guayana and one of Acosta's main mentors. His early education comes from this priest. In 1831 he entered the seminary Tridentino of Santa Rosa in Caracas and began his training to become a priest. In 1840, he leaves the seminary and enters the Academy of Mathematics, where he became a surveyor. Later on, Acosta studied philosophy and law at the Central University of Venezuela, receiving his law degree. Around 1846 and 1847, he began publishing essays in newspapers, such as, La Epoca and El Centinela de la Patria.

Between 1908 and 1909, Acosta published five volumes of complete works, that showed his political, economic, social and educational ideas. He also wrote poetry.

Cecilio Acosta has become, in Venezuela, one of the most remembered characters and intellectuals of the 19th century. This is due to his intellectual work in different areas of knowledge (such as law, sociology, history and lexicography) and his ethical and stoic attitude towards the continuous abuses of authoritarianism and personalism, as styles of politics during the consolidation phase of the Venezuelan national state and even afterwards.

As a liberal politician, he spent years in internal exile under the dictatorship of the military Antonio Guzmán Blanco. He later died on 8 July 1881. Since 1937, his remains have been located at the National Pantheon of Venezuela.

Mourning his death, José Martí, who had met him personally shortly before, wrote an elegy: "His hands, made to handle the times, were capable of creating them. For him the Universe was home; his homeland, room; history, mother; and the men, brothers, and their pains family things, that ask him to cry. He gave it to seas. Everyone who has too much of an extraordinary quality hurts those who don't have it, and he felt bad that he loved so much. In matters of affection, his fault was the excess. One of his phrases gives an idea of his way of loving: “to oppress with treats”. He, who thought like a prophet, loved like a woman. Whoever gives himself to men is devoured by them, and he gave himself whole; but it is a wonderful law of nature that only what is given is complete; and one does not begin to possess life until we empty our own without hesitation and without charge for the good of others. He denied many times his defense to the powerful: not to the sad. In his eyes, the weakest was the kindest. And the needy, was the owner of him. When he had to give, he gave everything: and when he no longer had anything, he gave love and books. How many famous memories of high-ranking bodies of the State pass as from another, and it is their memory! How many elegant letters, in cool Latin, to the Pontiff of Rome, and they are his letters! How small an article, a gift for the eyes, bread for the mind, that appear as if from the hands of students, in the newspapers that these give to the wind, and are from that long-suffering man, who dictated them smiling, without violence or fatigue, hiding to do good, and the greatest of goods, in the shade! What colossus understanding! What a feather of gold and silk! and what a soul of a dove!”

There was a commemoration of the centenary of the death of Acosta in 1981.

Honors

- Catholic University Cecilio Acosta, a private university, was named after him. It was founded in 1983 in the city of Maracaibo.

== Work ==
Acosta wrote about politics, jurisprudence, economics, history, obituaries, literature, philology, poetry and epistolary.

He maintained the idea of modernizing the education system from a decentralizing vision, that incorporated new disciplines of knowledge that should be accompanied by the practice of the workshop as a key word for the progress of the country and that Acosta calls him the 'true lord of a new civilization'.

- “Reforma de las Leyes II y III del Código de Instrucción Pública (1847);
- “Cosas sabidas y Cosas por saberse” (1856)
- “Revista de Europa y de los Estados Unidos de Norteamérica” (1879).
- Known things and knowing (1856). Original title, Cosas sabidas y cosas por saberse.
- Charity or fruits of the cooperation of all to the well of all (1855). Original title, Caridad o frutos de la cooperación de todos al bien de todos.
- Studies of International Law (1917)
- Influence of the historical-political elements in the dramatic literature and in the novel (posthumous, 1887)
- Complete works (1908–1909)
- Complete works (Fundación La Casa de Bello, Definite, 1981)

== Bibliography ==
- Acosta, C. (1982). Obras completas. Caracas: Fundación La Casa Bello. Acosta, C. (1983). Pensamiento político venezolano del siglo xix. Nro. 9. Caracas: Ediciones Conmemorativas del Bicentenario del Natalicio del Libertador.
- Congreso de la República. Barazarte, W. E. (2010). Aproximación al proyecto americano de don Andrés Bello. Maracay: UPEL. Bermúdez, M. (1983). Cecilio Acosta, un signo en el tiempo. Caracas: Academia Nacional de la Historia, El libro menor, nro. 47. Díaz Sánchez, R. (1981). Cecilio Acosta 1818–1881. Caracas: Biblioteca de Temas y Autores Mirandinos nro. 2. Homenaje al Libertador Simón Bolívar. Diccionario de historia de Venezuela. (1997). Caracas: Fundación Polar. Diccionario enciclopédico de las letras de América Latina (DELAL). (1995). Caracas: Fundación Ayacucho. González Guinán, F. (1909).
- Historia contemporánea de Venezuela. Tomo viii. Caracas: Tipografía Empresa El Cojo Ilustrado. Mañach, J. (1952). Martí, el Apóstol. 4° edición. Buenos Aires: Espasa-Calpe. Miliani, D. (2003). “Cecilio Acosta: el pronóstico de un drama nacional” En: Vigencia de Cecilio Acosta. Maracaibo, Universidad Católica Cecilio Acosta. Miliani, D., Zambrano, G., Rodríguez, A., Pérez, F., Rivas, R., Balza, T. (2003).
- Vigencia de Cecilio Acosta. Maracaibo: Universidad Católica Cecilio Acosta. Rojas, J. M. (1975). Biblioteca de escritores venezolanos contemporáneos. Ordenada con noticias biográficas. Caracas: Concejo Municipal del Distrito Federal. Sambrano Urdaneta, O. (1979). Cecilio Acosta. Vida y obra. Caracas: Ministerio de Educación.
