= José de Oviedo y Baños =

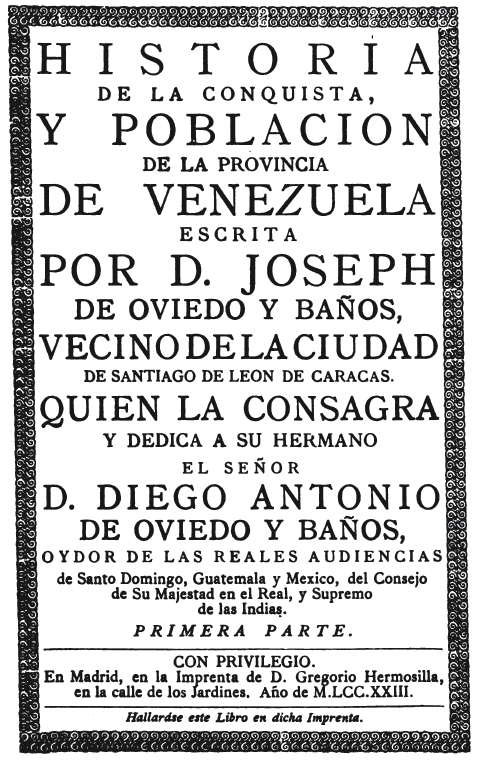
Historia de la conquista y población de la Provincia de Venezuela (1723), by José de Oviedo y Baños.

José de Oviedo y Baños (1671 - Caracas, 20 November 1738) was a Neogranadine military officer and historian.

== Career ==
Oviedo entered the military in Caracas at age 18, and became a Knight of the Order of Santiago in 1690. He retired from the army in 1730, having reached the rank of Lieutenant general in 1728.

== Work ==
His work Historia de la conquista y población de la Provincia de Venezuela (History of the conquest and settlement of Venezuela) considered one of the most important contemporary works on the history of the Spanish Empire's Venezuela Province. The work was published in Madrid in 1723, and based on research in the Empire's archives going back to Columbus.
