= César Rengifo =

Venezuelan painter

- César Rengifo
- Born: César Rengifo; May 14, 1915; Caracas, Venezuela
- Died: November 2, 1980 (aged 65); Caracas, Venezuela
- Education: Caracas School of Fine Arts; Academy of San Carlos, Mexico
- Known for: Painting, muralism, playwriting
- Notable work: Murals and realist paintings with social themes; numerous theatrical plays
- Style: Realism
- Movement: Venezuelan social realism, Mexican muralism

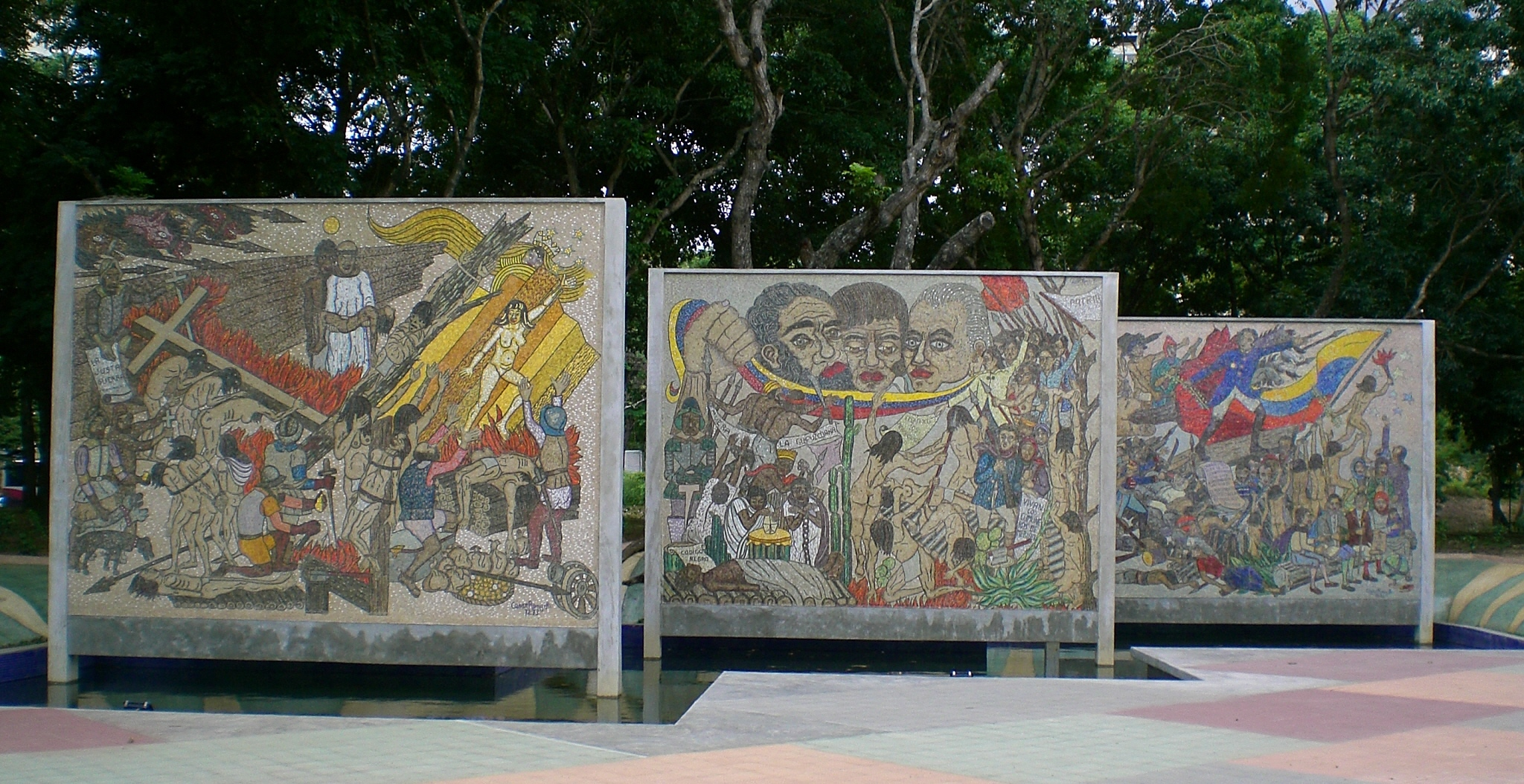

César Rengifo (Caracas, Venezuela, May 14, 1915 - Caracas, Venezuela, November 2, 1980) was a Venezuelan painter and playwright representative of the realistic trends in Venezuelan painting inspired by Mexican painting, along with Héctor Poleo, Pedro León Castro and Gabriel Bracho; All of them, after having started their studies in Caracas, went to Mexico in the best period of Mexican muralism.
