= Ricaurte =

Ricaurte may refer to:

== People ==
- Antonio Ricaurte, Colombian revolutionary
- Andrés Ricaurte, Colombian footballer

== Places ==
- Ricaurte Province, Boyacá
- Ricaurte, Cundinamarca, Colombia
- Ricaurte, Nariño, Colombia
- Ricaurte, TransMilenio station
- Ricaurte Municipality, Venezuela
