= María de la Concepción Palacios y Blanco =

Venezuelan creole elite

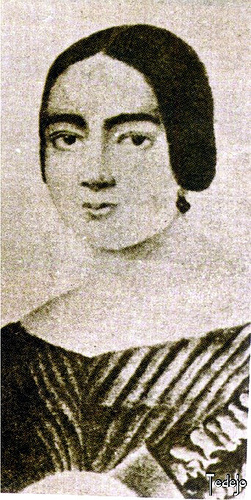
- Spouse: Juan Vicente Bolívar y Ponte
- Children: Simón Bolívar; María Antonia Bolívar Palacios; Juan Vicente Bolívar Palacios
- Parent: Feliciano Palacios y Sojo

María de la Concepción Palacios y Blanco (9 December 1758 – 6 July 1792) was an elite woman in the Captaincy General of Venezuela who, after the death of her husband Juan Vicente Bolívar y Ponte, led the Bolívar family and managed its affairs, along with her father Feliciano Palacios y Sojo. She had five children, including Simón Bolívar.

== Early life ==
There is little known about her early life and education. She was born on 9 December 1758 to Feliciano Palacios Sojo and Francisca Blanco Infante. A member of the influential Mantuano Palacios family with roots in the Americas stretching back to the Xedler emissaries of the Fuggers, she was sister of Esteban Palacios y Blanco and niece of Pedro Palacios y Sojo. She had olive skin and black hair. According to the custom of the Mantuanos, she married young, marrying Juan Vicente in 1773, when she was 14 or 15, after Juan Vicente was urged by Bishop Mariano Martí to settle down to prevent his sexual abuses on his San Mateo hacienda.

She was interested in music, playing the harp, the guitar, and singing as a soprano.

== During and after marriage ==
With Juan Vicente she had five children, Juan Vicente Bolívar Palacios (born 1781), María Antonia Bolívar Palacios (born 1777), Juana Nepomucena Bolívar Palacios (born 1779), Simón Bolívar (born 1783), and María del Carmen (1786) who lived only for a few hours. She inherited her husband's wealth after his death in 1786 and managed the vast fortune, protecting it from speculators and opportunists. The Bolívar fortune contained a dozen houses in Caracas and La Guaira, fields of cash crops, the Aroa copper mines, ranches, and hundreds of slaves. María de la Concepción Palacios y Blanco pursued the education of her son Simón, seeking out tutors like Francisco de Andújar, Simón Rodríguez, and Andrés Bello, who was a friend of her older son Juan Vicente.

She sent her brother Esteban to Spain to see about retrieving the title Marquis de San Luis for her son. The title had been received by her father-in-law but not pursued by Juan Vicente. The quest was called off to prevent the possible discovery of lower class ancestors.

== Sickness and death ==
She was already sick during the birth of Simón, who had to be nursed by her friend, a woman named Inés Mancebo de Miyares, and afterwards by Hipólita. She suffered from illness until 1792, when she died of laryngeal tuberculosis. She was treated with medicine and traditional slave remedies.
