= Hipólita Bolívar =

Wet nurse of the Bolívar family

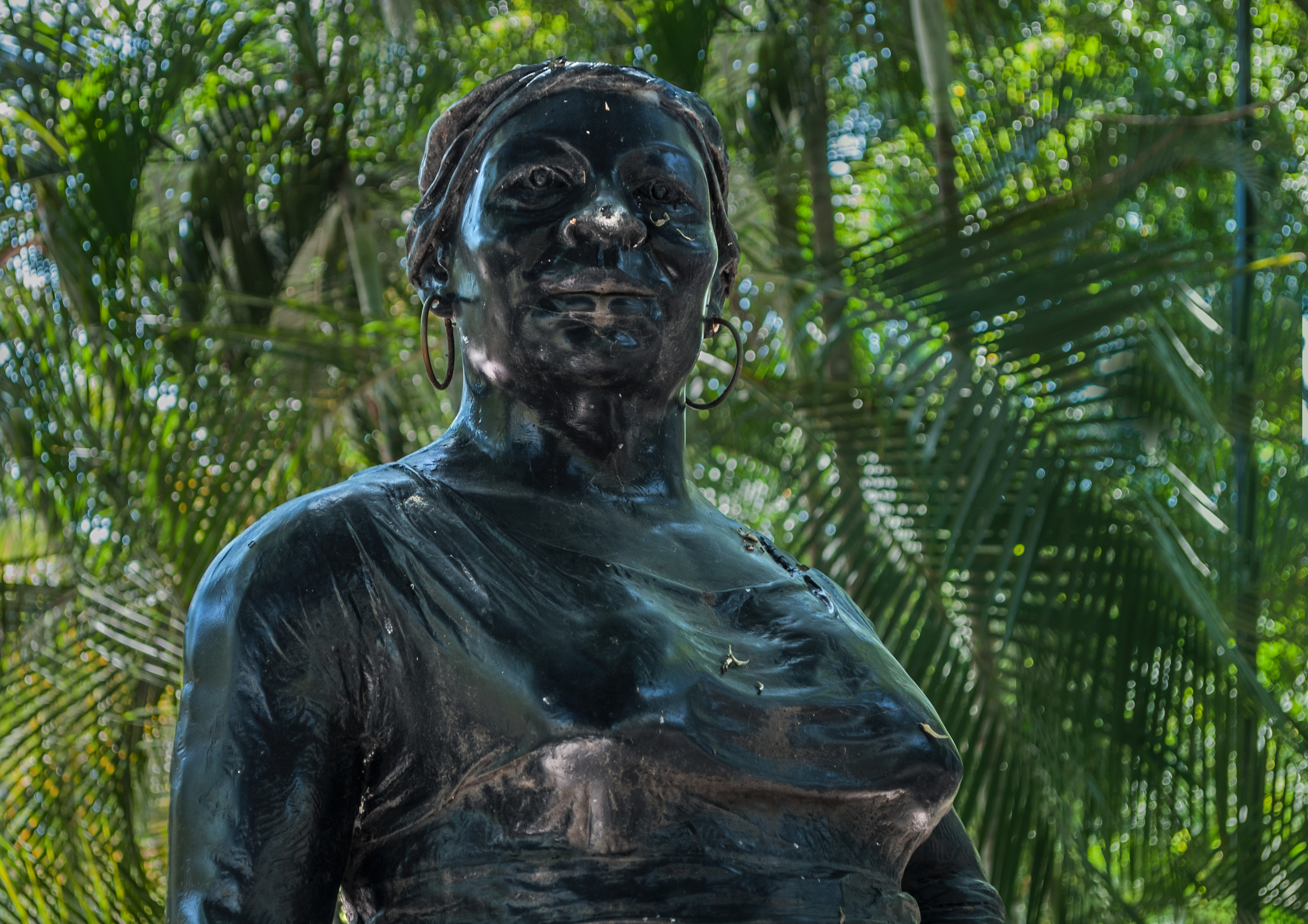
- Statue of Hipólita Bolívar in Negra Hipólita Park in Valencia, Venezuela
- Born: Bolívar Sugar Mill
- Died: June 25, 1835 (aged 71)
- Other name: Negra Hipólita
- Occupation: Wet nurse
- Relatives: Dionisio Bolívar; Bolívar family

Hipólita Bolívar, also known in Venezuela as Negra Hipólita, (possibly 13 August 1763 – 25 June 1835) was a wet nurse and slave owned by the Bolívar family who served as Simón Bolívar's wet nurse. She lived on their sugar mill estate in San Mateo and accompanying Bolívar's army until she was emancipated in 1821.

== Life ==
Her exact birth date is unknown. She may have been born on 13 August 1763, given the placement of Hippolytus of Rome on the Calendar of saints. She grew up and worked on the Bolívar Sugar Mill, one of the many estates of the Bolívar family. During the sugarcane harvest season, she met her husband, a slave named Mateo who was brought in from another plantation in Caucagua. They had a son together in San Mateo who was baptized as Dionisio Bolívar. A day after his baptism in July 1783, she was sent for to Caracas, where she worked as a wet nurse for newborn Simón Bolívar. His mother María de la Concepción Palacios y Blanco had poor health, and the young Simón was first nursed by Inés Mancebo de Miyares, and Hipólita took over. Dionisio was cared for by other women in Caracas. Simón's father Juan Vicente Bolívar y Ponte died in 1786 and María in 1792, leaving Simón an orphan in Hipólita's care at the age of nine, as well as his grandfather Feliciano Palacios y Sojo and uncle Carlos Palacios y Blanco. She is recorded in many anecdotes as well as Simón Bolívar's later writings as having been industrious and loving. He famously called her "the only father I knew".

After Simón left her, she eventually returned to the estate at San Mateo. Hearing that he had captured Caracas at the end of the Admirable Campaign, she began to briefly accompany him and his army at the Siege of Puerto Cabello, the Battle of Araure, and the Battle of Bárbula. In her duties in the army she comforted widows. He emancipated her, along with the rest of his slaves, in 1821. Dionisio, then a Sergeant, was also discharged from Simón's army and granted land from the Bolívar estate. In 1825, he spotted Hipólita in a crowd in Caracas which was greeting him, and went into them to hug her. Later, in 1826, when Simón was fighting far away from Venezuela, during a surge of anti-Bolívarian sentiment, she defended his name from accusations and arguments. She died on 25 June 1835.

== Legacy ==
Hipólita's role in Simón Bolívar's life has largely been supplanted in Venezuelan cultural memory by another slave of the Bolívar family, Matea Bolívar, because of her participation at later propagandized national events like Guzmán Blanco's opening of the National Pantheon in 1876. The administration of Hugo Chávez made an effort to recuperate Hipólita's prominence. His government created a social program called Misión Negra Hipólita which focuses on social integration and care for people in extreme poverty.

The Thea Musgrave opera Simón Bolívar depicts Hipólita as a maternal figure oppressed by her enslavement. The animated film Bolívar el héroe invents a son of Hipólita named Américo who symbolizes the desire for freedom, especially of slaves.

In March 2017, her remains were carried, along with Apacuana and Matea, to the National Pantheon, part of a procession to gather and deposit the women. Hipólita's remains were picked up on March 3 and interred on March 8.
