= Ingenio Bolívar =

Sugar mill owned by the Bolívar family

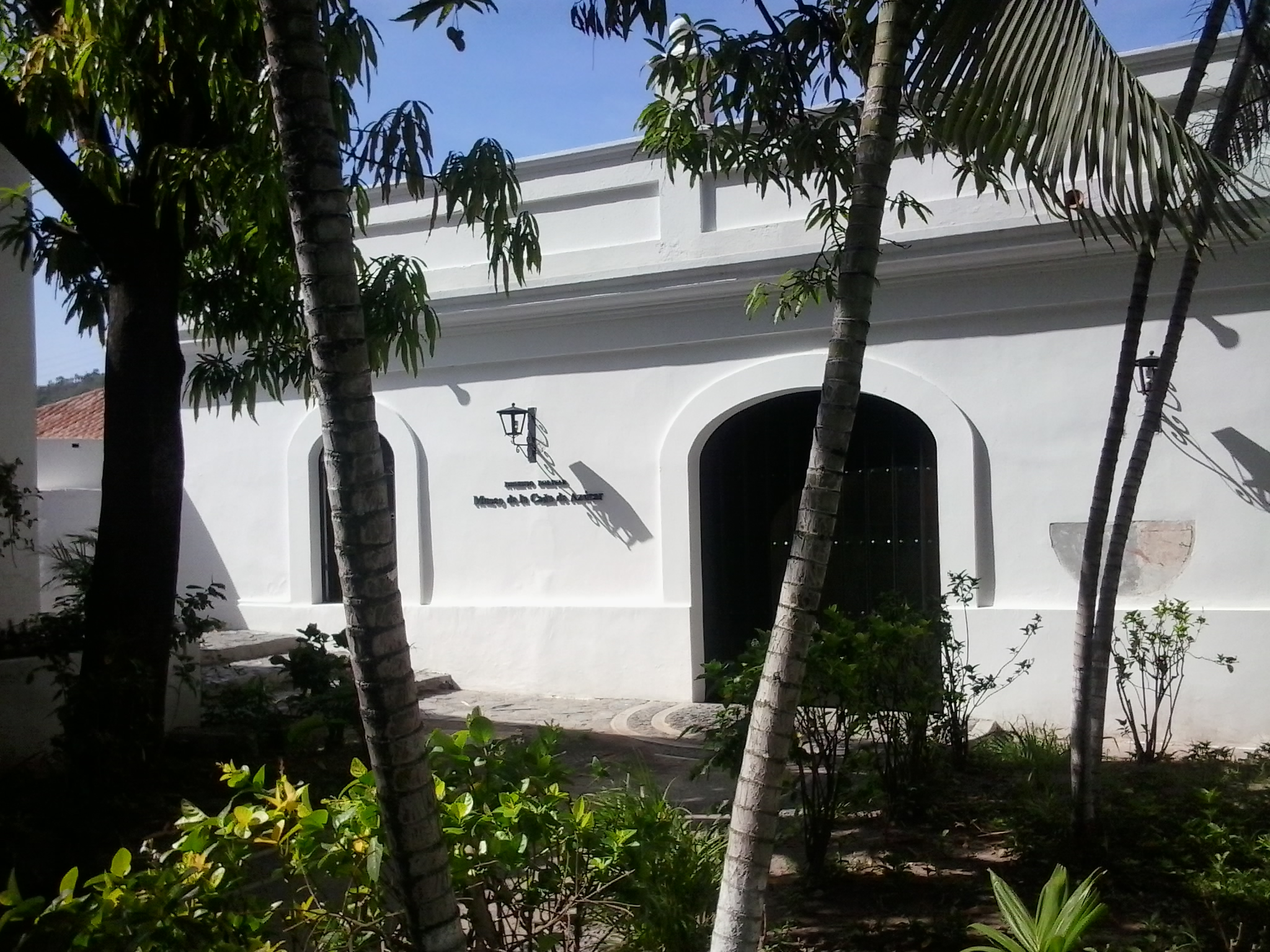
Entrance to the museum

Ingenio Bolívar (Bolívar sugar refinery), or El Ingenio, was a hacienda with a sugar refinery owned by the Bolívar family located in San Mateo, Aragua, Venezuela. It is now a museum.

== History ==
The property was granted as an encomienda to Simón de Bolívar y Castro by Diego Osorio Villegas, governor of the Venezuela Province in 1593. It was used first for sugar, and eventually, thanks to its successes, for rum, coffee, cotton, tobacco, and indigo. It was used as a secondary home for the family to their house in Caracas. Slaves from the estate complained of sexual abuse by Juan Vicente Bolívar years before Simón's birth. It was important in the early life of Simón, who spent much time there. His nurse, Hipólita, grew up on the plantation and returned to it after Simón grew up, eventually being emancipated with the rest of them by Simón in 1822.

The plantation, specifically the house, was the site of parts of the Battle of San Mateo, notably the famous episode of Antonio Ricaurte's destroying of a Royalist force by blowing himself up with an explosive magazine.

William Duane visited the mill and described its operation in 1822. It was then stewarded by María Antonia Bolívar Palacios. According to Duane's description, the eponymous sugar cane refinery was so large that loads on the back of mules were continuously processed. Nowhere in Venezuela had a steam-powered sugar refinery been built, the first coming in 1852, so the mill was powered by the Aragua River with a hydraulic system having been installed by Juan de Bolívar y Martínez de Villegas which was praised by Alexander von Humboldt. Its main house is located on a hill.

== Museum ==
It was acquired by the government of Venezuela during the presidency of Juan Vicente Gómez in 1924 for its importance in the life of Simón Bolívar, as well as importance as an agricultural operation. It was declared a National Historic Monument in 1964. In 2006, Hugo Chávez signed a presidential decree to turn the property into a national museum called Sugar Cane Museum (Spanish: Museo de la Caña de Azúcar), a project which was completed in 2014, aiming for maximum fidelity to the original construction, including salvaging old materials. The original buildings had not been destroyed, but the walls had been heavily damaged.

== Gallery ==
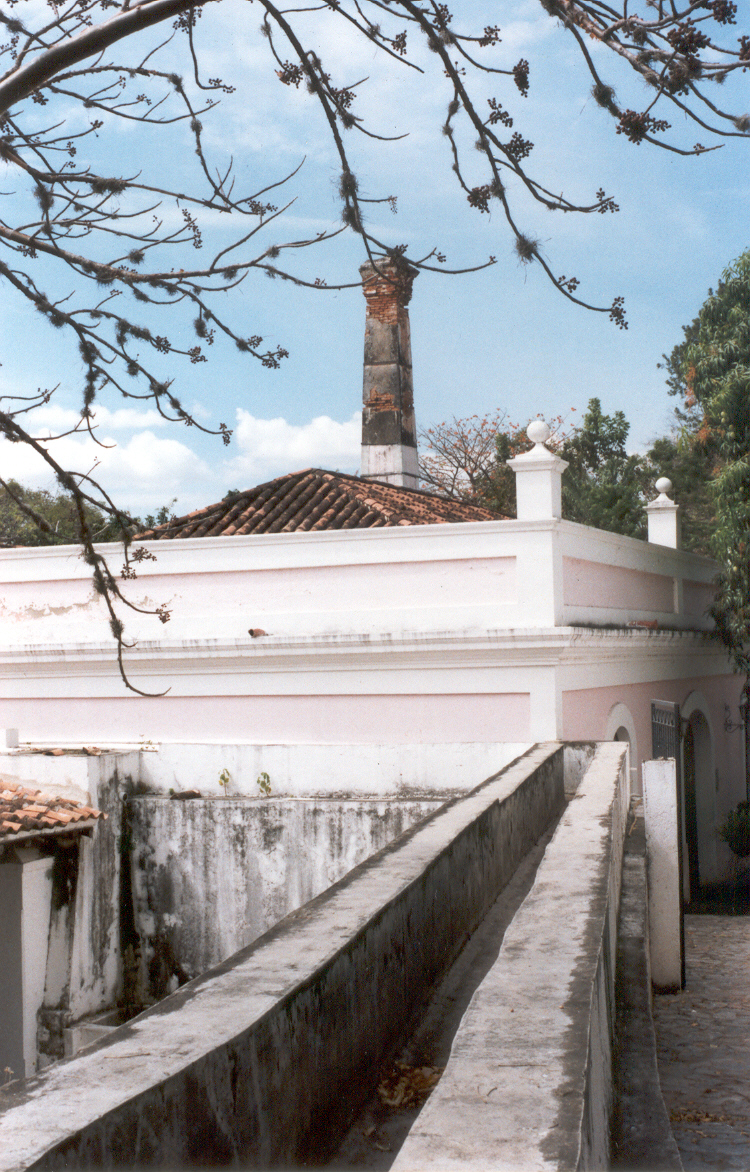
An intake canal in the refinery

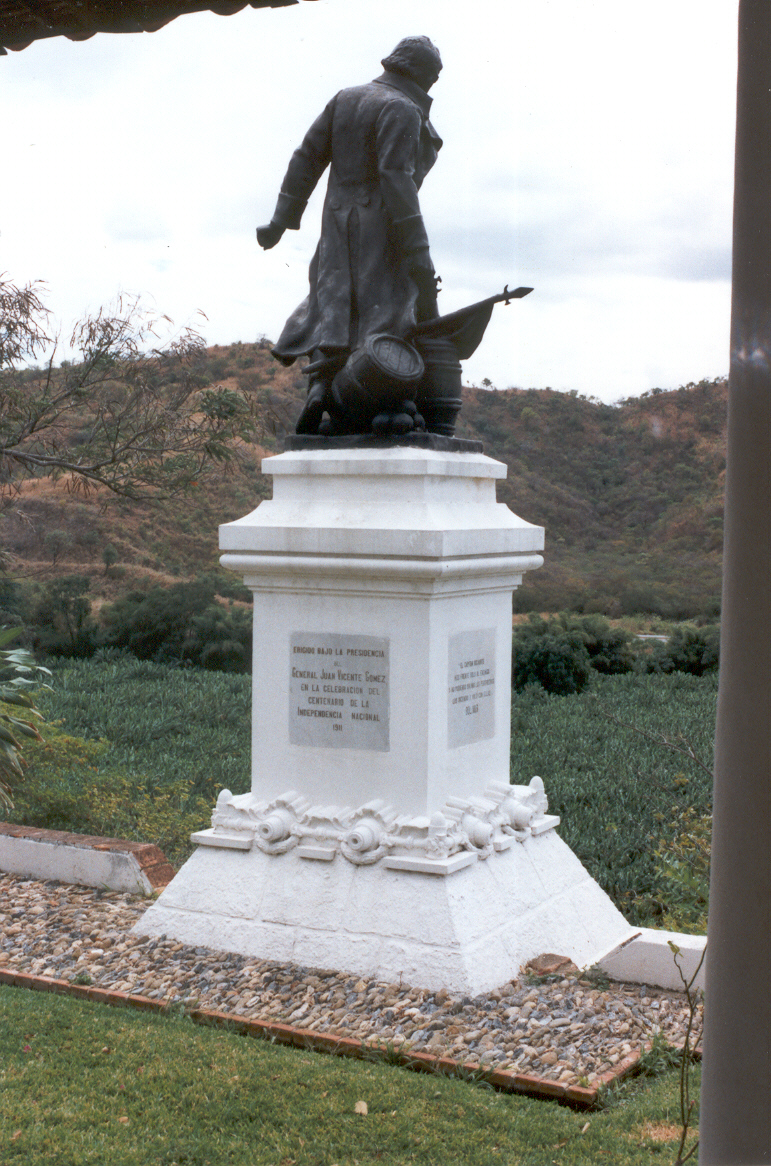
A statue of Ricaurte at the museum

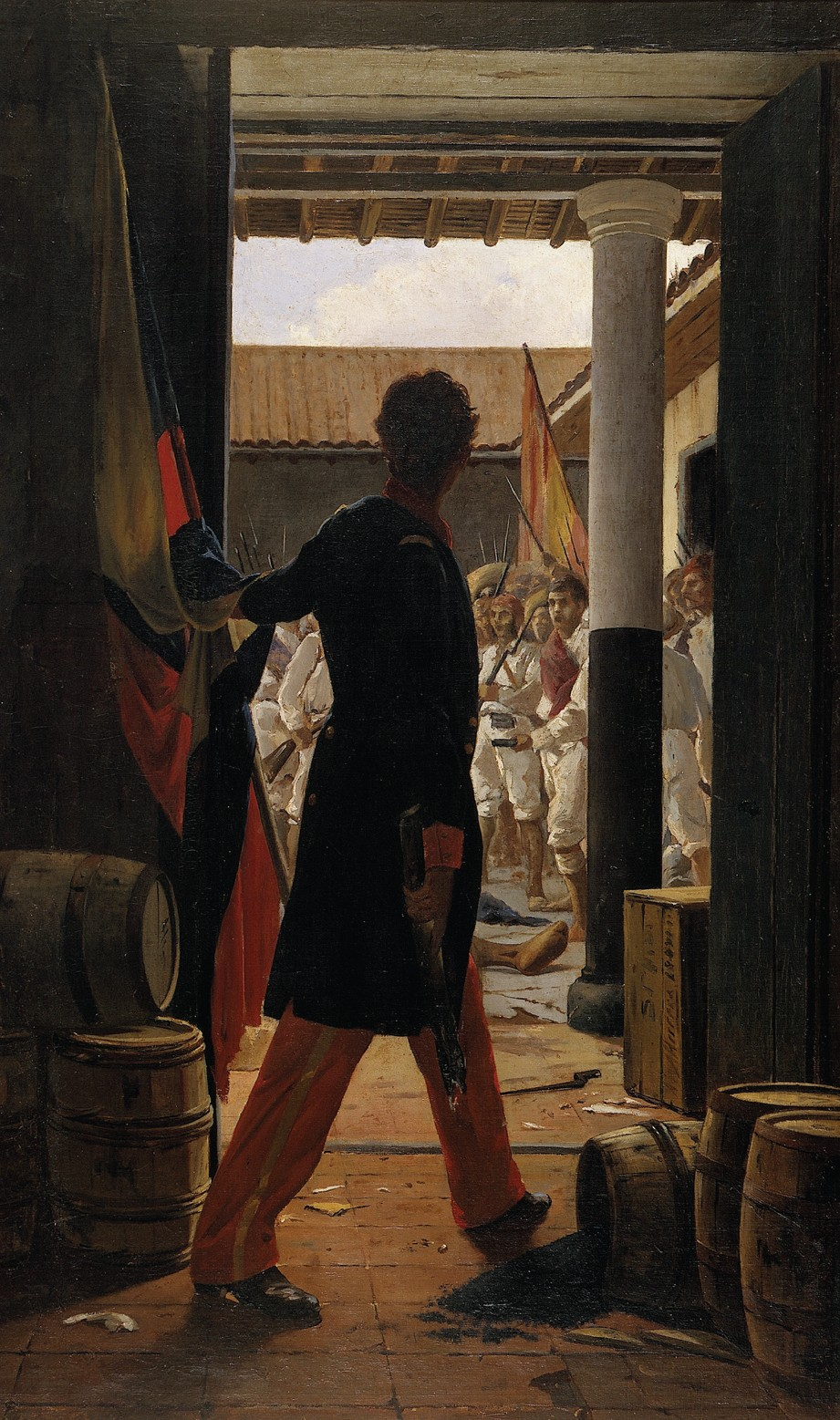
Antonio Herrera Toro's depiction of the death of Ricaurte

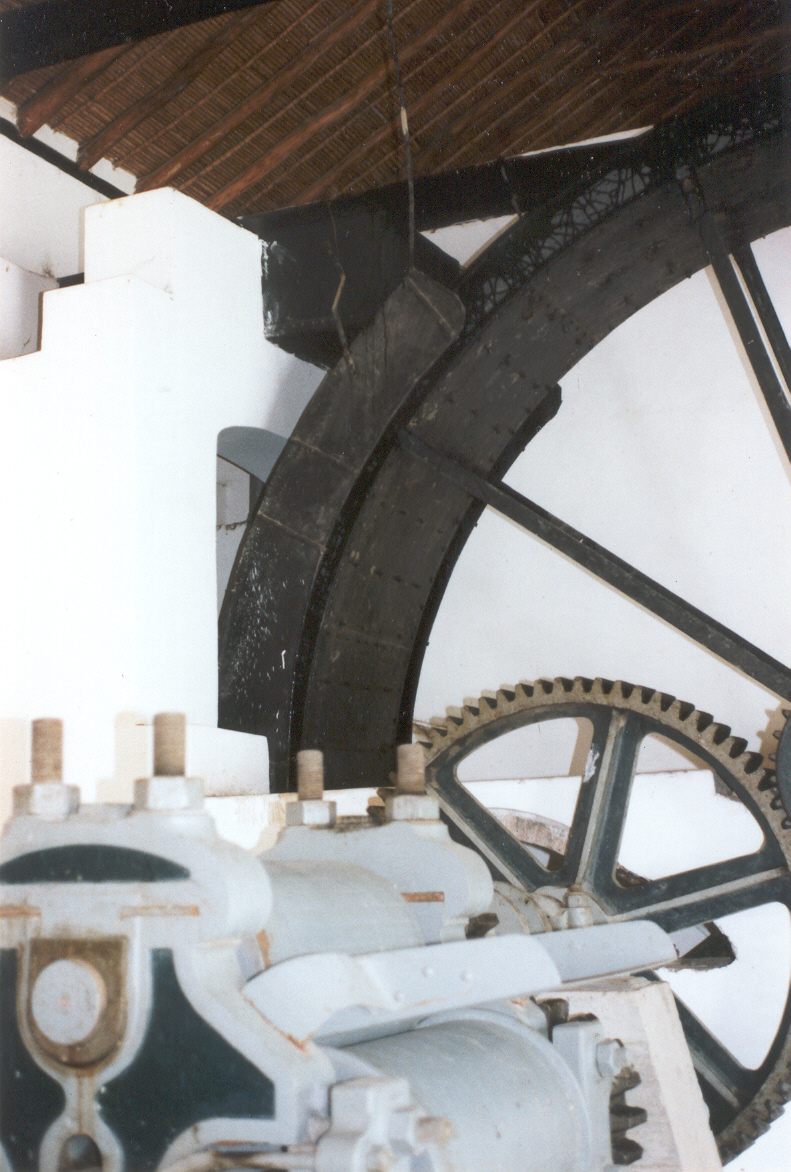
The mill's hydraulic system
