= Battle of San Mateo =

Battle of San Mateo may refer to:

- Battle of San Mateo (1814), a battle during the Venezuelan War of Independence
- Battle of San Mateo and Montalban, a battle on 1896 during the Philippine Revolution
- Battle of San Mateo (1899), a battle during the Philippine-American War
- Battle of San Matteo, a World War I battle

== See also ==
- Battle of La Victoria (1812), also called the Battle of San Mateo
