= Los Amos del Valle =

1979 novel by Francisco Herrera Luque

- First edition
- Author: Francisco Herrera Luque
- Publisher: Pomaire
- Publication date: 1979
- Publication place: Venezuela

Los Amos del Valle (Masters of the Valley) is a Venezuelan novel written by psychiatrist Francisco Herrera Luque and published in 1979. The novel describes Venezuelan life since the conquest of Caracas Valley until Simón Bolivar's baptism. The title makes reference to the Mantuano, noble families who had great control of this particular area.

== See also ==
- Venezuelan novels
- List of Venezuelan writers
