= Bolívar Municipality, Aragua =

Bolívar Municipality Municipio Bolívar
- Municipality
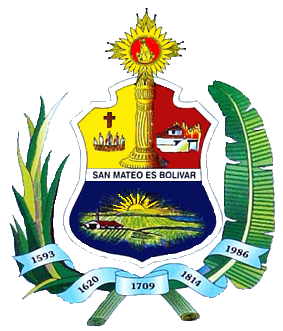
- Flag Coat of arms

- Location in Aragua

- Location in Venezuela
- Coordinates: 10°14′19″N 67°24′34″W
- Country: Venezuela
- State: Aragua
- Municipal seat: San Mateo

Government
  - Mayor: Marisol Rodríguez Mejías (PSUV)

Area
  - Total: 58 km^{2} (22 sq mi)

Population (2011)
  - Total: 38,047
  - Density: 660/km^{2} (1,700/sq mi)
- Time zone: UTC−4 (VET)
- Area code(s): 0244
- Website: Official website

Bolívar Municipality is one of the 18 municipalities (municipios) that makes up the Venezuelan state of Aragua and, according to the 2011 census by the National Institute of Statistics of Venezuela, the municipality has a population of 38,047. The town of San Mateo is the shire town of the Bolívar Municipality.

== Name ==
The municipality is one of several in Venezuela named "Bolívar Municipality" in honour of Venezuelan independence hero Simón Bolívar.

== Geography ==
The municipality is mountainous in the center and north, but in the south it is flat due to the depression formed by Lake Valencia. The temperature generally varies between 24.5 °C and 30 °C, while annual precipitation averages 900 mm.

== Economy ==
Agriculture and industry are the primary sources of income for the municipality, which contains some 3% of the industry of Aragua state. In agriculture, the municipality stands out for its production of papaya and cassava, in which it ranks 2nd and 3rd, respectively, in the state.

== Demographics ==
According to a 2007 population estimate by the National Institute of Statistics of Venezuela, the Bolívar Municipality has a population of 42,295 (up from 39,260 in 2000). This amounts to 2.5% of the state's population. The municipality's population density is 729.22 inhabitants per square kilometre (1,888.7/sq mi).

== Government ==
The mayor of the Bolívar Municipality is Freddy Arenas, elected on November 23, 2008, with 61% of the vote. He replaced César Augusto Barrera Ramirez shortly after the elections. The municipality is divided into one parish; Capital Bolívar.
