= Antonio Herrera Toro =

Venezuelan painter, art critic and professor

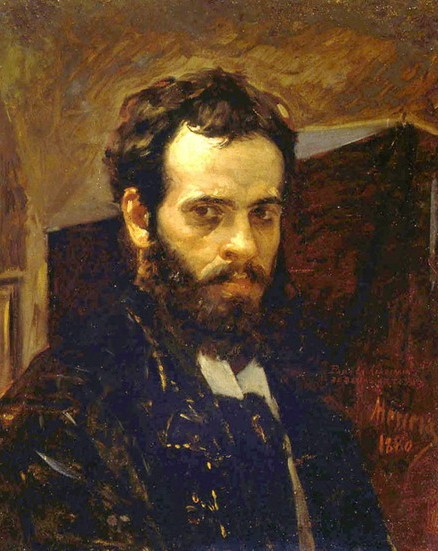
Self-portrait (1880)

Antonio Herrera Toro (16 January 1857 – 26 June 1914) was a Venezuelan painter, art critic and professor.

== Biography ==
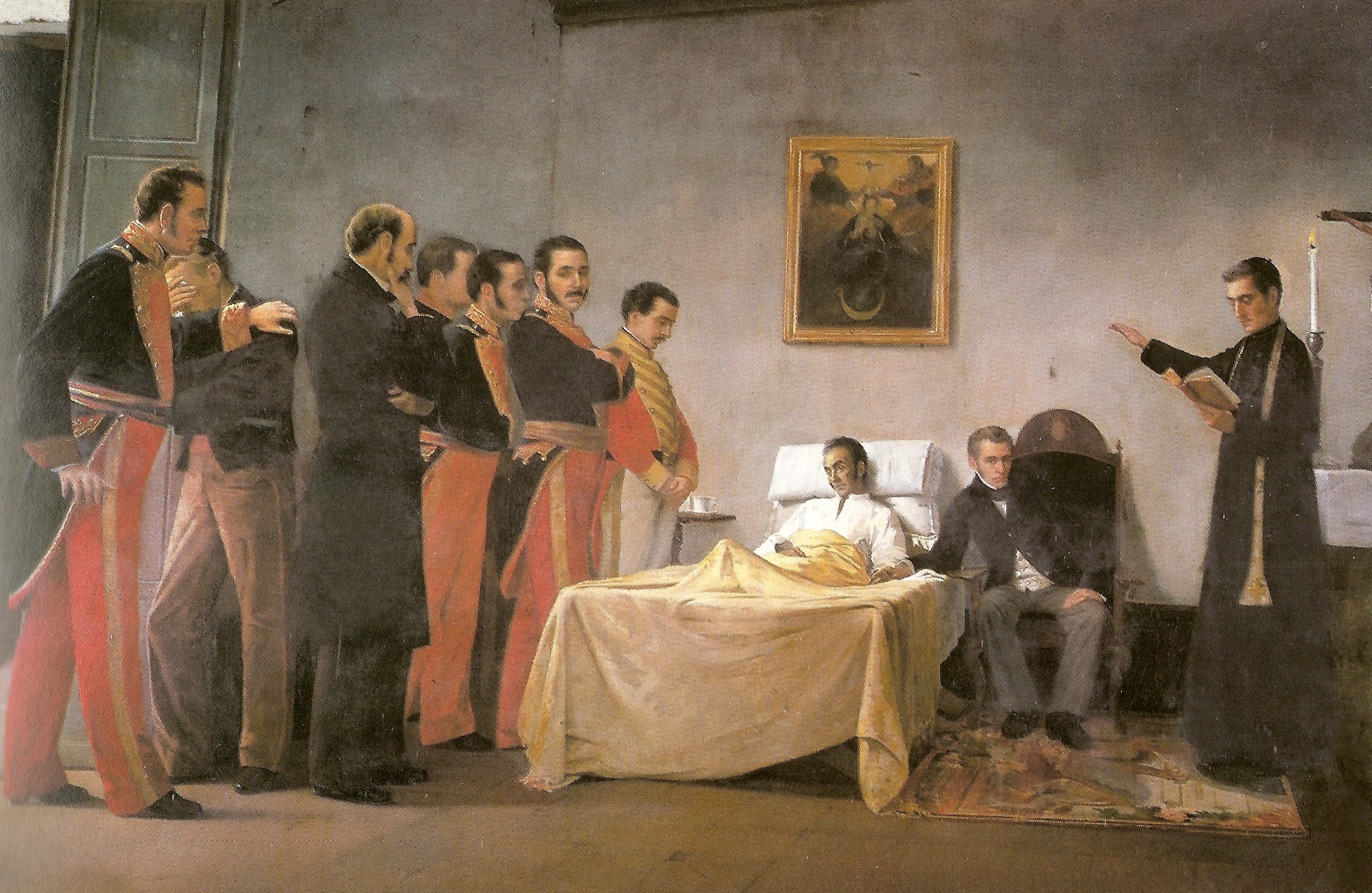
Final Moments of The Liberator

He was born in Valencia, Carabobo, and began his artistic studies in 1869 under the tutelage of Martín Tovar y Tovar. Five years later, he enrolled at the Academy of Fine Arts in Caracas, where he studied with José Manuel Maucó and Miguel Navarro Cañizares.

In 1875, he received a government scholarship that allowed him to study in Paris and Rome. He returned in 1881, with sketches of the Assumption of the Virgin, commissioned by José Antonio Ponte (1832–1883), the Archbishop of Caracas, that he used for murals at Caracas Cathedral, painted with the assistance of Cristóbal Rojas. In 1883, he portrayed the final moments of Simón Bolívar, to commemorate the centennial of Bolívar's birth. The following year, he travelled to Peru on behalf of Tovar, making sketches at the sites of the battles of Junín and Ayacucho for paintings that Tovar had been commissioned to create for the Palacio Federal Legislativo. As it turned out, Herrera had to complete the Battle of Ayacucho after Tovar's death.

He later took up journalistic pursuits in addition to painting, signing his writings with the pseudonym "Santoro". He was a major contributor to the cultural affairs biweekly, El Cojo Ilustrado (The Illustrated Cripple, named by one of its founders, who had a bad leg), and a co-founder of El Granuja (The Rogue).

In 1892, he was appointed Director of the government "Office of Buildings and Ornamentation" (Edificios y Ornato de Poblaciones). Later in 1908, he became Director of the Art Academy, following the death of Emilio Jacinto Mauri. Early the following year, he was faced with a strike by a large group of students who were demanding changes in the curriculum. Two years later, together with Pedro Arismendi Brito (1832–1914), a former general and respected man of letters, he drafted regulations for the "Instituto Nacional de Bellas Artes", which included music and acting as well as painting and sculpture. He also tendered his resignation, which was not accepted, so, despite being the target of student protests, he retained the position until his death in Caracas.

== Selected paintings ==
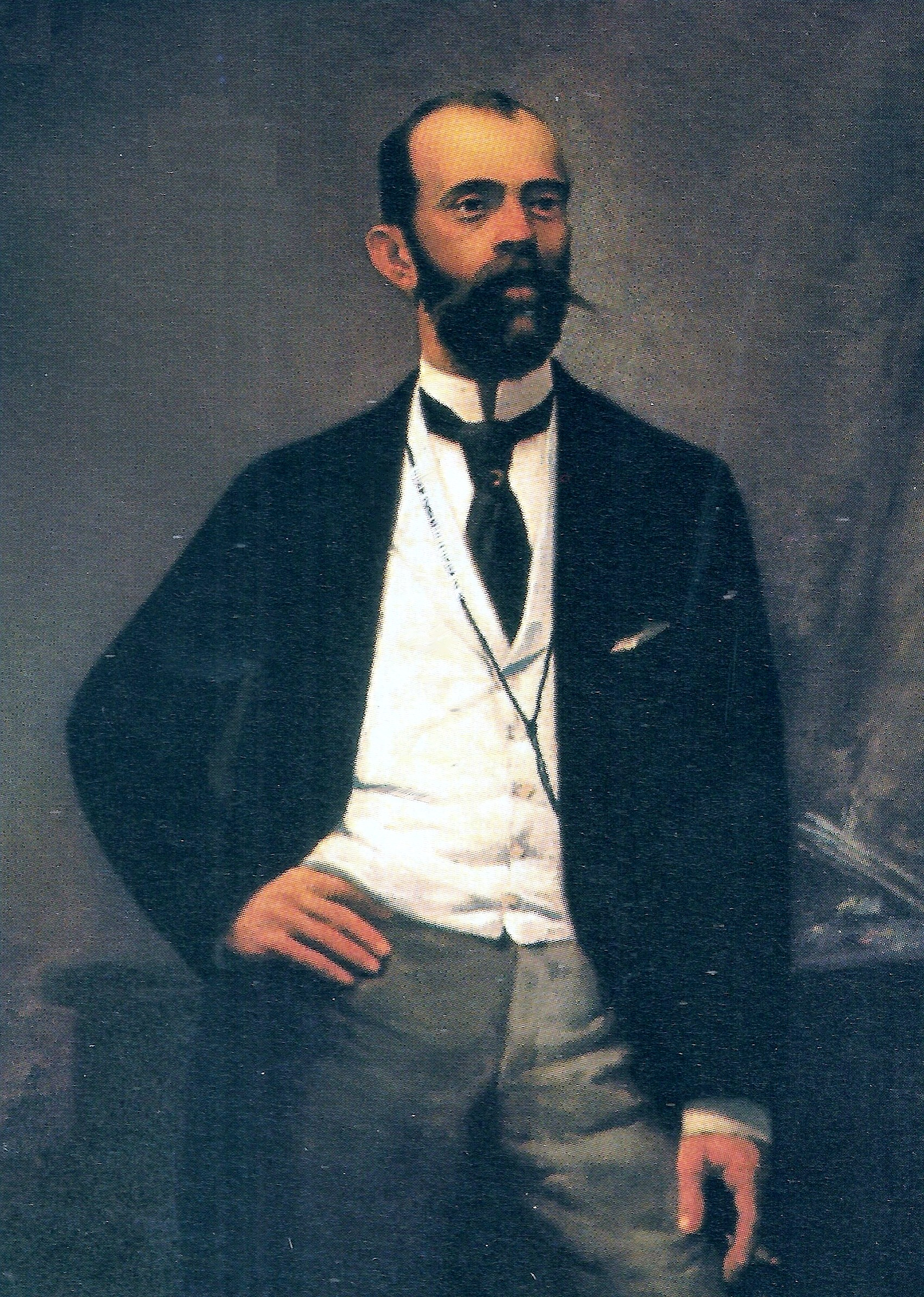
Self-portrait (1895)

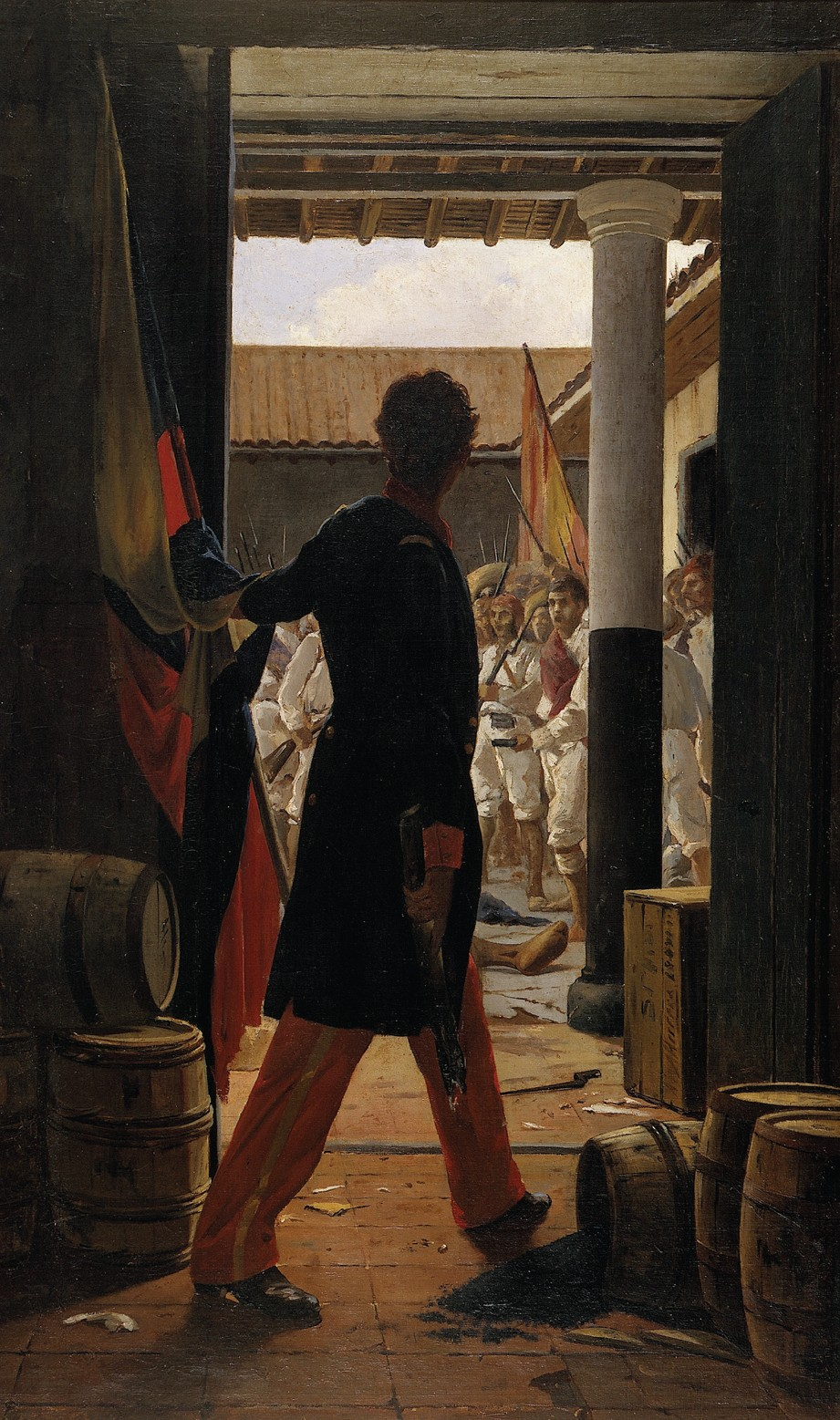
Ricaurte in San Mateo

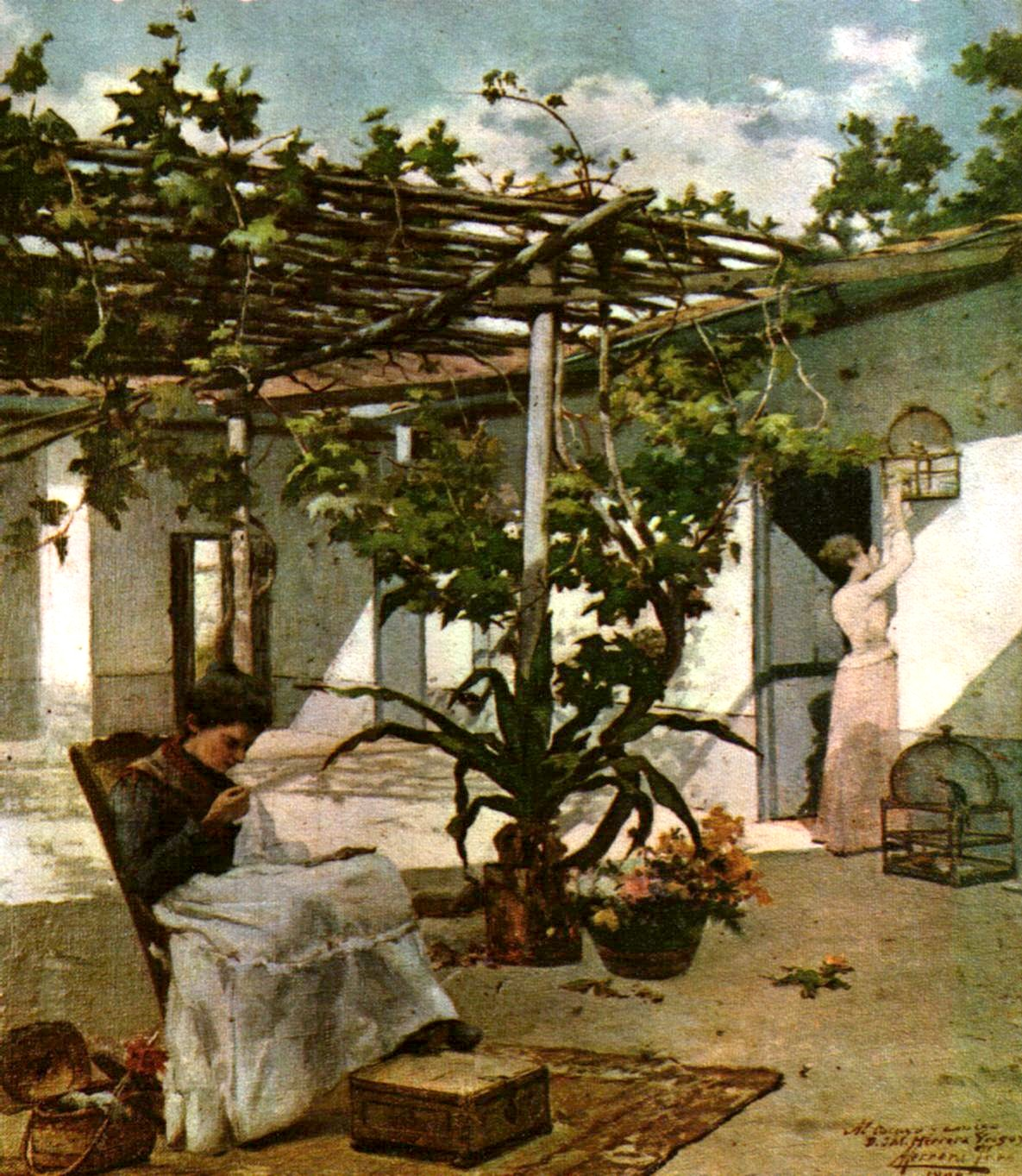
Patio Interior

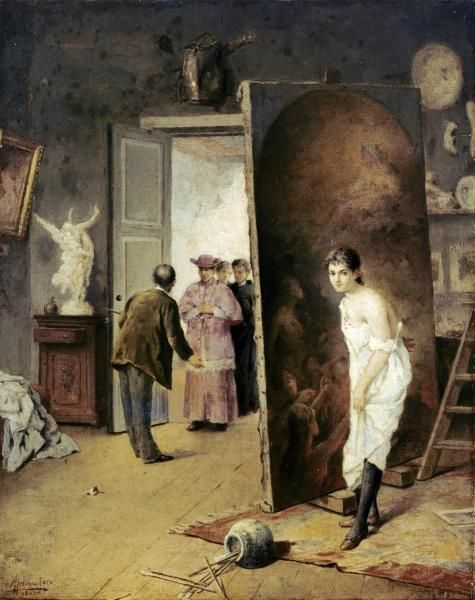
The Bishop
Visits his Studio

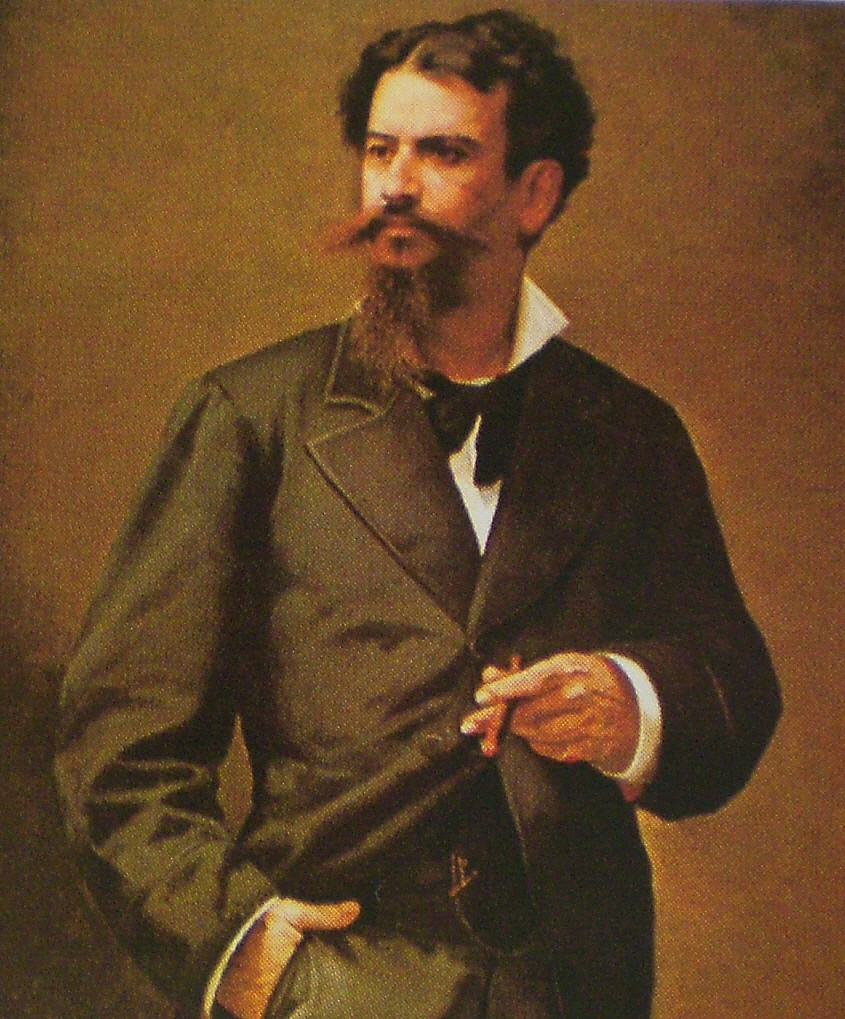
Portrait of
Eduardo Blanco
