= Diego Osorio y Villegas =

Venezuelan politician

Diego de Osorio y Villegas (1540 in Villasandino – 1601 in Santo Domingo) was a sixteenth-century governor of Venezuela Province (1589–1597), the Venezuela Province being a part of the Spanish Empire. He was governor at the time of the Preston Somers expedition, during which an English force found Caracas by way of a secret route through the mountains.

As Governor of Santo Domingo, he built a warehouse in La Guaira for distributing munitions along a chain of defenses. He granted amnesty to local elites accused of smuggling if they helped him combat smuggling in the region, placing patrols in ports to prevent the trade of contraband. This deal fell apart after Osorio Villegas died in office in 1601. He employed Simón de Bolívar y de la Rentería as a secretary. He gave his son, Simón de Bolívar y Castro, the hacienda later called El Ingenio, which stayed in the Bolívar family until the time of Simón Bolívar.

Previously, he spent 15 years fighting in the Dutch Revolt. He was the brother of Antonio Osorio y Villegas, who succeeded him as Governor of Santo Domingo.
