= Mantuano =

Members of the local elite born in Venezuela with Spanish ancestry

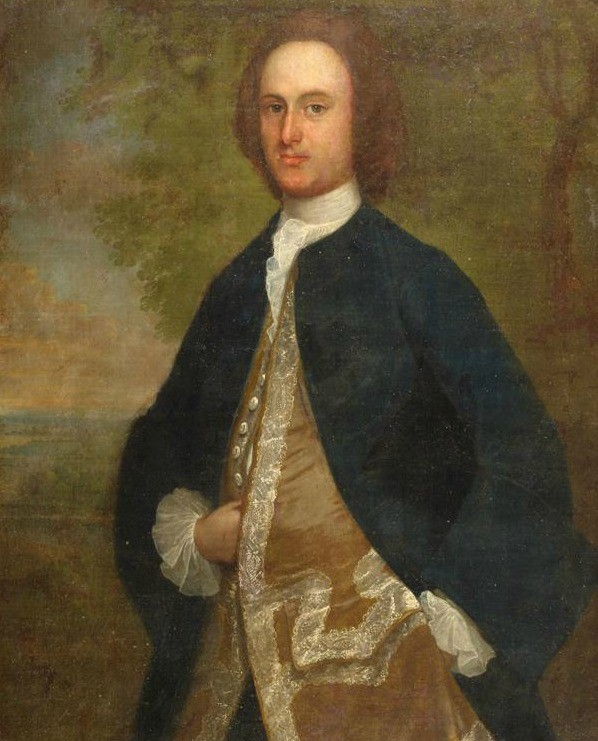
Juan Vicente Bolívar y Ponte, 18th century Mantuano.

Mantuano is a denomination assigned, first in Caracas and later in the rest of Venezuela, to the “blancos criollos” (Europeans born in Hispanic America) belonging to the local aristocracy. The term was in use from the 18th century until well into the 19th century. The mantuanos hardly surpassed a hundred heads of family by the end of the 18th century.

The mantuanos were also called "grandes cacaos", because they became rich with the cultivation and commercialization of cocoa. They were also called blancos criollos. The name blanco criollo only indicates that a person was born in America and was a descendant of Spaniards, while the word mantuano refers to members of the local elite. Other whites who also had the same birthplace and ancestry of Spanish origin, such as the blancos de orilla, were not part of the mantuano circle.

== Origin of the term ==
The first written appearance of the word mantuano occurred on January 5, 1752, in documents related to the insurrection of Juan Francisco de León, according to philologist Ángel Rosenblat. Mantuano derives from the word manto (mantilla), and was a reference to the exclusive use of this garment, to cover the head in religious services, by the ladies of the Caracas aristocrats. Since 1571 there was a provision in the Laws of the Indies that prohibited other women, such as mulattoes and black women, from wearing the mantle.

== Position of the Mantuano in colonial society ==
The emergence of the Mantuanos as a group dates back to the 16th century, as a consequence of the decrees, laws and ordinances that granted rights and privileges to the descendants of the first Spanish conquistadores and settlers in Venezuela. The Mantuanos became owners of large cocoa and tobacco plantations and cattle ranches. They also owned slaves. Some of the prerogatives of the Mantuanos were: pews assigned to them in the churches, to be carried in gestatorial chairs, use of the title of Don or Doña, to have their escutcheon placed in the front of their houses, use of canes, cloaks, chains, hats and sunshades.

Despite their economic power, the Mantuanos could only aspire to positions in the colonial cabildo, while other political positions were forbidden to them. Within the colonial caste system, the Mantuanos were below the Crown officials and other Spaniards residing in Venezuela (the so-called peninsular whites). As a consequence, there was a rivalry between the peninsular whites and the Mantuanos for political power in the colony. Among the main "Mantuano" families of Caracas were the Toro (Rodríguez del Toro), Tovar, Bolívar, Blanco, Herrera, Ibarra, Palacios, Mijares, Ponte, Ascanio, Berroterán or Pacheco. Some of these families were granted nobiliary titles by the Spanish Monarchy. These included the marquises of Toro, Mijares, Valle de Satiago, or Ustariz or the counts of Tovar, San Javier, or de la Granja.

The Mantuanos had conflicting relations with other social groups such as the white shore people and the pardos. The Mantuanos considered these groups as inferior. In their turn, the whites of the shore and the pardos felt antipathy towards the Mantuanos.

== Mantuanos in other areas of Venezuela ==
In Maracaibo, according to the author Kurt Nagel von Jess (in his works Algunas Familias Maracaiberas, 1969, and La Familia Lossada de Maracaibo, 2007) there were famous manor houses of Mantuano families such as the Lossada and Antúnez, located exactly behind the Cathedral and the Troconis, diagonal to it; all of them with their coats of arms carved in stone. There were also the Mantuano houses of the Casanova de Iturraspe, Cortez and Pineda, the Antúnez Pacheco, Ramírez Rus, Gutiérrez de Celis, Urdaneta, Andrade, Tubiñez Bocanegra, García de la Lastra, Pérez Luzardo, Padrón Del Villar and Osorio, among others. There were other Mantuano families of great zeal and ancestry in regions still known for their large haciendas: in Perijá (such as the García, Romero and de la Vega families, among others); in La Cañada (such as the Rincón, Boscán and Urdaneta families); and in the Andean region (such as the Picón, Casanova de Iturraspe, Lares and Febres Cordero families), with their large coffee and sugar cane plantations. In Falcón, specifically in the city of Coro and the Paraguaná peninsula, the solid mansions of the Garcés, De la Colina Peredo, García de Quevedo, and Fernández de Lugo families are still standing.

== Representation of the Mantuanos in Venezuelan Literature ==
- Las lanzas coloradas (1931): novel by Arturo Uslar Pietri. It is set in the historical period of the "War to the Death". The main characters are Fernando Fonta (a mantuano who owns a sugar cane plantation) and Presentación Campos (Fernando Fonta's butler).
- Los amos del valle (1979): novel by Francisco Herrera Luque narrating the history of Venezuela from the conquest of the Caracas Valley to the baptism of Simón Bolívar. The title of the work refers to the twenty Mantuanas families that ruled Caracas since the 17th century.

== See also ==
- La Blanquera
