= Juan Vicente Bolívar y Ponte =

Venezuelan creole elite man

Juan Vicente Bolívar
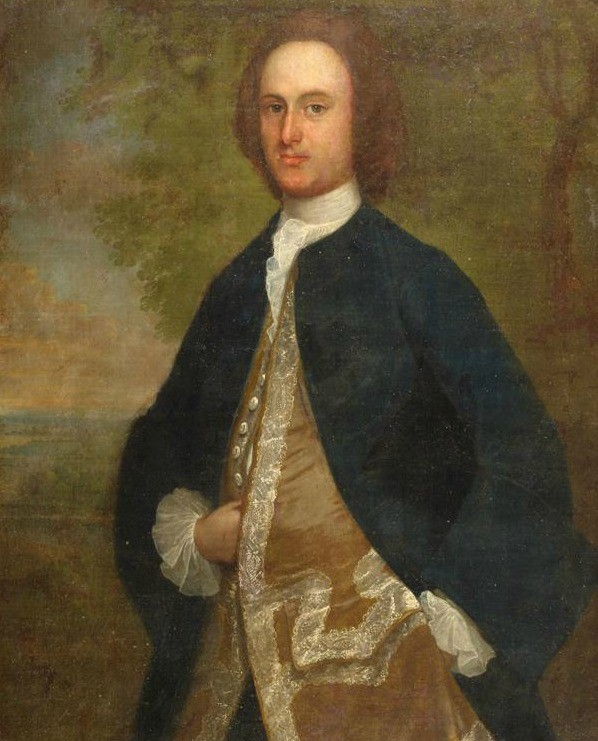
- A contemporary portrait
- Spouse: María de la Concepción Palacios y Blanco
- Children: Simón Bolívar; María Antonia Bolívar Palacios; Juan Vicente Bolívar Palacios
- Parent: Juan de Bolívar y Martínez de Villegas

Juan Vicente Bolívar y Ponte (15 October 1726 – 19 January 1786) was a Mantuano creole elite man in the Captaincy General of Venezuela and father of Simón Bolívar.

== Early life and career ==
Bolívar y Ponte was born 15 October 1726, the son of Juan Bolívar and Petronila Ponte. At the age of 16, he served with distinction during the Battle of La Guaira and Battle of Puerto Cabello under Gabriel de Zuloaga. He was elected attorney general of Caracas in 1747. He served in the court of Spain, returning after 5 years in 1759. For his return he was made lieutenant governor and judge of confiscations in La Victoria and San Mateo. He raised the local militia of the Aragua Valley and the Yaracuy River Rapid Company and was the colonel of the former. In 1765, he was appointed an administrator of the Real Hacienda.

In Spain, he engaged in a legal dispute over the pazo of Peñarredonda in Galicia, which he claimed was his birthright inheritance.

It is said he wrote the "Letter of the Mantuanos" letter to Francisco de Miranda with Martín Tovar and the Marquis of Mijares expressing discontent with Spanish rule, although the authenticity of this document has been doubted.

== Sexual abuse and marriage ==
His female slaves in his Aragua plantation complained of molestation to the Bishop of Caracas, Mariano Martí, during a pastoral visit, with married slaves saying that he sent their husbands away so he could better take advantage of them. The bishop advised them to avoid him, and he advised Bolívar y Ponte to get married as soon as possible. He married 14 year old María de la Concepción Palacios y Blanco in 1773. Together, the wealthy couple owned a dozen houses in Caracas and La Guaira, a hacienda in the Aragua valley, copper mines, a distillery, a textile export business ran by Francisco Carrasco, the Totumo cattle ranch, other plantations, and a side chapel in Caracas Cathedral.

In addition to likely several illegitimate children, he fathered Juan Vicente Bolívar Palacios (born 1781), María Antonia Bolívar Palacios (born 1777), Juana Nepomucena Bolívar Palacios (born 1779), and Simón Bolívar (born 1783).

== Death ==
Bolívar y Ponte died of tuberculosis on 19 January 1786. After the death of his son Juan Vicente in 1787, Simón became head of the family.

Although his father Juan de Bolívar y Martínez de Villegas used the title Marquis de San Luis, awarded by the crown for financially supporting Santa Maria de Montserrat Abbey, Juan Vicente never used it. María de la Concepción petitioned the crown in 1790 for the right to use it for their firstborn, but were unsuccessful because of a lack of surviving documents about the right.
