= Villasandino =

Coordinates: 42°22′N 4°06′W

- Municipality and town
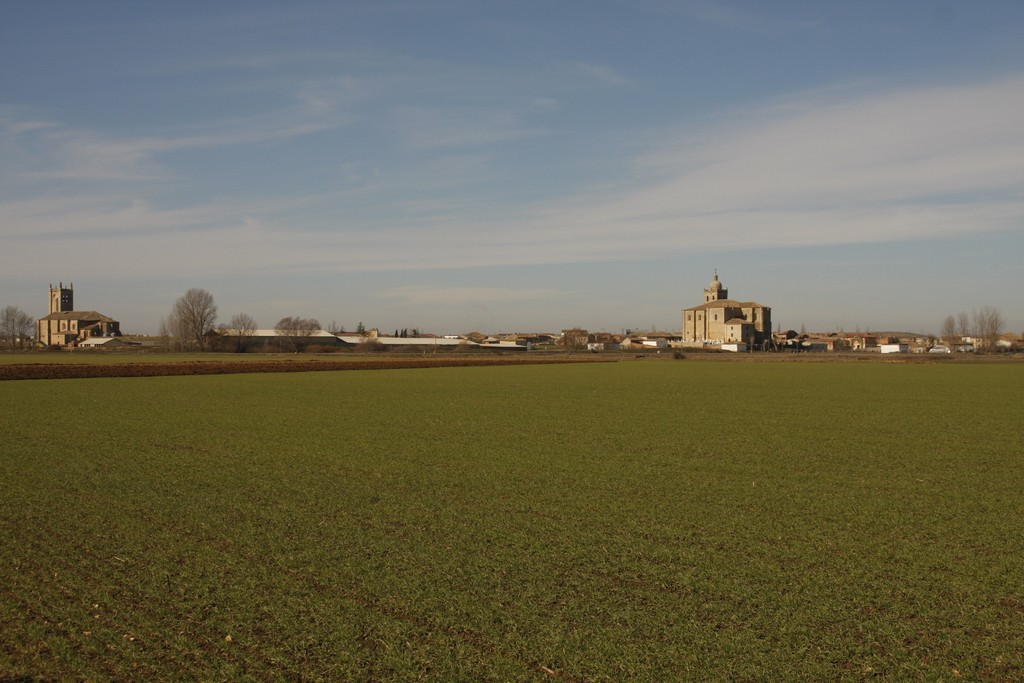
- View of Villasandino, 2010
- Interactive map of Villasandino
- Country: Spain
- Autonomous community: Castile and León
- Province: Burgos
- Comarca: Odra-Pisuerga

Area
  - Total: 43 km^{2} (17 sq mi)

Population (2025-01-01)
  - Total: 179
  - Density: 4.2/km^{2} (11/sq mi)
- Time zone: UTC+1 (CET)
  - Summer (DST): UTC+2 (CEST)
- Postal code: 09109
- Website: http://www.villasandino.es/

Villasandino is a municipality and town located in the province of Burgos, Castile and León, Spain. According to the 2004 census (INE), the municipality has a population of 240 inhabitants.

== People from Villasandino ==
- Diego Osorio Villegas (1540–1601): Soldier and Governor of Venezuela Province (1589–1597)
