= Francisco Herrera Luque =

Venezuelan writer, psychiatrist and diplomat

- Born: 14 December 1927; Caracas, Venezuela
- Died: 15 April 1991 (aged 63); Caracas, Venezuela
- Occupations: psychiatrist, writer, diplomat
- Writing career
- Period: 1961-1991
- Genres: Novel, history, short story, fable, essay
- Subject: History of Venezuela
- Notable work: "Los Amos del Valle" (1979)
- Literary movement: Historical Novel

Francisco José Herrera Luque (Caracas, 14 December 1927 – Caracas, 15 April, 1991) was a Venezuelan writer, psychiatrist and diplomat. He is the author of several well-known historical novels, including: Boves, el Urogallo (1972), Los Amos del Valle (1979) and La Luna de Fausto (1983).

He was the son of Francisco Herrera Guerrero and María Luisa Luque Carvallo. In 1956, he married Maria Margarita Terán Austria, with whom he had five children. Herrera Luque studied in the Central University of Venezuela (UCV) and later at the University of Salamanca (1952), where he obtained his title of physician. In Madrid he specialized in psychiatry, a field on which he wrote several scientific papers. His PhD thesis served as basis for his book: Los Viajeros de Indias (1961), about the psychopathic loads left on the Venezuelan population by the Spanish conquistadors. His interest in understanding the origins of the personalities of Latin America people took him to the study of heritage and genetics.

Herrera Luque founded the department of psychiatry of the UCV, becoming full professor. He was appointed ambassador of Venezuela in Mexico in the mid-1970s. As writer and novelist, his historical work is based on accurate and documented research. His late books: Los Cuatro reyes de la baraja, Bolívar en vivo, 1998 and El Vuelo del Alcatraz, were published posthumously.

During the final years of his life and after his death his works gained great popularity, making him one of the best-selling writers of Venezuela. His success resulted from the combination of typical Venezuelan stories with historical facts; in his works, Herrera Luque looked beyond the official history of the country and created a parallel narrative to it. Francisco Herrera Luque died in Caracas from a heart attack on 15 April 1991.

In 1992 the Francisco Herrera Luque Foundation was created.

In 2010 the novel Boves, el Urogallo, was adapted into a film by director Luis Alberto Lamata, with the title of Taita Boves.

== Bibliography ==
- Los Viajeros de Indias (1961)
- La Huella Perenne (1969)
- Las Personalidades Psicopáticas (1969)
- Boves, el Urogallo (1972)
- En la Casa del Pez que Escupe el Agua (1975)
- Los amos del Valle (1979)
- La Historia Fabulada (volumes I, II, III) (1981-1983)
- Bolívar de Carne y Hueso y otros Ensayos (1983)
- La Luna de Fausto (1983)
- Manuel Piar, Caudillo de Dos Colores (1987)
- Los Cuatro Reyes de la Baraja (1991)
- 1998 (1992)
- Bolívar en Vivo (1997)
- El Vuelo del Alcatraz (2001)

== See also ==
- Venezuela
- Los Amos del Valle
- List of Venezuelan writers
