= Emilio Jacinto Mauri =

Venezuelan painter (1855–1908)

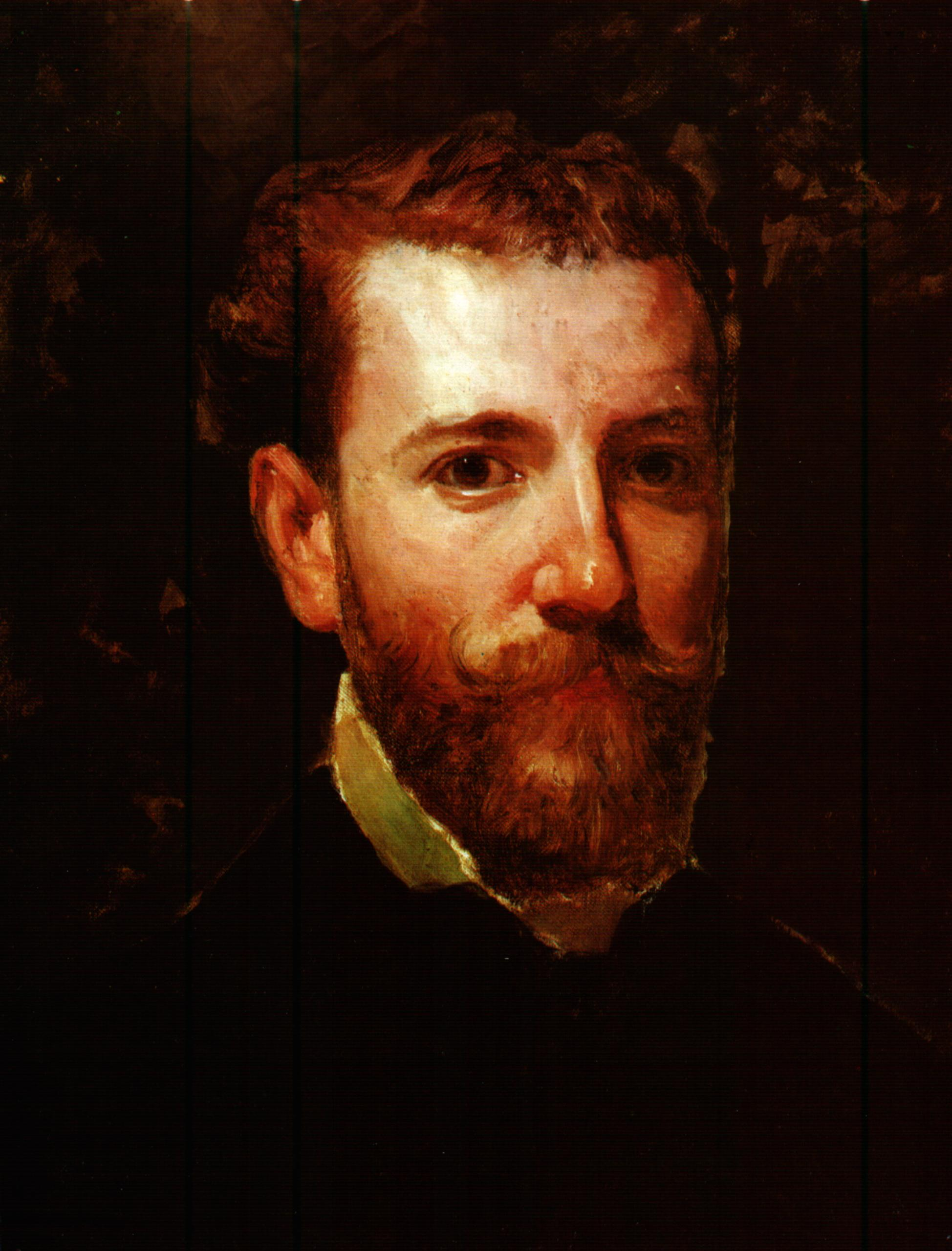
Self-portrait (1887)

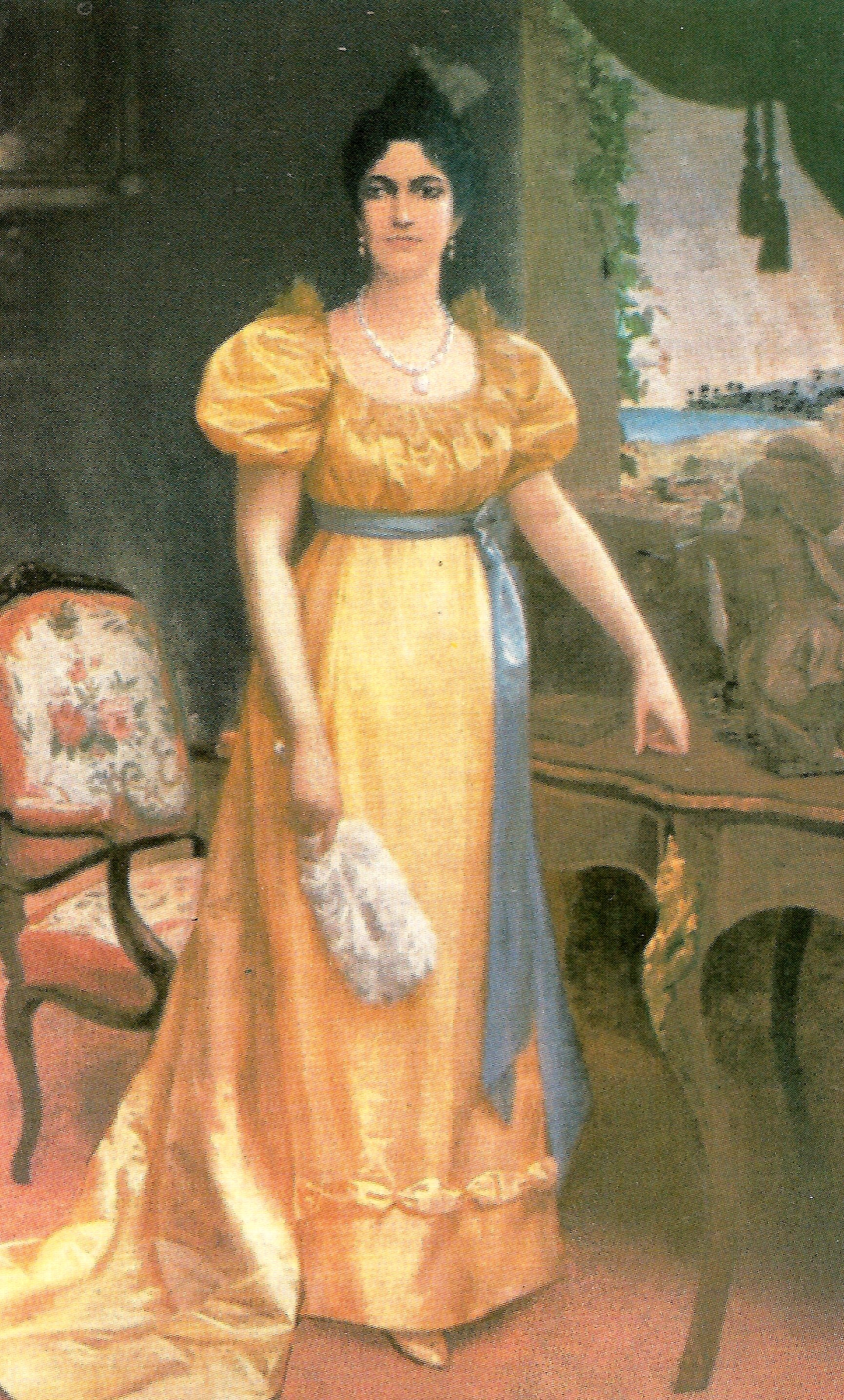
Luisa Cáceres de Arismendi

Emilio Jacinto Mauri Ivern (9 March 1855, La Guaira - 18 February 1908, Caracas) was a Venezuelan painter who specialized in portraits; mostly of an historical nature.

== Biography ==
His father was Spanish and his mother was French. After 1861, his family lived in Nantes, where he began his education at the local Jesuit school. He originally planned to pursue a career in medicine and worked at the hospital there, but eventually decided to devote himself to painting instead.

When he came of legal age, he moved to Paris and enrolled at the École des Beaux-Arts, where he studied with Jean-Léon Gérôme, then transferred to the Académie Julian to study with Jean-Paul Laurens. He also received private lessons in the workshop of Jacques Clément Wagrez.

During this time, he received "Honorable Mention" for an exhibition at the Salon. Later, he received a commission from the Ministry of Public Instruction to restore the frescos at the palace of the Marquis de Saint Paul.

In 1874, upon the invitation of President Antonio Guzmán Blanco, he returned to the country of his birth to participate in ongoing cultural reforms. In 1883, he exhibited at the "Exposición Nacional de Venezuela", celebrating the 100th anniversary of the birth of Simón Bolívar, winning a bronze medal. In 1884, as the result of his work in Paris, he was commissioned to do restoration at the "Church of Our Lady Of Mercy" in Caracas.

Three years later, he was named the first Director of the new "Academia Nacional de Bellas Artes de Caracas", modelled after its French counterpart. He held that position until his death. In 1893, he showed several canvases at the World Columbian Exposition in Chicago.

His best-known portrait is probably that of Luisa Cáceres de Arismendi, painted in 1899 on the occasion of her 100th birth anniversary. It is currently on display at the Palacio Federal Legislativo and has been used on several Venezuelan postage stamps and banknotes. Other familiar portraits include those of Generals Francisco de Miranda and Joaquín Crespo.
