= Ricaurte Municipality =

Ricaurte Municipality Municipio Ricaurte
- Municipality
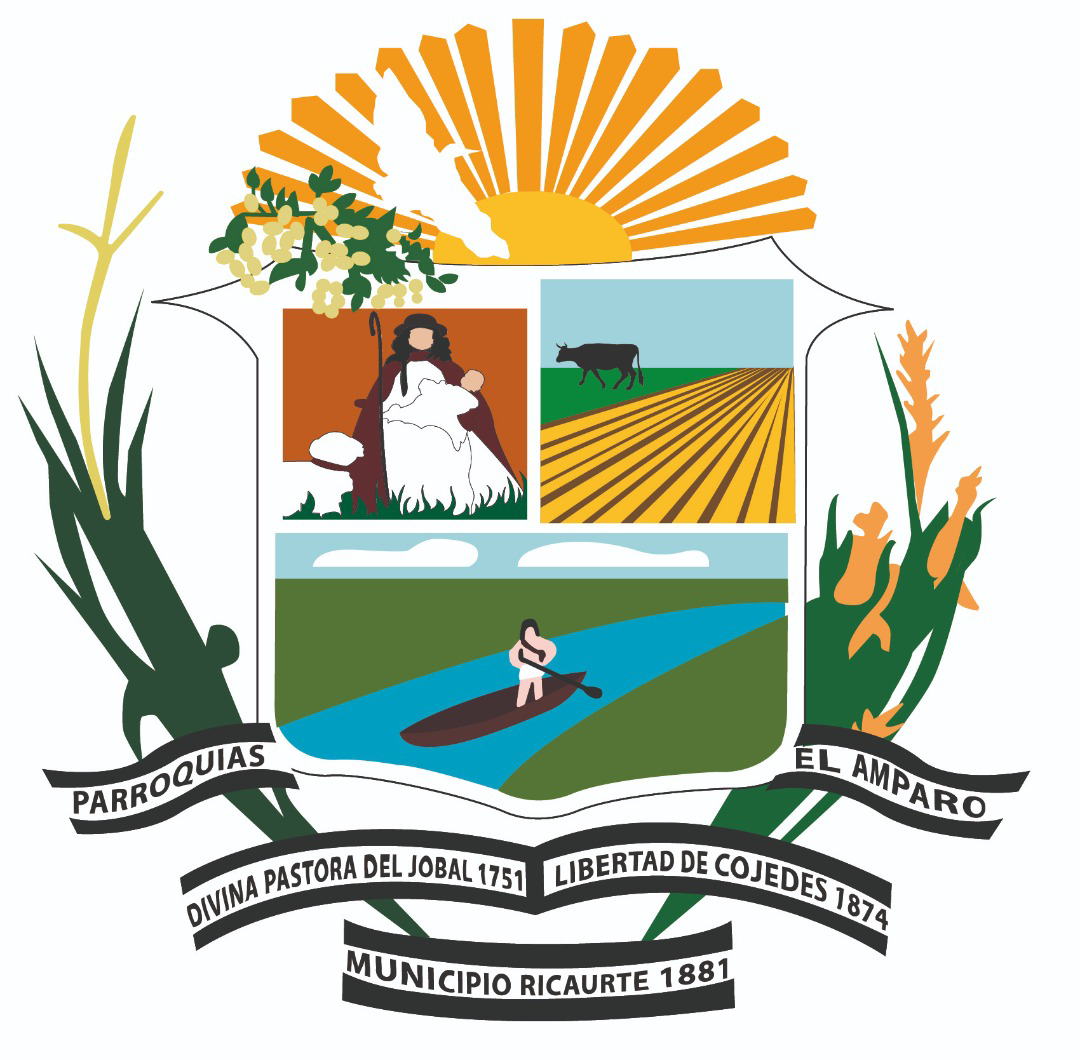
- Flag Coat of arms

- Location in Cojedes

- Location in Venezuela
- Coordinates: 9°17′16″N 68°39′05″W
- Country: Venezuela
- State: Cojedes
- Municipal seat: Libertad de Cojedes[*]

Government
  - Mayor: José Páez Oropeza (VVC)

Area
  - Total: 754.5 km^{2} (291.3 sq mi)

Population (2011)
  - Total: 12,657
  - Density: 16.78/km^{2} (43.45/sq mi)
- Time zone: UTC−4 (VET)
- Area code(s): 0258
- Website: Official website

The Ricaurte Municipality is one of the nine municipalities (municipios) that makes up the Venezuelan state of Cojedes and, according to the 2011 census by the National Institute of Statistics of Venezuela, the municipality has a population of 12,657. The town of Libertad is the municipal seat of the Ricaurte Municipality. The municipality is named for Venezuelan independence hero Antonio Ricaurte.

== Demographics ==
The Ricaurte Municipality, according to a 2007 population estimate by the National Institute of Statistics of Venezuela, has a population of 12,340 (up from 10,883 in 2000). This amounts to 4.1% of the state's population. The municipality's population density is 13.64 inhabitants per square kilometre (35.3/sq mi).

== Government ==
The mayor of the Ricaurte Municipality is Ramón A Peralta Ruíz, elected on October 31, 2004, with 54% of the vote. He replaced Violeta Montoya shortly after the elections. The municipality is divided into two parishes; Libertad de Cojedes and El Amparo.
