= Antonio Ricaurte =

Colombian revolutionary (1786–1814)

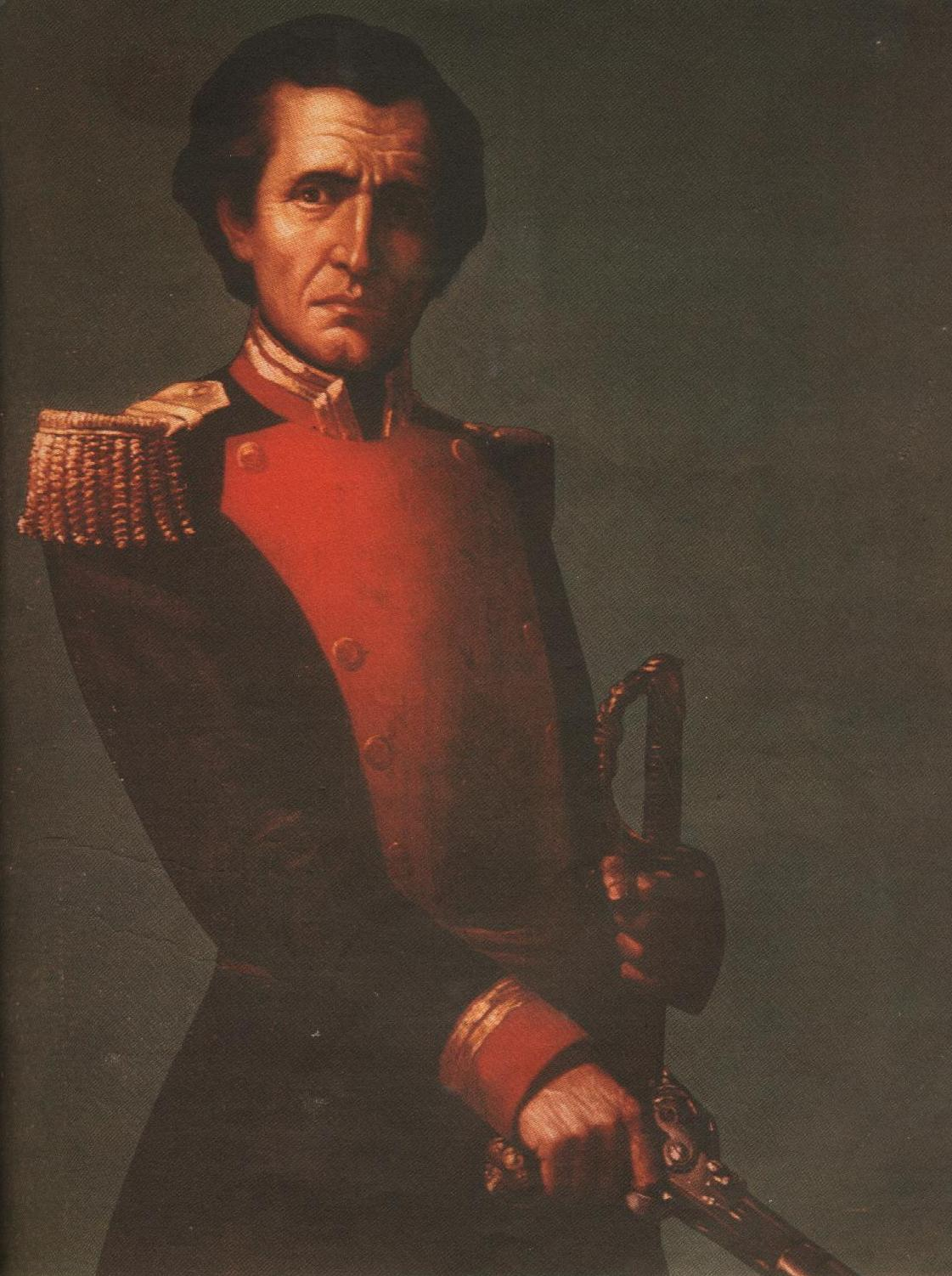
- Born: June 10, 1786; Villa de Leyva, Boyacá; Viceroyalty of New Granada
- Died: March 25, 1814 (aged 27); San Mateo, Aragua; Venezuela
- Military career
- Allegiance: Army of the Patriots of New Granada
- Service years: 1810-1814
- Rank: Captain
- Nickname: El Chispero (the spark lighter)
- Conflicts: Alto de la Virgen (December 2, 1812); San Victorino (January 9, 1813); La Grita (April 13, 1813); Carache (June 19, 1813); Niquitao (July 2, 1813); Taguanes (July 31, 1813); San Mateo (March 25, 1814)

Antonio Clemente José María Bernabé Ricaurte Lozano (June 10, 1786 – March 25, 1814) was a patriot of the Independence of Colombia and Venezuela and captain of Bolívar's army. He is remembered as the martyr of the Battle of San Mateo, where, in a heroic action, he blasted an enemy stronghold by immolating himself.

== Early life ==
Antonio Ricaurte was born into a family with a military tradition. He was the son of Esteban Ricaurte and María Clemencia Lozano, who was the daughter of Jorge Lozano de Peralta, Marquis of San Jorge, renowned collaborator of the Revolt of the Comuneros of 1781 against the rule of the Spanish Crown.

He studied at the San Bartolomé School in Bogotá between 1799 and 1804, and later married Juana Martínez Camacho, niece of patriot Joaquín Camacho, who mentored him into the colonial bureaucracy and through whose influence Ricaurte was appointed chamber scribe and secretary of the Accounts Tribunal of the Viceroyalty of Nueva Granada.

== Early military career ==
He participated in the revolutionary acts of July 20, 1810, in Bogotá, as a rebel against the colonial regime; for his bold performance, his comrades gave him the nickname El Chispero ("the spark lighter"). The commanders of the revolution entrusted him with the mission of keeping watch over the Viceroy Antonio Amat y Borbón at the Accounts Tribunal. When the patriot militias were organized, Ricaurte was incorporated to the infantry battalion of the National Guard, with the rank of lieutenant.

During the first years of the United Provinces of New Granada, when a division between centralists and federalists occurred, Ricaurte supported Antonio Nariño and the centralists and fought on their side in the first civil war of New Granada. He fought the battle of Alto de la Virgen in Ventaquemada, where his troops were defeated on December 2, 1812. Subsequently, on January 9, 1813, he participated in the battle of San Victorino in Santafé, which gave the triumph to the centralists.

== War of Independence ==
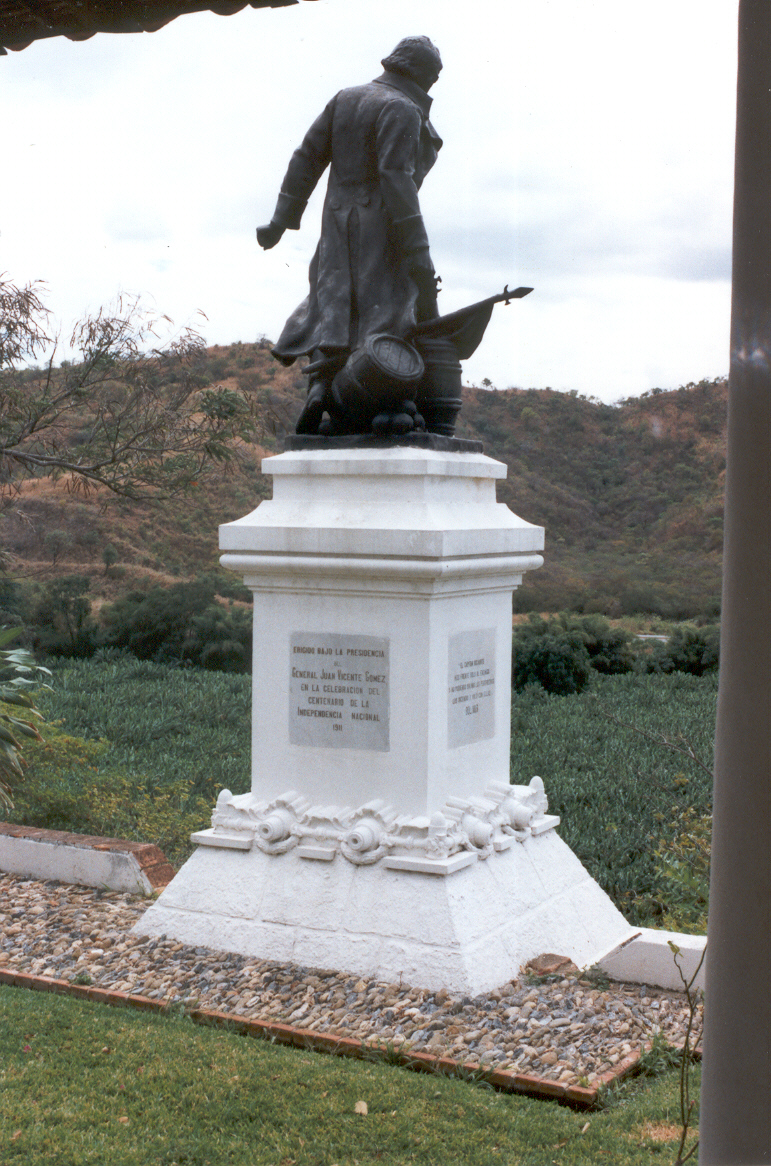
Statue of Antonio Ricaurte by sculptor Lorenzo González in San Mateo, Venezuela. This statue depicts Captain Ricaurte at the moment in which he immolates himself by lighting a barrel of gunpowder. It was erected at the site of the battle during the centenary celebration of the independence of Venezuela.

In 1813 he was recruited in the army of New Granada under the then brigadier Simón Bolívar, to fight for the liberty of Venezuela, in what is known as the "Admirable Campaign." In this first "Liberating Army," he fought at the battles of La Grita (April 13), Carache (June 19), Niquitao (July 2), and Taguanes (July 31) among others.

=== Battle of San Mateo ===
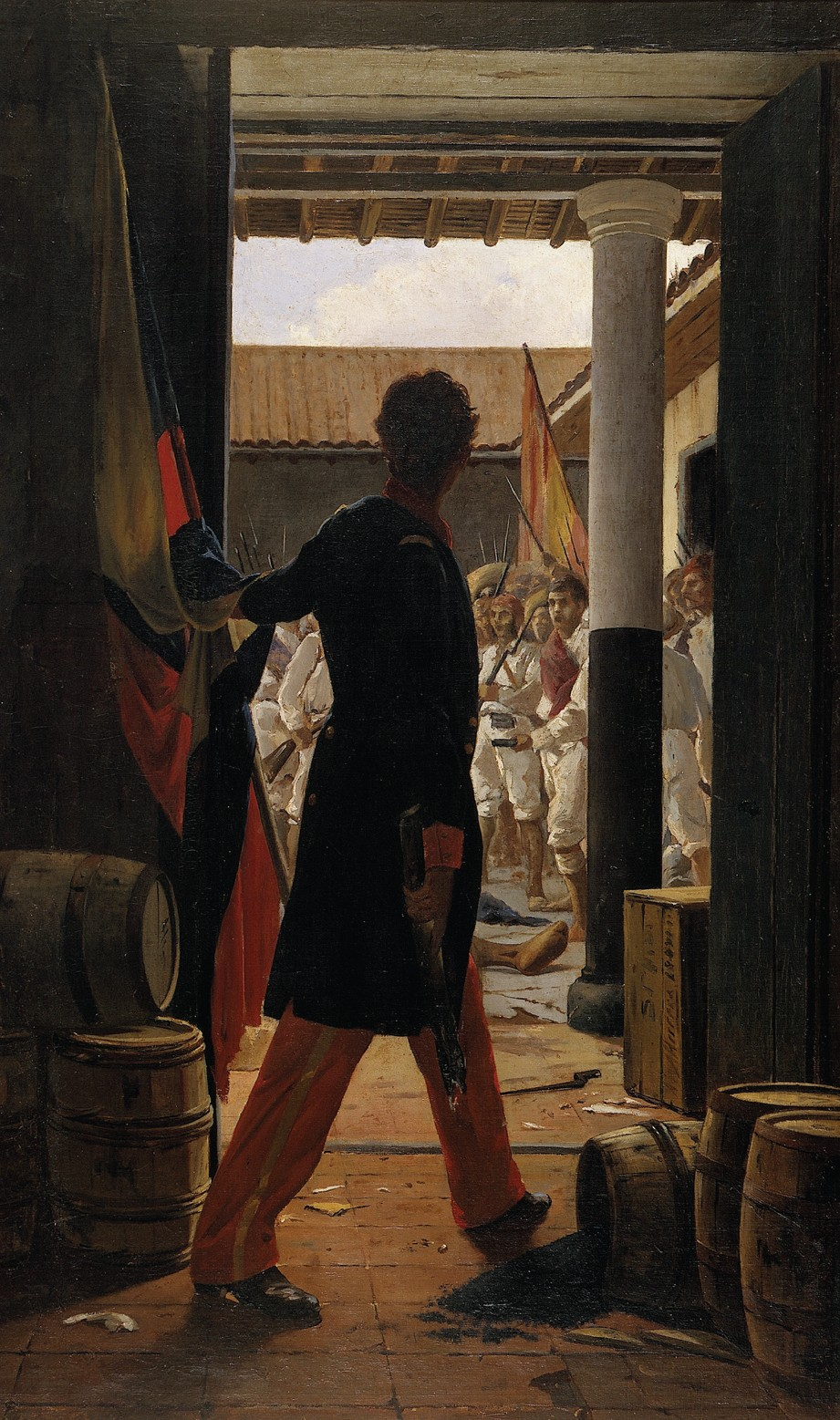
Ricaurte en San Mateo, painting by Antonio Herrera Toro

In 1814 a series of battles between patriots and royalists took place in a region called Valles de Aragua (Valleys of Aragua), in what is now Venezuela. The main house of the San Mateo estate, property of Simón Bolívar, was placed under the custody of Ricaurte and a small troop of fifty soldiers. During the royalists' attack, the army under the royalists' Second Commander Francisco Tomás Morales took hold of most of the estate, including the main house, which was used as the principal ammunition depot.

Realizing how the battle of San Mateo would be lost if the main house remained in the hands of the royalists, Captain Ricaurte ordered his men to leave and lit a barrel of gunpowder inside one of the ammunition storage facilities of the main house, thus killing himself and a large number of the royalist troops who were readily occupying the precincts. During the momentary disorder which followed the explosion, Bolívar seized the opportunity and launched an attack to regain control of the main house and later the whole of the estate.

The Battle of San Mateo ended with the resounding triumph of the patriots' army. It was later estimated the royalists lost more than ten times as many soldiers as the patriots during the battle.

== Legacy ==
Antonio Ricaurte was a fervent freemason and to date the Lodge of Zulia State, Venezuela, is named in his honor. Ricaurte Municipality in Cojedes is named for him.

Captain Ricaurte's heroic action is also remembered in the last verse of Colombia's National Anthem:

Spanish:
Ricaurte en San Mateo,
en átomos volando,
"Deber antes que vida,"
con llamas escribió.

Translation:

English:
Ricaurte in San Mateo,
in atoms flying,
"Duty before life,"
with flames he wrote.
