= San Mateo, Aragua =

San Mateo
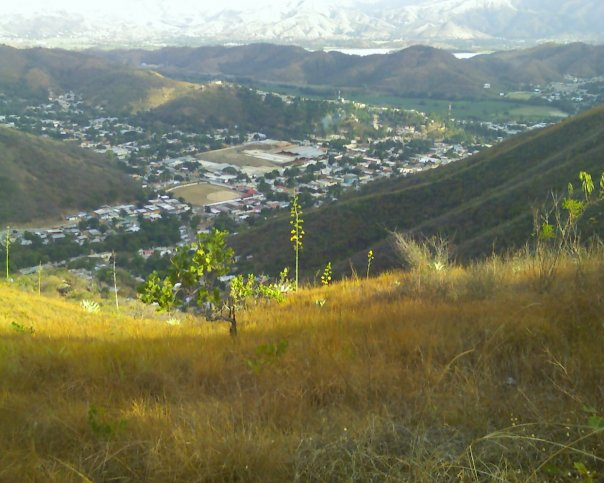

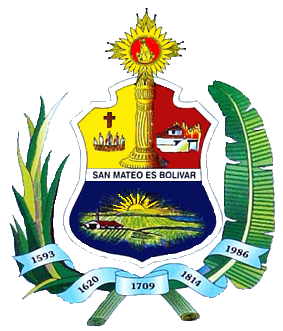
- Flag Coat of arms

- Location within Venezuela
- Coordinates: 10°12′48″N 67°25′21″W
- Country: Venezuela
- State: Aragua
- Municipality: Bolívar Municipality
- Founded: 30 November 1620
- Elevation: 517 m (1,696 ft)

Population (2001)
  - Total: 38,062
  - Demonym: Sanmateano/a
- Time zone: UTC−4 (VET)
- Postal code: 2110
- Area code: 0244
- Website: Municipal website

San Mateo is a city in the state of Aragua in Venezuela. It is the administrative seat of Bolívar Municipality. It was founded on 30 November 1620.

San Mateo is the site of a former cane sugar mill owned by the Bolívar family called Ingenio Bolívar, now a museum.

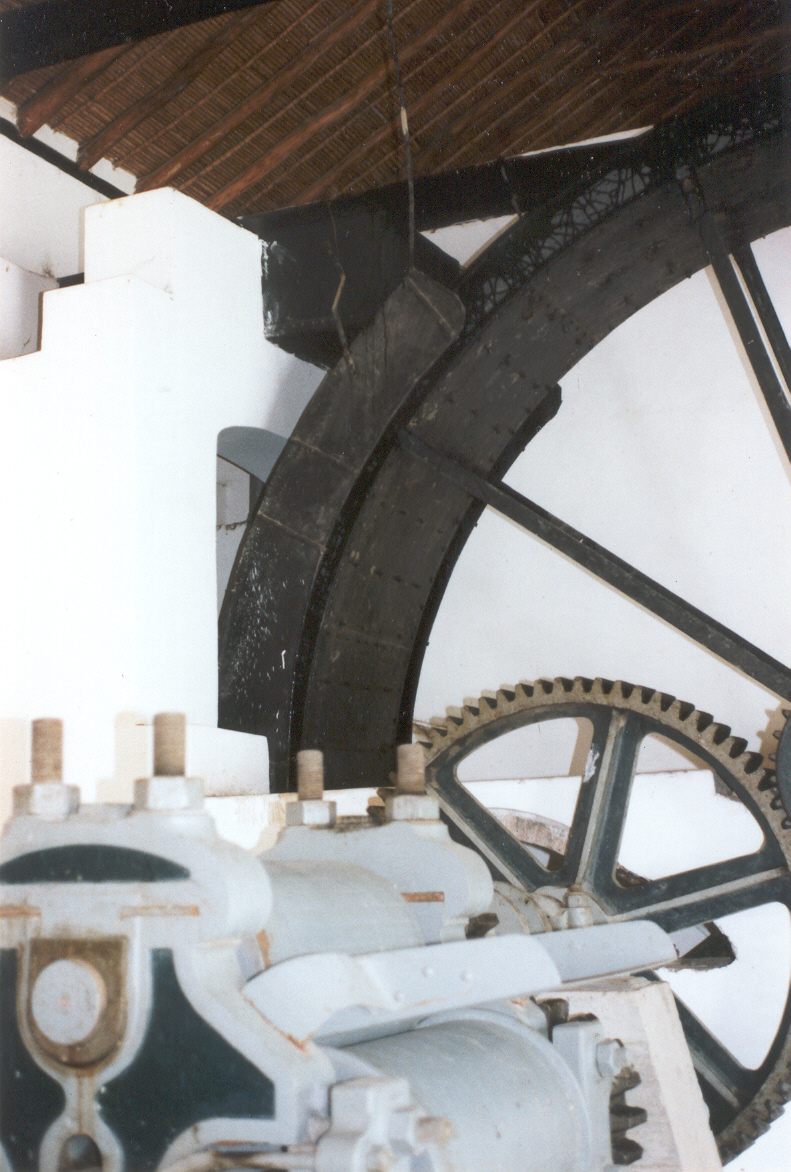
The sugar cane mill mechanism in Ingenio Bolívar.

== See also ==
- List of cities and towns in Venezuela
