= Antonio Obando =

Colombian military officer and politician

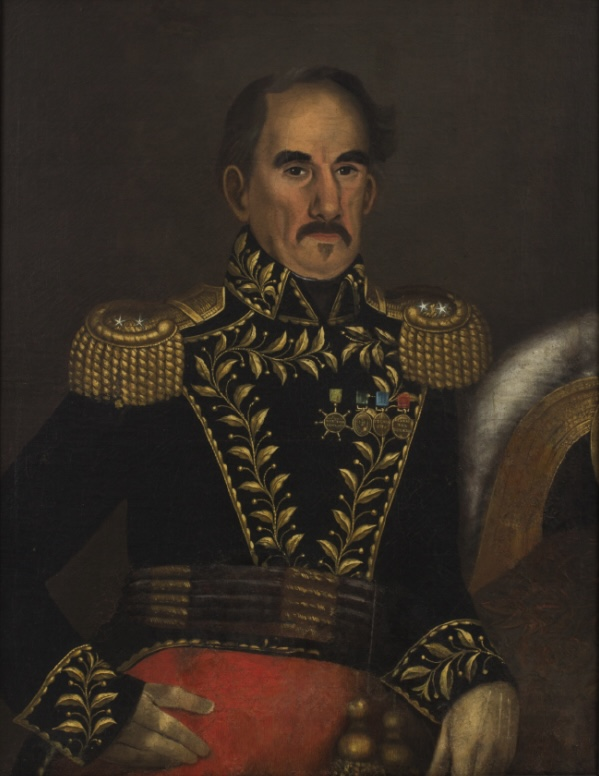
- Oil painting portrait of Obando by José María Espinosa circa 1850. Museo de la Independencia-Casa del Florero

Secretary of War and Navy of New Granada
- In office 1833–1837
- President: Francisco de Paula Santander
- Preceded by: José Hilario López
- Succeeded by: José Hilario López

Personal details
- Born: Antonio Obando Salazar; 15 January 1788 Simacota, Socorro Province, Viceroyalty of New Granada, Spanish Empire
- Died: 30 December 1849 (aged 61) Tocaima, Republic of New Granada
- Spouse: Eulalia Almeida

Military service
- Allegiance: United Provinces of New Granada; Gran Colombia; Republic of New Granada
- Branch/service: army
- Rank: General
- Commands: 1st line of New Granada battalion,
- Battles/wars: Nariño's Southern Campaign; Bolívar's campaign to liberate New Granada; Pasto Campaign

Antonio Obando Salazar (15 January 1788 – 30 December 1849) was a Colombian military officer and politician who fought in the Colombian War of Independence and later served as Secretary of War and Navy during the presidency of Francisco de Paula Santander and was also commander of the New Granadan Army.

Born in the town of Simacota, in the Socorro Province in the Viceroyalty of New Granada, Obando joined the New Granadan independence movement upon the revolt of July 20, 1810 enlisting in the Patriot army. He would later participate in Nariño's Southern Campaign in 1814 fighting in many of its battles and was promoted to captain. He also fought at the Battle of the Palo River in 1815 and was captured by the Spanish at the Patriot defeat at the Battle of Cuchilla del Tambo in 1816. He narrowly avoided execution by the Spanish and was instead forced to serve in the Spanish army, serving for two years until he managed to escape when his unit was stationed in Venezuela joining the Patriot army of General Simón Bolívar fighting in his campaigns against the Spanish in Venezuela. Obando was one of the officers that accompanied General Francisco de Paula Santander when he was sent by Bolivar to Casanare to build an army for the upcoming New Granadan campaign of 1819. Obando was an infantry battalion commander during the campaign and fought in all of the battles in that campaign that allowed for the liberation of much of New Granada where he was promoted to Colonel.

He then fought in the Southern campaigns of 1820–24 against royalist forces and guerillas where he suffered a series of military defeats that brought sharp criticism from Bolivar. Despite this he continued his military career serving in a variety posts, he was a fervent supporter of Vice-president Santander and the 1821 constitution that Bolivar attempted to do away with.

After the dissolution of Gran Colombia, Obando remained in the military, when Santander returned and was elected President of New Granada he was made part of his cabinet serving as his Secretary of War and Navy during his entire term. After the end of Santander's presidency he was made commander of the army in 1837 but resigned from his post a year later.

After resigning from his post he retired from public life and lived on his farm in Tocaima where he later wrote his autobiography. Obando died on 30 December 1849, and received full military honors.

== Early life ==
Antonio Obando Salazar was born on 15 January 1788, in Simacota, which is currently in the Department of Santander, Colombia, at that time it was part of the Province of Socorro, in the Viceroyalty of New Granada, the son of Julián Obando Aparicio and Isabel Salazar Losada y Sarmiento. There he learned to read and write and would later be sent to provincial capital of Socorro to attend grammar school.

Obando was studying at the Colegio Mayor de Nuestra Señora del Rosario in Santa Fe de Bogotá when the events of 20 July 1810 took place. Together with the priest Juan Nepomuceno Azuero he joined the crowd that gathered in the Plaza Mayor to demand the creation of a junta so that the demands of the people could be heard.

== Military career ==
After the events of 20 July 1810, Obando subsequently abandoned his studies and enlisted in the Patriot army, where he was part of the "Militias of Cundinamarca" Battalion reaching the rank of lieutenant by 1812, his unit was part of the troops of General Antonio Nariño, and participated in the Southern Campaign (1813–1814). He fought in the battles of the Alto Palacé and Calibío where he was promoted to captain, as well as Juanambú and Tacines.

After the Patriot defeat the Battle of Ejidos de Pasto in December 1814, which led to the capture of General Nariño, Colonel José María Cabal took what was left of the battered Patriot army and retreated to Popayán and fearing a royalist counteroffensive eventually fell back towards Cali in the Cauca Valley. On 15 April 1815, Obando was promoted to Lieutenant Colonel and 3 months later took part in the Battle of the Palo River, his cavalry squadron was placed on the Patriot right flank, he participated in the decisive bayonet charge that decided the battle and defeated the Spanish offensive that aimed to capture the Cauca valley and forced them to retreat back to Pasto allowing the patriots to recapture Popayán. However by August 1815 General Pablo Morillo and the Spanish expeditionary army arrived on the Caribbean coast of New Granada and laid siege to Cartagena de Indias while also deploying forces to invade the interior of the country, the government in Santa Fe transferred many of the battalions of the army of the south which weakened the army.

By 1816 Obando was still in the army of the south and garrisoned in Popayán, with the Spanish reconquest in full swing now with Spanish forces bearing down from the north and renewed offensive led by Brigadier Juan de Sámano marching from Pasto. The small patriot army in Popayán now under Colonel Liborio Mejia attempted to do battle with them meeting Sámano's forces west of Popayán but were defeated at the Battle of Cuchilla del Tambo, Obando along with some other officers managed to escape capture and skirmished with the Spanish at La Plata in July 1816 but were captured.

Despite being an officer (which usually meant summary execution by the Spanish) Obando was spared execution and was subsequently forced to serve in the Spanish Army as part of the 3rd Battalion of Numancia which were deployed to Venezuela to fight against Simón Bolívar's forces in 1817. When his battalion was stationed in Merida, Obando successfully deserted his unit and joined the Patriot forces in the llanos of Venezuela that were under the command of José Antonio Páez.

=== New Granada Campaign of 1819 ===
By mid-1818, Bolívar sought a shift in his strategy after his last two campaigns had failed to liberate Venezuela from Spanish control and began to devise a military operation to liberate New Granada. However a new army would need be to raised as his forces had been weakened as a result of the last two campaigns, thus he appointed then Colonel Francisco de Paula Santander as commander of the vanguard of the Liberator Army and promoted him to brigadier general tasking him with raising forces in the province of Casanare and provided him with 1,200 muskets, Obando along with Lt. Colonel Jacinto Lara, Sgt. Major Joaquín París, and Captain Vicente González were selected to accompany and help Santander in his task. After a few months by February 1819 Santander had managed to impose his authority over the caudillos of the Casanare province and was able to transform the old guerrillas of the area into a force of about 1,200 regular men divided into 2 infantry battalions and a cavalry squadron. One of these battalions would be the line infantry battalion "First of the Line of New Granada" with Obando placed as its commander. In addition to being commander of the First of the Line of New Granada, Obando was also a member of the permanent war council established by General Santander on 24 February 1819 to maintain order and discipline within his forces cantoned in Casanare.

While preparations for the campaign were still continuing, at the end of March and the beginning of April, Colonel José María Barreiro, commander of the III division of the royalist army garrisoned in the highlands of the Altiplano Cundiboyacense, invaded the Casanare provinces under orders by General Morillo in an attempt to destroy Santander's forces. This campaign would be a resounding failure for the Spanish who, due to desertion and lack of supplies, could not continue the campaign as Santander intelligently withdrew to the vast interior of the plains avoiding combat with the Spanish. With the coming arrival of the rainy season, by late April Barreiro decided to withdraw his army back across the Andes, however he left some detachments to protect the mountain passages of the Cordillera Oriental such as the one placed in Salina de Chita which were composed of two companies from the "King's 1st" infantry battalion. Obando was ordered by Santander to harass and attack these forces, thus Obando set out with two companies, one from his battalion and the other from the "Cazadores" battalion and managed to take the town on 23 April, capturing the garrison there and its war material. The royalist prisoners were incorporated into the Patriot army. Among the captured material that was found were muskets, ammunition, rations, as well as uniforms among which was an officer's jacket lined with fur cloth that Obando decided to donate to General Santander, Santander would use this jacket during the entirety of the campaign and would also wear it in his entrance to Bogotá on 10 August 1819.

By late May with Barreiro's forces retreated back across the Andes, Santander informed Bolívar of the favorability of starting the campaign. Bolívar agreed, and began his march from the town of Mantecal in the Llanos of Venezuela in late May and arrived in Tame on 12 June where his army joined up with Santander's army, the following days would see Bolívar organize the army. Whilst in Tame, Santander submitted a number of requests for promotions of his officers to Bolívar, which were denied, something that caused animosity from Obando towards Bolívar. The "Liberator army of New Granada and Venezuela" soon departed Tame for the Andes, Obando took part in the Battle of Paya on 27 June when the vanguard encountered a 300-strong Spanish garrison at Paya, after a few hours of combat the Spanish retreated clearing the way for the army to begin their crossing of the Andes.

Obando was also one of the officers that expressed their desire to continue the campaign when Bolívar considered cancelling the operation when his Venezuelan soldiers were on the verge of mutiny. In his autobiography he stated

From the top of Moscote I got off my mule, I laid on my back on the green weed, and with my feet I made the cross to the Llanos and swore not to return to them out of my own liking, but tied up. That if General Bolívar withdraws, I am determined to go with my Battalion, disperse it into guerrillas and thus make war on the Spaniards.

With the backing of these officers Bolívar was able to continue the campaign, and was inspired by the dedication and the will of his officers to continue. In early July the army crossed the Andes through the Parámo de Pisba, an extremely difficult crossing which saw the army lose many men. After crossing the Andes the army entered into combat between the days July 10–11 engaging the Spanish at Corrales and Gámeza. At the Battle of Gámeza on 11 July, Obando was wounded when his battalion along with the Cazadores battalion attempted to take the Gámeza bridge but were rebuffed by the Spanish firepower, the battle ended indecisively for both sides, for his actions Obando was finally given his promotion to full colonel.

Obando and the First of the Line battalion would again see action on 25 July at the Battle of Vargas Swamp near the town of Paipa. Obando's battalion were initially kept in the reserve but were deployed to support the assault in the center on Cangrejo hill. Obando would write that their victory at Vargas Swamp was hard fought and contributed to the decisive defeat of the Spanish at the Battle of Boyacá. On 7 August at the Battle of Boyacá, Obando and his battalion played a decisive role in pinning down the Spanish vanguard at the bridge and eventually bayonet charged across it to conclude the Patriot victory.

=== Southern Campaign 1820-24 ===
After the victory at Boyacá most of central and eastern New Granada was liberated from Spanish control. Obando along with all those who participated in the campaign received the cross of Boyacá. Obando was then named military governor of the Province of Mariquita, where he based in the provincial capital of Honda. Obando would hold this position for only 2 months as he was then named military governor of the Province of Popayán in the south of New Granada, arriving there in January 1820.

Obando would be governor for merely a few days, with the only forces at his disposal being the 300 to 400 troops of the "Tiradores" battalion that were garrisoned in the city, he was attacked on 24 January 1820 by Colonel Sebastián de la Calzada's 2,500-strong royalist army that had launched a counteroffensive on the Gran Colombian forces in Popayán leading to the loss of the city. The loss of Popayán was harshly criticized by President Bolívar and Obando was ordered to Bogotá to face a military tribunal for his perceived incompetence as well as various other accusations such as having not carried out intelligence through the use of spies and having ignored warnings by locals. He faced his trial in May 1820, during the trial he was supported by the vice president Santander as well as other officers who testified in his defense, leading to the military tribunal absolving him of any blame, however Bolívar upon receiving news of the trial's outcome was displeased by its result. Obando returned to the south and was in charge of the defense of the Cauca Valley, Popayán would later be recovered after the Gran Colombian victory at the Battle of Pitayó on 16 July 1820.

Obando would remain in the south for next few years conducting operations against royalist regulars and guerrillas. He was placed as second in command of the army staff during the bloody Battle of Bomboná on 7 April 1822 which eventually saw the fall of Pasto under Gran Colombian control. On 12 June, Bolívar placed Obando as military governor of the Province of Pasto, Pasto had been fervent royalist bastion and even after the Battle of Bomboná support for the royalist cause had not dissipated leading to hostile environment against the Gran Colombian army in the city, which led Obando to instead place his headquarters in the town of Túquerres.

On 28 October, the royalists under the command of Captain Benito Boves once again took control of Pasto. Due to a lack of troops Obando requested reinforcements from Bolivar and General Antonio José de Sucre in Quito which had recently been liberated from Spanish control. Obando however was forced to battle against Boves and gathered 40 veteran troops and 300 militia to face Boves's 700 troops but was defeated when the two fought on the banks of Guáitara River. Bolívar blamed Obando for the defeat, and had to personally come with General Sucre to pacify the province leading to the massacre committed by the Gran Colombian army in Pasto in December 1822, known as the Black Christmas (Navidad Negra).

== Secretary of War and Navy ==
With the dissolution of Gran Colombia, and the creation of the Republic of New Granada in 1830, Obando continued in active service with the rank of general. He would leave active service in 1832 but continued an ascending career in public administration that led him to be part of the cabinet of President Francusco de Paula Santander as his Secretary of War and Navy serving as Secretary from 1833 to 1837 during all of Santander's presidency.

During his time as Secretary of War and Navy he faced the border war with Ecuador. He also had to deal with a conspiracy plot led army officers who were supporters of Bolívar, such as General Sardá who tried to create a military insurrection against the president Santander's government. This plot was discovered in due time and was able to be put down and with the main conspirators arrested and executed on charges of being traitors and insurrectionists.

He was also concerned with equipping the small New Granada navy with ships to protect the country's main ports.

== Later life and death ==
In 1837, with the election of José Ignacio de Márquez as President of New Granada, Obando was replaced as Secretary of War and Navy and was made commander-in-chief of the New Granadan army. Obando would only be commander for little more than year as he resigned his post after a series of disagreements with President Márquez.

After he resigned from the army he retired from public life.

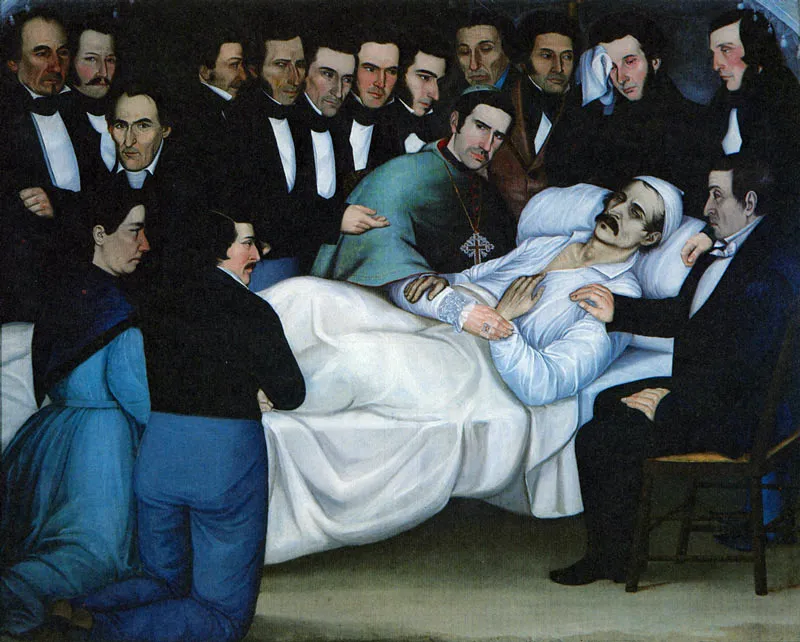
The death of General Francisco de Paula Santander by Luis García Hevia. Obando is first on the left standing.

He dedicated his time to his farm near Tocaima, in 1840 when General Santander fell gravely ill Obando was by his bedside along with Santander's other friends and political allies and was in the room at the time of his death. The two had been lifelong friends since the time they had spent together in the Llanos in 1818, in his final testament Santander stated that Obando owed him 500 pesos, he also gifted Obando a wooden chest that had been made in England that Santander had acquired when he lived in exile in Europe. During the funeral procession Obando was one of the few that carried his casket.

Obando died in Tocaima, Cundinamarca, on 30 December 1849. He was married to Eulalia Almeida, they had two daughters: Carlota and Josefa.

In gratitude for his services to the republic, the then president of the republic, José Hilario López issued a posthumous decree on 5 January 1850, honoring the deceased general and ordered that the first column of the National Army mourn for eight days.

20 years later during the presidency of Eustorgio Salgar, the Congress of the Republic decreed on 29 April 1870 that a portrait of the deceased general was to be placed in the room of patriotic monuments and that a mausoleum be created in the Central Cemetery of Bogotá to deposit the heart of General Obando.

=== Legacy ===
In 1969 in his hometown of Simacota, a public school was founded that bears his name. There is also a bust of him in the same town.
