= José María Cabal =

Republican military leader (1770–1816)

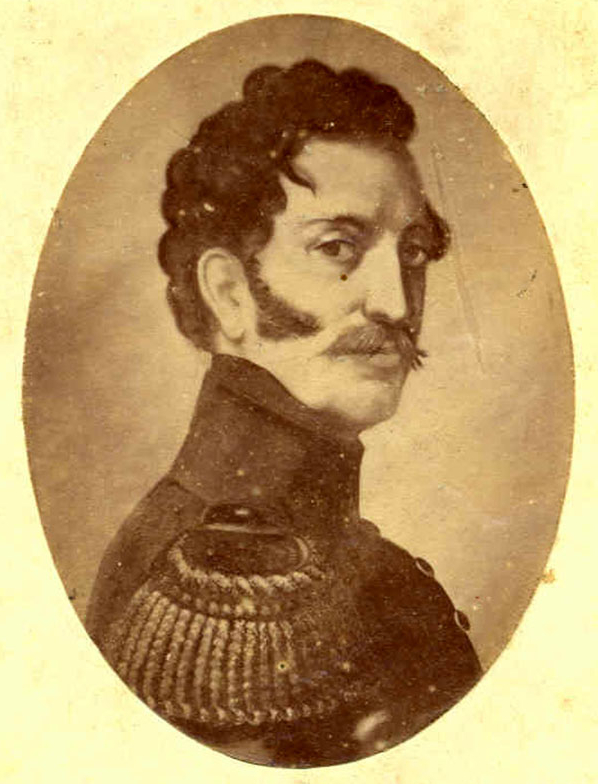
- Portrait of Cabal by José María Espinosa

President of the Confederated Cities of the Cauca Valley
- In office June 10, 1812 – 1816
- Preceded by: Joaquín Cayzedo
- Succeeded by: None

Personal details
- Born: May 25, 1769 Guadalajara de Buga, Viceroyalty of New Granada
- Died: August 19, 1816 (aged 47) Popayán, Viceroyalty of New Granada
- Spouse: Sophie Leclair

Military service
- Allegiance: New Granada
- Rank: Brigadier General
- Battles/wars: Colombian War of Independence; Battle of Popayán (1812); Battle of Catambuco (1812); Nariño's Southern Campaign; Battle of the Palo River

José María Cabal Barona (Guadalajara de Buga, 25 May 1769 – Popayán, 19 August 1816) was a Neogranadine military and political leader who fought in the Colombian War of Independence.

Born in 1769 into a noble, landowning family, Cabal received his primary education at the Colegio Seminario de Popayán. In 1792, he moved to Santafé de Bogotá to study law. There, he became involved in literary circles that embraced the ideals of the Enlightenment. In 1794, Cabal was arrested for possessing translated copies of the Declaration of the Rights of Man and of the Citizen and was exiled to Spain. He was acquitted and traveled through Spain and then France, where he pursued his studies in botany and mineralogy, which became lifelong passions.

In 1809, Cabal returned to New Granada after 14 years abroad. He dedicated himself to agricultural pursuits and scientific studies until the revolution swept across New Granada, ushering in the Colombian War of Independence. In 1810, he was chosen as a delegate to represent his city in the provisional junta established to govern the province of Popayán and was one of the founding signatories of the Confederation of the Cities of the Cauca Valley. This involvement propelled Cabal into the forefront of the various military campaigns in southern New Granada.

He successfully defended the city of Popayán from a royalist attack in April 1812. That same year, Cabal was appointed president of the junta following the capture of the previous president, Joaquín de Caycedo, by royalist forces in battle. He participated in an expedition to rescue Caycedo, but this effort was thwarted at the Battle of Catambuco, resulting in the near-destruction of the patriot army. Only Cabal and a few other officers and soldiers managed to escape. He then assumed command of the beleaguered patriot forces in the south as they valiantly defended Popayán against the royalists. In 1813, he traveled to Santafé to request military assistance from the central government.

The central government dispatched an army led by Lieutenant General Antonio Nariño, launching Nariño's Southern Campaign to liberate the south from royalist control. Cabal was appointed commander of Nariño's vanguard, playing a crucial role in the victories at the Battles of Alto Palacé and Calibío. Recognizing his contributions, Nariño appointed Cabal as second-in-command of the army. Cabal continued his participation in the campaign, distinguishing himself in the Battles of Juanambu and Tacines. However, the campaign stalled at the Battle of Ejidos de Pasto due to tactical errors and miscommunication, leading to the defeat of the patriot army and the capture of General Nariño by royalist forces. Cabal assumed command of the remaining forces and skillfully withdrew them back to Popayán. Fearing a royalist counteroffensive, he ordered the troops to withdraw to the Cauca Valley.

In 1815, Cabal was promoted to Brigadier General and confirmed as commander of the Army of the South. He reorganized and retrained the army, bolstering its ranks with new recruits and reinforcements. Under his leadership, the patriot army inflicted a stunning defeat on the royalist army at the Battle of the Palo River in July 1815, after luring the royalists into their fortified positions on the north bank of the river. This victory forced the royalists to relinquish all the gains they had made during their counteroffensive in late 1814 and retreat to Pasto. Cabal recaptured Popayán shortly afterward and was preparing an offensive to retake Pasto when news arrived of the invasion of the Spanish Expeditionary Army in the northern part of the country. This forced him to postpone his plans and divert valuable resources and equipment to other parts of the country.

By 1816, the Neogranadine Republic was on the verge of collapse as the Spanish had achieved significant victories. Cabal's Army of the South was now encircled by the enemy. Skeptical of the prospects for success against a larger and more formidable foe, he proposed dispersing the army into guerrilla units to wage a protracted war of attrition. However, his officers and troops, yearning for a decisive confrontation, viewed his suggestion as overly cautious. Discouraged by the lack of support and weary of years of relentless warfare, Cabal resigned his post. He returned to his hacienda to await the inevitable.

Following the defeat of the last patriot armies, Cabal was captured by Spanish troops, transported to Popayán, and executed by firing squad. He is considered one of the heroes of the Colombian War of Independence, renowned by his contemporaries for his valor, courage, and intelligence.

== Early years ==
José María Cabal Barona was born on May 25, 1769, in his family's Hacienda "La Concepción del Alisal" near the town of Guadalajara de Buga in the Viceroyalty of New Granada in the Spanish Empire. He was the son of José Cayetano Cabal and María Teresa Barona, Cabal was baptized in the chapel of the hacienda where he was born and would spend his formative years there.

In 1785, Cabal was sent to the city of Popayán to study at the Colegio Seminario de Popayán. During the next five years he studied philosophy and grammar, he was reportedly an excellent student and was heavily influenced by his teacher José Félix de Restrepo, among his classmates were other notable neogranadines, such as Camilo Torres, Francisco José de Caldas, and Francisco Antonio Zea who would later become important figures in the struggle for independence of Colombia.

In 1792 Cabal applied and was accepted to study at the Colegio Real y Seminario de San Bartolomé in the viceregal capital of Santa Fe de Bogotá. There he began his studies in law and would also form a close relation with his classmate Francisco Antonio Zea.

The relationship between the two was very close, with Cabal writing in a letter to his father "I must tell you that I owe a part of my intelligence due to Zea...". Through Zea, Cabal became involved in literary circles in the city whose members were prominent creoles who followed the ideas of the enlightenment.

=== Arrest and exile ===
In 1794, Cabal was arrested when members of his literary circle where found with translated copies of the Declaration of the Rights of Man and of the Citizen which had been translated by Antonio Nariño. Along with Nariño and Cabal other members were also arrested such as Zea and Frenchmen Luis De Rieux. The accused where then promptly sentenced to exile for their crimes.

Cabal and the other members that were arrested, left Santafé towards the end of 1795 and were transported to Cartagena de Indias where they were put on the Spanish Frigate Palas and departed the port on November 24. The prisoners then arrived to the port of Havana on December 7. From there Cabal was then transported to Spain, upon arriving to the port of Cádiz he awaited a decision on his case by the judicial authorities. He was then subsequently absolved of his crime, after this decision Cabal traveled to Madrid where he began his studies in natural history and botanical studies which soon became his lifelong passion. In 1801 he received news of the death of his father, the following year he traveled to Paris, France.

Cabal remained in the French capital for the next seven years, where he continued his studies that he had begun in Spain, as well as learning mineralogy with the aims of returning to Spain and New Granada as part of the Spanish Royal Mining company. During his time there he met with other important Latin American figures who resided in the French capital some of whom later became influential figures in the struggle for Spanish American independence those being a young Simón Bolívar as well as Francisco de Miranda. In 1804, he married a French woman, Sophie Leclair, with whom he had a son named Augusto Maria. In 1809 Cabal decided to return to New Granada as a result of the start of French invasion of Spain, but was unable to take his family with him as Spanish law saw their marriage as not valid as the French Republic had suspended Catholic marriages and was an atheist state, as a result under Spanish law Cabal was considered an adulterer.

After a long journey, Cabal returned to New Granada after being 14 years abroad, arriving in April 1809 at the port of Santa Marta, he then traveled to the capital of Santa Fe where he met with his former classmate Francisco Jose de Caldas, where he presented him with some new plants he had brought from Jamaica. He did not stay long in the capital, and returned to his family's hacienda in the Cauca Valley after having left there some 17 years ago.

As result of his travels, Cabal had collected a large number of new plants that he introduced to New Granada, and dedicated himself to agricultural work and scientific studies for the time being. This would change soon after as revolution began to sweep through New Granada.

== War of Independence ==
Despite dedicating his time to tending to his hacienda as well as his studies in botany and mineralogy, Cabal soon became entangled in the unstable political situation that was developing in New Granada. In early 1810 the Spanish authorities had attempted to name him as mayor of the city of Buga, a position he refused to accept. That same year various cities in New Granada rose up in revolt and deposed the Spanish authorities in charge of them and replaced them with governing juntas that demanded more autonomy within the Spanish Empire. In the capital Santa Fe on July 20, 1810 a popular revolt ended up deposing Viceroy Antonio Amar y Borbón and replaced him with a governing junta. In the city of Cali a provisional junta was also established that was meant to represent all of the cities within the province of Popayán. Various delegates were sent to Cali to represent their respective cities, Cabal was chosen as a delegate representing the city of Caloto, where his family owned a large amount of land. This provisional junta would eventually form the Confederated Cities of the Cauca Valley, Cabal along with other delegates signed the act of its creation in 1811.

The confederation attempted to have Popayán join as well, however its Spanish governor Miguel Tacón y Rosique considered the junta illegal and after various months of threats, deployed troops to put down the junta. This action led the confederation to ask the Supreme Junta Santafe for military assistance, who subsequently deployed 150 troops under the command of Colonel Antonio Baraya to assist them. These troops joined forces with those from the confederation and defeated the royalist troops near Popayán at the Battle of Bajo Palacé on March 28, 1811, amongst the patriot casualties of the battle were Cabal's cousin Miguel Cabal whose death was a heavy blow for him. This victory forced Tacón and the royalists to retreat south and abandon Popayán to the victorious Patriot forces who entered the city on April 1. The junta then moved from Cali to Popayán where they delegated on choosing the president and vice president of the junta. On June 26, 1811 Joaquin Caycedo y Cuero was elected president and Jose Maria Cabal as vice president.

The junta soon began a military campaign to liberate the southern cities of Pasto and Quito, and deployed forces to secure the Pacific coast of the province fearing that a royalist threat from the south could jeopardize their existence. President Caycedo would lead this southern campaign himself, and departed with the Patriot troops on July 22, leaving Cabal in charge in his absence as well as assuming military control of Popayán. Alongside Cabal was an American adventurer Alexander Macaulay who was commissioned into the patriot army and who would assist him.

Caycedo and his forces eventually took the city of Pasto after lengthy negotiations, and marched south hoping to reach the Quito province in order assist the patriots of that province. Patriot forces were also deployed to the Pacific Coast under the command of Captain Jose Ignacio Rodriguez who defeated a small Spanish flotilla at the Battle of Iscuande in January 1812.

=== Defense of Popayán ===
In April 1812, a significant number of royalist guerrillas revolted in response to patriot offensives. Aware that Popayán's defenses were weakened due to Colonel Baraya's return with his troops to Santafé, they marched on the city. These royalist irregulars, commanded by Antonio Tenorio and José Joaquín de la Paz, amassed an estimated 1,500 fighters. With most patriot troops deployed to support President Caycedo's southern offensive, only 300 defenders remained in the city. This force comprised regular soldiers, militia, and even students, under the command of Colonel Cabal and other officers.

Despite the fact that Cabal was in command of the garrison he was inexperienced in troop command, and ended up allowing Alexander Macaulay, a former medical officer in the U.S. Army, to assume command. Macaulay, who had been traveling from Santafé to Quito, was unaware of the unfolding events in the country and had offered his services to the patriot government On April 26, Tenorio's troops arrived on the western outskirts of the city and entered into street-to-street combat with the defenders of the city. During the battle Cabal placed a cannon on one of the main streets of the city and fired it himself clearing the Santo Domingo street of enemy troops. The patriots mounted an effective defensive by placing barricades with artillery behind them as well shooting from windows that kept the enemy at bay. Later on Cabal and Macaulay launched a counterattack that drove the royalists out of the city in what would be known as the Battle of La Ladera and forced them to retreat south to Pasto. On April 29, Cabal and Macaulay gathered around 600 troops to chase after the royalists.

The city had been defended successfully, however president Caycedo and his army in Pasto had been unaware of the events in Popayán and on May 20, were caught by surprise when the royalists assaulted Pasto. Outnumbered Caycedo and his troops were forced to surrender and were held captive in the city. While Cabal and Macaulay had left Popayán with enough time to have been able to catch the royalists before they attacked Caycedo, they became delayed during their march when a lieutenant captured a royalist priest by the name of Morcillo. The government in Popayán had previously placed an order for his arrest because of his ardent support for the royalists. The secretary of government Francisco Antonio Ulloa in Popayán, then informed Cabal that the government had decided to order Morcillo's execution. Colonel Cabal disagreed with this sentence and informed the government of this, Ulloa responded to this notification angrily stating "that the government had seen this action as disgraceful, as it was an officer's duty to obey a direct order." Cabal then begrudgingly obeyed and ordered the execution of the priest. This event resulted in a ten-day delay for the expeditionary force. Although Macaulay ordered his troops to march at double pace, they only reached Meneses, an area near Pasto, on May 26. It was at Meneses that Cabal and his officers learned of the patriot defeat, the capture of President Caycedo, and the subsequent capture of his army. Upon receiving this news, Cabal and Macaulay convened a meeting with all the officers of the expeditionary force. They agreed to withdraw to Popayán, as they lacked the sufficient manpower to capture the city and rescue President Caycedo.

After a difficult march the patriot troops finally reached Popayán on June 10, 1812. To their fortune, during the following days they received reinforcements from the capital under the command of Colonel Antonio Villavicencio who brought with him 200 troops along with 100 rifles and other supplies.

=== President of the Junta ===
With the capture of Caycedo, the government appointed Colonel Cabal as President of the junta. Cabal then undertook the task of organizing a new expedition to capture Pasto, rescue Caycedo, and, if possible, continue south to Quito to assist the patriots there who were under the threat of Spanish forces led by Governor Toribio Montes, and colonels Juan de Sámano, and Melchor Aymerich.

This new expedition, which departed the city at the beginning of July, was commanded by Macaulay, who had been given the rank of Colonel, with Cabal acting as his second-in-command. As they advanced south, they encountered a series of royalist fortifications situated near the Juanambú River. After two days and one night of combat, the patriots forced their way across the river, forcing the royalists to retreat to Buesaco. Towards the end of July, the patriots were on the northern outskirts of Pasto, assisted by an army of patriots from the Quito province under the command of Joaquín Sánchez de Arellana, who positioned his forces to the south of the city.

With Pasto surrounded, the royalist officials, fearing the destruction of the city, entered into lengthy negotiations. On July 26, with the intervention of Caycedo, the royalists signed a negotiated surrender of the city, with various stipulations. The royalists fulfilled their part of the agreement by releasing Caycedo and the patriot prisoners.

However, instead of fulfilling his part of the agreement and withdrawing his forces from the city as stipulated, Macaulay issued an ultimatum on August 11, this time far harsher than the previous one. The city council immediately rejected this ultimatum, and hostilities resumed.

On the morning of August 13, Colonel Macaulay and his troops attempted to conduct a surprise maneuver when they were attacked by royalist troops near Catambuco. The Battle of Catambuco resulted in a total defeat for the patriots, with 600 men lost: 200 killed or wounded, and 400 captured, including almost all of their officers. The only troops who were able to escape the disaster were Colonel Cabal and a column of 117 soldiers, along with Captain Pedro Murgeitio, Majors José María Quijano, Mariano Matute, and Rafael Cuervo.

Among the prisoners taken at the Battle of Catambuco were Colonel Macaulay and Caycedo. Five months later, on January 26, 1813, they were executed in the main plaza of Pasto by order of Governor Toribio Montes in Quito, along with 10 other officers. The other prisoners were either forced to march to Quito or killed.

The news of the disaster at Catambuco reached Popayán shortly thereafter. Fearing a renewed royalist offensive to capture the city, the government decided to retreat north to Quilichao. As a result, Cabal was given full command of the Army of the South. In September, the royalists once again attacked Popayán and captured it, as it had been abandoned. Cabal, along with Colonel Ignacio Rodríguez, organized a force and was able to retake the city on October 9. After this victory, Popayán remained under patriot control until mid-1813 when the Spanish launched another, far stronger offensive.

In early 1813 news reached Popayán of the defeat of the patriots of Quito at the Battle of Ibarra fought between November 27 to December 1 of 1812. With this defeat, everything south of Popayán was now once again under Spanish control, governed by Toribio Montes, Governor and President of the Real Audiencia of Quito. Montes, who had received support from Spanish troops sent from the Viceroyalty of Peru and Spain, with Quito province and the city of Pasto firmly under his control, turned his attention to New Granada, which had been under patriot control since 1810. He gathered 2,000 troops and placed them under the command of Colonel Juan de Sámano to prepare for an offensive against New Granada.

Worried about this possible offensive, the government in Popayán decided to send Colonel Cabal to the capital, Santafé, to request military assistance. Cabal departed for the capital in early 1813, arriving there in April. The situation in central New Granada since 1812 had been one of civil war as the patriots began to fight among themselves over the system of governance that the republic should follow: federalism or centralism. The centralists were led by Antonio Nariño in Santafé who had created the Free and Independent State of Cundinamarca while the federalists led by Camilo Torres in Tunja had established a federal congress where the delegates of 5 provinces joined to form the United Provinces of New Granada. The two fought a brief civil war that had been going in favor of the federalists, however they were defeated when they attempted to capture Santafé at the Battle of San Victorino on January 9, 1813. The two sides then signed an armistice and agreed to join forces, as Cabal had informed them of the royalist threat in the south, as well as another royalist threat of invasion in the north from royalist-controlled Venezuela.

=== Nariño's southern campaign ===
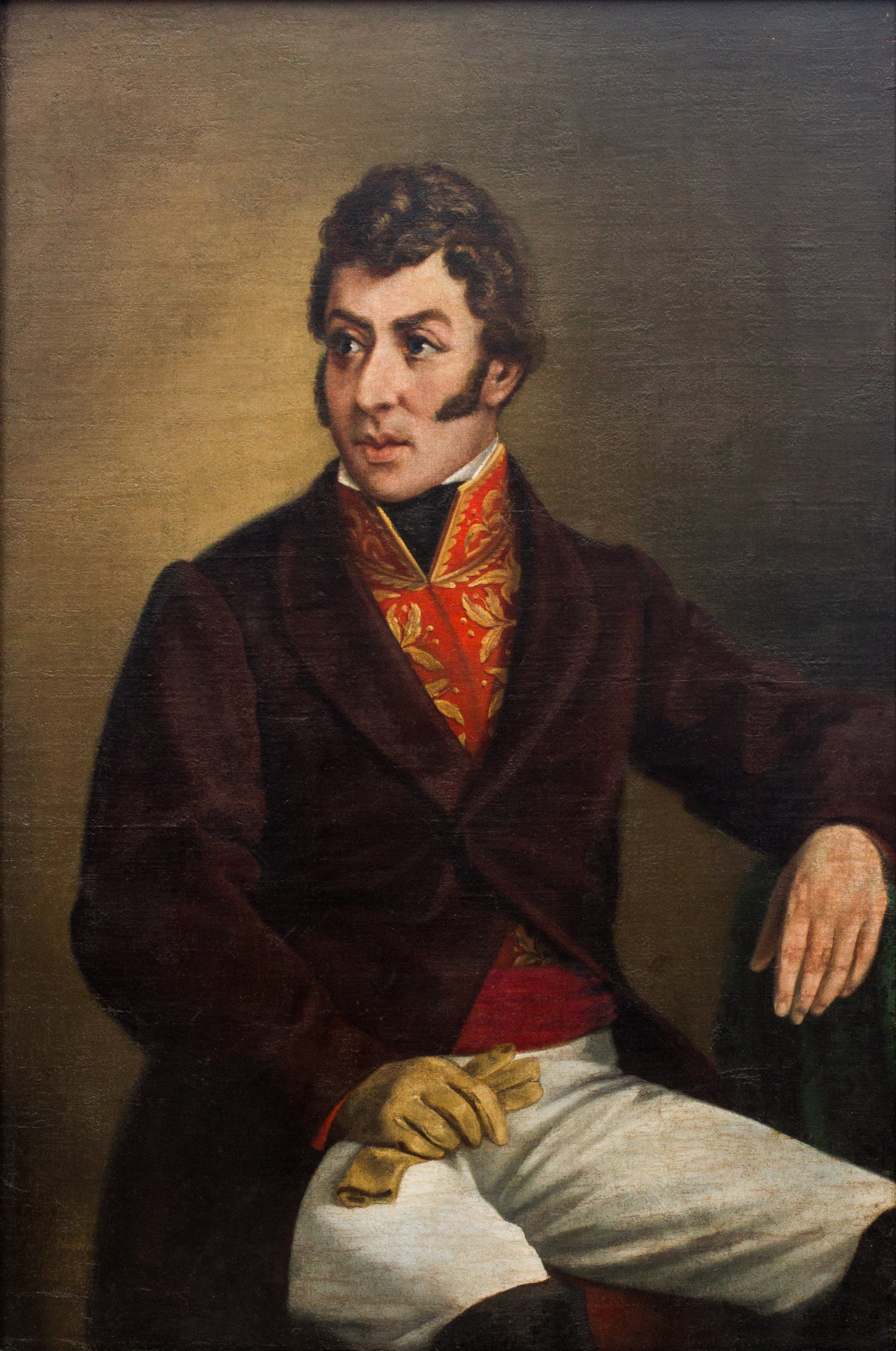
Lt. General Antonio Nariño by José María Espinosa

President Nariño offered to command the army to liberate the south, an offer that both the electoral college of Cundinamarca and the federal congress of the United Provinces agreed upon, and as a result on June 28, 1813, Nariño was given the rank of Lieutenant general and named commander-in-chief of the Army of the Union that would liberate the south from the Spanish royalists. This army would be made up of units from Cundinamarca's provincial army and the federal congress's forces. Nariño then chose the officers that would command the army, Brigadier Jose de Leyva was chosen as second-in-command, Colonel Cabal as commander of the army's vanguard, and Nariño's son Lt. Colonel Antonio Nariño Ortega was placed in command of the army's cavalry. Cabal was one of the first officers to depart the capital, doing so on July 22 with around 200 men in the direction of Ibague as Nariño had given him orders to secure the vital Quindio Road, the main route to enter central New Granada from the south.

While this was happening, in June, Colonel Samano launched his offensive on southern New Granada. He successfully captured Popayán on July 1 as the city's small garrison, under Colonel Rodriguez, had withdrawn north to the Cauca Valley Samano continued his offensive into the valley in pursuit of Rodriguez's forces, on July 18, he captured Cali and made his way up to the town of Cartago where a small force 150 patriot troops under the command of French cavalry officer Lt. Colonel Manuel de Serviez attempted to stop him. On August 5, Samano's forces defeated Serviez at the Battle of Las Cañas, forcing the patriots to retreat to Ibague via the Quindio Road, meanwhile Samano halted his offensive and withdrew to Popayán.

When Cabal arrived in Ibagué, he received the battered survivors who had been under Serviez's command and incorporated them into the army's vanguard. While there, he recruited troops, deployed spies over the Central Andes Mountain Range to inform the army of Samano's movements, and also ordered Serviez to create a new cavalry unit to be incorporated into the army. On September 23, General Nariño departed the capital. Nariño and the bulk of the army marched to the town of La Plata, arriving there on October 25. This town was selected as the staging area for the army before the start of the offensive on Popayán. After completing his orders in Ibagué, Cabal marched to La Plata with his vanguard and joined Nariño's forces. The army remained in the town for the next two months, training and preparing themselves for the arduous crossing across the Andes via the Guanacas road, which would allow them to approach Popayán from the east. During this time, a group of foreign officers—Campomanes, Serviez, and Shambourg—who had been implementing and teaching the French manual of arms to the patriot army, were accused of conspiring against Nariño. Cabal interceded on their behalf and recommended that Nariño send them back to Santafé to face a military tribunal, where they were more likely to receive a fair trial.

==== Battle of Alto Palacé ====
Soon after the incident, the army was ready to depart. Nariño’s plan involved crossing the Andes through the Guanacas Pass and approaching Popayán from the east, while Colonel Rodriguez would march from Ibagué, and Colonel Gutiérrez’s troops would advance south from Antioquia, invading the Cauca Valley and approaching Popayán from the north. On December 20, 1813, Nariño, at the head of his 2,000-strong army, began crossing the Andes, with Rodriguez and Gutiérrez also starting their marches. Sámano soon received information about his enemy’s movements and decided to split his army in two, sending 1,000 men north to the town of Quilichao under the command of Lt. Colonel Ignacio Asín to defend Popayán from the north, while he himself blocked Nariño from the east at the bridge over the Palacé River with 600 troops. At the bridge, Sámano positioned his forces in three areas: one on the heights overlooking the bridge in battle formation with infantry, cavalry, and two artillery pieces; another group on the bridge itself; and a third group in the forest surrounding the main road.

On December 30, Nariño spotted the royalists positioned on the heights above the bridge and ordered Colonel Cabal to take the vanguard of the army (some 300 troops) and force their way across the bridge. This would mark the beginning of the Battle of Alto Palacé. Cabal and his troops descended from the mountain towards the bridge where they were fired upon by the royalists, despite the heavy fire from the hidden royalist units, Cabal persisted and continued on with the attack and his troops were able to force their way across the bridge over Palacé River. The patriot troops were also able to prevent the royalists from blowing up the bridge after they had cleared of it of enemy troops, sustaining few casualties in the process. The defeat at Alto Palacé forced Sámano to retreat to the town of El Tambo, just west of Popayán. The victory allowed the Patriots to capture the city; however, Nariño was concerned about the possibility of Asín’s forces joining Sámano’s to conduct a counterattack. After entering the city and finding it clear of troops, Nariño promptly left and set up camp at the Bajo Palacé field, located north of the city along the main road leading from the Cauca Valley. He remained there for the next few days, attempting to block Asín, who was marching south from Quilichao while being pursued by Rodríguez’s troops, from linking up with Sámano’s forces.

In the meantime, Nariño ordered Cabal to conduct reconnaissance on Sámano’s forces, which had marched from El Tambo and made camp at the Calibío Hacienda. Despite the Patriots’ efforts to prevent the two enemy forces from reuniting, on the night of January 8, 1814, Lt. Colonel Asín managed to reach the Calibío Hacienda using a series of alternative roads to avoid detection. Cabal, who was near the area conducting reconnaissance, informed Nariño of this development and requested permission to attack, confident of success. However, Nariño denied the request and ordered Cabal to withdraw to the main Patriot camp, as he wished to present battle against Sámano with his full strength, particularly since Colonel Rodríguez’s troops marching south had not yet arrived.

==== Battle of Calibío ====
On January 13, Rodríguez and his troops finally arrived, and Nariño was now ready to engage Sámano at the Calibío Hacienda, located about 8 km from his camp at Bajo Palacé. The Patriot army had approximately 2,000 troops with ample artillery, while the Royalist army had a similar number of troops and artillery. At 6 a.m. on January 15, Nariño gave the order to march toward the hacienda, a journey that took approximately four hours to complete.

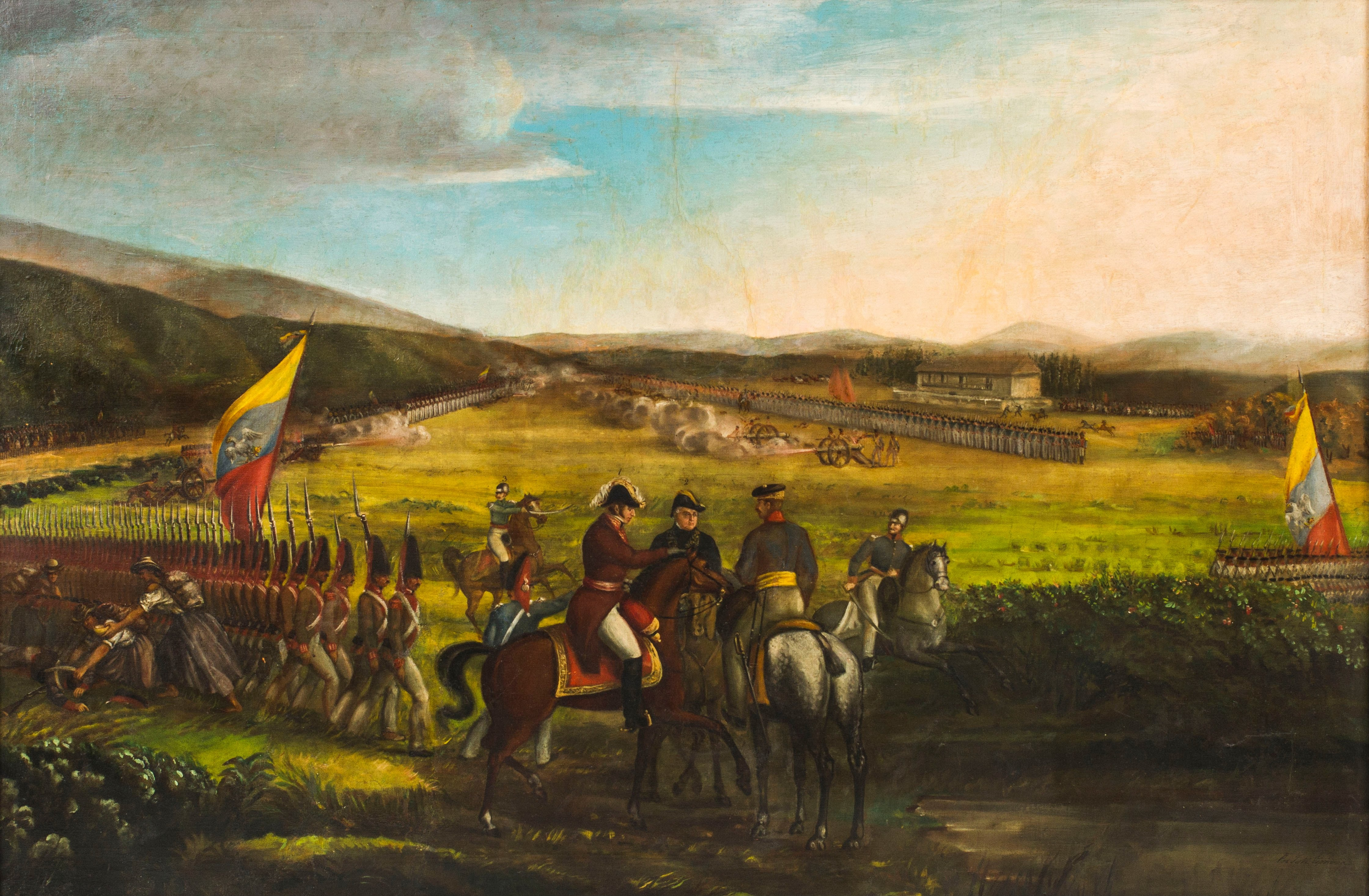
The Battle of Calibio by José María Espinosa. Cabal is in the center, to the right.

After the Patriots arrived at the hacienda, they quickly formed into battle formation, organizing into three columns. The left column consisted of the Socorro Battalion under the command of Sergeant Major Pedro Monsalve, along with the troops of Colonel Rodríguez. The center column, which held the bulk of the army and the artillery, was under the command of Nariño and Brigadier Leyva. Colonel Cabal commanded the right column, which was positioned in a small depression where it could not be seen by the enemy, where it awaited for the right moment to launch an attack.

The battle began with both sides exchanging heavy volleys and artillery fire along the center. Half an hour into the battle, Cabal received orders from Nariño to advance on the enemy’s left. Cabal’s column moved forward and appeared before the enemy at a distance of less than rifle shot from the Royalist left flank. At that moment, Cabal ordered his column to charge with bayonets. Cabal’s attack caught Sámano by surprise, as he did not anticipate an assault on his left flank. In response, Sámano frantically deployed a detachment of 50 troops and an artillery piece to repel the attack. This assault, combined with an attack by the Cundinamarca Grenadiers Battalion from the center column, succeeded in breaking the Royalist lines and capturing their artillery. The breach created by this breakthrough allowed the Patriot cavalry to exploit the gap and attack the Royalist center.

The bloody, three-hour-long battle ended in a decisive defeat for the Royalists, who suffered 400 dead and wounded, the loss of nearly all their weapons, and the capture of 300 men. Following this defeat, the Royalists embarked on a disastrous retreat to Pasto. The Battle of Calibío was the most important engagement of the Southern Campaign. Cabal’s actions during the battle contributed significantly to the victory, as his attack surprised the Royalists and caused a decisive imbalance on their left flank from which they could not recover.

After the victory, the patriot army marched triumphantly into Popayán. Nariño then made Cabal Chief of Staff of the army, as Brigadier Leyva was tasked with governing Popayán.

=== 1815 Campaign ===
After the withdrawal of the Army of the South to the Cauca Valley, Cabal decided to garrison his troops in the town of Palmira, it would be here where he began his plan to reorganize and re-train the army. New training was implemented for the troops, with a focus on physical fitness, every day the troops would begin their day with marching from five in the morning for two hours at double pace. In addition to training a new organizational doctrine was also implemented as Cabal had requested the War Secretariat of New Granada for authorization to adopt the French doctrine regarding divisional commands, which had been translated from French to Spanish. These efforts on the part of Cabal were welcomed by the government of the United Provinces who decided to promote him from the rank of Colonel to the rank of brigadier general of the army of the union and confirm him as commander-in-chief of the Army of the South. After many months of preparation, Cabal managed to reorganize the army of the south, the army now numbered around 1,200 infantrymen composed of five line battalions, these being the Battalions Cundinamarca, Socorro, Antioquia, Popayán and Cauca. In addition to these infantry battalions, Cabal had at his disposal about 150 light cavalry divided into two squadrons along with a squadron of artillery men and their cannons. The government also dispatched some officers to the southern army to assist Cabal in his task, such as Colonel Carlos de Montúfar a native of Quito and two French officers Colonel Manuel Roergas de Serviez and cavalry captain Honorato Dufour. Cabal quickly incorporated these officers into his staff and appointed Montúfar as chief of headquarters and Serviez as his chief of staff. These efforts were necessary actions in order to ensure the defense of the Valle del Cauca from an expected royalist counter-offensive. This counteroffensive would be right around the corner as the governor of Quito Toribio Montes was preparing an army to invade the valley that would be led by Colonel Aparicio Vidauzárraga.

Colonel Vidauzárraga, who had taken control of Popayán after the retreat of the patriot army, after months of preparations and the arrival of reinforcements from Quito and Peru began his counteroffensive to invade the Valley at the end of June 1815 with about 2000 troops along with artillery. Cabal in anticipation of this, ordered the army's vanguard to maintain an advanced position on the banks of the Ovejas River, the vanguard was made up of elements of the Socorro and Antioquia battalions numbering around 300 troops. Along with the advanced positions at Ovejas, Cabal had devised a defensive plan, in case superior forces attacked the advance positions at Ovejas and tried to conduct their offensive into the Valley. The plan consisted of carrying out a dilatory defense by means of successive defense lines, located on the mound of El Pital, in the Alto de Mondomo and at the heights of Tremblera and Cascabel, this would attract the enemy, and cause as much damage as possible, before leading them to the fortified positions at the El Palo field, where Cabal planned to defeat them. Cabal had ordered the fortification of the Palo field towards the end of May, the field was located on the north bank of the Palo River just north of the town Caloto.

This plan went into effect when the patriot vanguard made contact with the royalist vanguard towards the end of June. The patriot vanguard fought with the enemy for two hours until the Socorro battalion commander Lieutenant Colonel Pedro Monsalve ordered his forces to withdraw to Quilichao. Encouraged by this small victory, the royalists continued their advance northwards and around noon on July 4, 1815, Colonel Vidauzárraga's forces arrived on the opposite side of the Palo River. Although some of his commanders wanted to attack immediately, the Spanish commander decided to take his time to look for some way to cross the river and attack without having to deal with the patriot fortifications. While the Spanish conducted their reconnaissance of the field, that night of July 4, Cabal gathered all his officers to discuss the last details prior to the beginning of the confrontation.

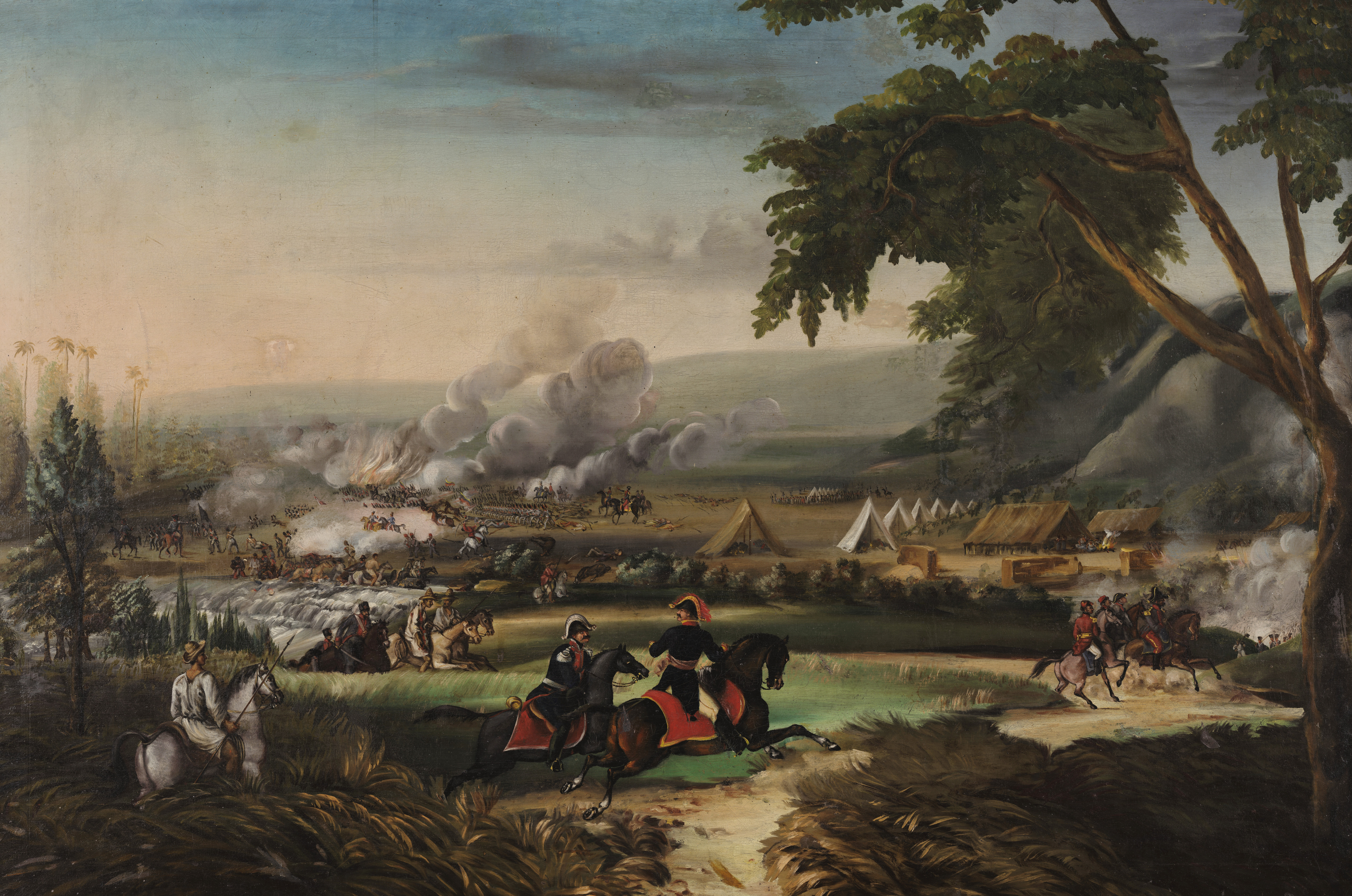
Battle of the Palo River by José María Espinosa.

The Battle of the Palo River began at 5 am on July 5, 1815, when a column of royalist troops crossed the Palo river through a ford below the "Pasó Real" to avoid patriot defenses and attack their right flank. The two patriot units positioned in advance along the river, the Popayán and Cauca battalions, detected this movement and alerted the rest of the troops. The army swiftly assembled and prepared for battle. While the advanced units withdrew in an organized manner, Cabal assumed command of the Cundinamarca battalion on the left. He positioned Montúfar in the center with the Socorro battalion, accompanied by the three artillery pieces. On the right flank, Serviez commanded the Antioquia battalion.

With the royalists now on the other side of the river, they immediately engaged the patriots with a cavalry attack on the patriot left flank. Cabal immediately ordered the patriot cavalry to attack from the right, which managed to contain the assault of the royalists and caused panic among their troops. The battle soon concluded with a simultaneous bayonet charge by the three front line battalions Cundinamarca, Socorro and Antioquia supported by artillery which forced the royalist to retreat across the swollen river, where many drowned in the process.

At 8:30 in the morning, the Spanish army was retreating in defeat, pursued closely by the patriots. From the summit of Cascabel Hill, he dispatched a letter to his cousin, Francisco Cabal, the patriot governor of the province, announcing the victory. In the letter, he stated the following:

"The arms of the nation have triumphed. Today at five in the morning the enemy presented us with a lot of intrepidity, having passed the river through the steps below. Our officers and soldiers have behaved like Republicans"

The victory decisively crushed the royalist offensive. Colonel Serviez's relentless pursuit of the fleeing royalists enabled him to recapture Popayán on July 8. This triumph ensured that southern New Granada would remain under patriot control for at least a year.

With Popayán firmly in patriot hands, Cabal began planning an offensive to capture Pasto. However, an order soon arrived from the government halting all planning for this offensive. The republic was now under threat as a Spanish expeditionary army, commanded by General Pablo Morillo, had landed on the shores of New Granada in August 1815. This Spanish army, comprising approximately 10,000 expeditionary troops and 6,000 royalist Venezuelan troops, launched an invasion of New Granada. By the end of August, Morillo laid siege to the port of Cartagena de Indias, and in October, Colonel Sebastian de la Calzada, with 2,100 troops, invaded eastern New Granada from the Llanos of Venezuela.

The government in Santafé immediately ordered Cabal to transfer troops and supplies to assist in the defense of the country's northern provinces. Officers like Colonel Serviez were also ordered to assist, significantly depleting the southern army of its capable officers, troops, and equipment.

== Death ==
By early 1816, the situation of the Republic was precarious. General Morillo, after a three-month siege, had captured the city of Cartagena in December of the previous year. Following this victory, he deployed several columns to conquer the different provinces of the interior of New Granada. Colonel Julian Bayer was tasked with taking the province of Chocó, and Colonel Francisco Warleta was assigned to capture the province of Antioquia.

The situation continued to deteriorate. In February, Colonel Calzada defeated the patriot army of the north at the Battle of Cachirí, leaving the road to the republican capital open. The remnants of the northern army initiated a strategic retreat to the eastern plains of New Granada, led by the recently promoted General Serviez in April. In May, Santafé fell to the Spanish.

That same month, Colonel Julián Bayer successfully captured the province of Chocó, and Colonel Francisco Warleta defeated the patriot troops in the Antioquia province. These two forces were now advancing southward, joined by Colonel Carlos Tolrá, who was leading a division from the recently captured Santafé.

To the south of Popayán in Quito, Governor Montes, in conjunction with Morillo, ordered Brigadier Juan de Sámano, at the helm of 2,000 troops, to launch an offensive against Popayán. This army departed from Pasto at the end of May. By the beginning of June, Sámano had successfully positioned his troops in a fortified position on the ridge of the Cuchilla del Tambo, approximately six leagues from Popayán.

Cabal found the situation alarming. His army lacked both the troops and ammunition to engage Sámano in a conventional battle. He proposed to his officers that the only viable strategy for resisting the Spanish offensive would be to divide the troops into guerrilla units and retreat to the Cauca Valley, where they could conduct guerrilla warfare against the enemy.

The officers and soldiers of the southern army were dissatisfied with Cabal's leadership, believing his strategy to be insufficiently aggressive to defeat the enemy. José Hilario López, in his memoirs, acknowledged Cabal's respect and bravery as a commander but deemed his inaction "criminal." López suggested that Cabal had seemingly resigned himself to relinquishing command. Cabal failed to persuade his officers to adopt his strategy. Exhausted and overwhelmed by years of warfare, he decided to resign from his command. Lieutenant Colonel Andrés Rosas convened a board of officers to review General Cabal's decision. The board relieved him of his command and subsequently appointed Lieutenant Colonel Liborio Mejía, commander of the Antioquia battalion, as his successor.

Shortly after, the army of the south would be totally defeated at the Battle of Cuchilla del Tambo on June 29, 1816, when they went out and attacked Sámano's fortified positions. The few who were able to escape the disaster joined up with another patriot force in La Plata, but were defeated at the Battle of La Plata on July 10, 1816.

=== Arrest and Execution ===
After the painful episode of his resignation from command, Cabal retreated to his hacienda in the Cauca Valley, seeking solace before the inevitable. Following the arrival of Colonel Warleta and his Spanish troops from Antioquia, a search was ordered for Cabal. During this time, many of Cabal’s family members were arrested in an attempt to uncover his location. Warleta’s troops eventually captured the head worker of Cabal’s hacienda and, after repeatedly torturing him, were able to determine Cabal’s whereabouts.

Cabal was arrested shortly thereafter and taken to Popayán, where he was subjected to a summary trial by Brigadier Sámano and found guilty of treason. His property was confiscated, and he was sentenced to death by firing squad. On the afternoon of August 19, 1816, José María Cabal was executed in the main square of Popayán, along with Colonels Mariano Matute and José María Quijano. All three were shot simultaneously while facing backward. After the execution, Cabal’s body was hanged from the gallows and left on display for several hours as a warning to the public.

His body was buried in the Church of San Francisco in the city of Popayán. His remains remained there until 1892 when they were transferred in a solemn ceremony to his home town of Buga.

== Legacy ==
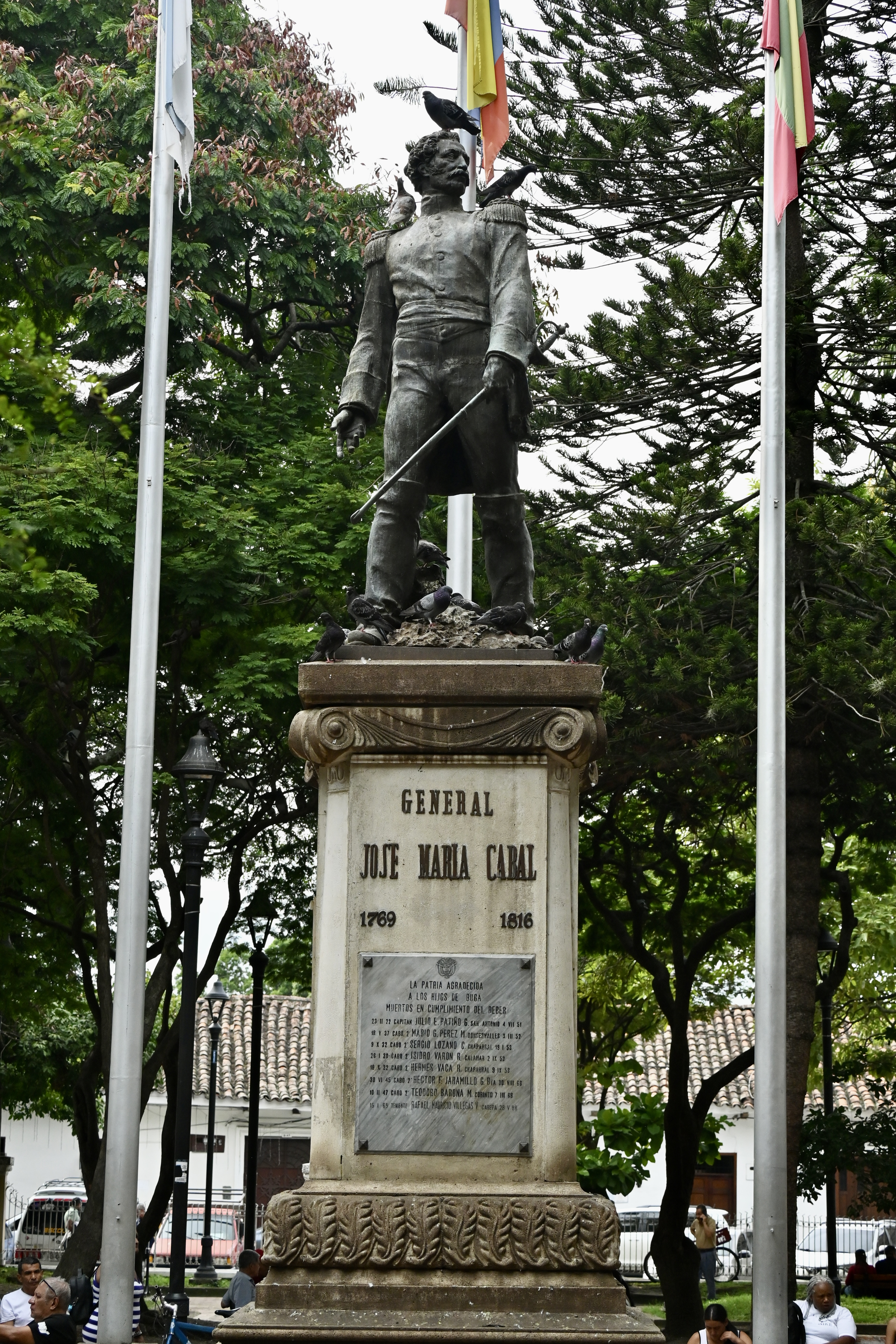
A bronze statue of José María Cabal located in the town of Buga made by the Italian sculptor Fernando Rubinni in 1926.

José María Cabal is regarded as one of the heroes of Colombia’s independence. During his lifetime, he was recognized by his contemporaries as a courageous and brilliant man. In his defense before the Senate on May 24, 1824, Antonio Nariño stated that the memory of Cabal “must always be engraved in the hearts of all lovers of freedom, of all the good citizens of Colombia, and his name written among the first heroes of our national transformation.” Nariño further declared that Cabal “was one of the most fearless and brave officers” in his army.

The Venezuelan humanist and politician Andrés Bello mentioned Cabal in his poem Fragments of a poem entitled "America'

Lays Cabal, of Popayán cried, cried of the sciences;

The National Army of Colombia honors Cabal by naming the 3rd Mechanized Cavalry Group "General José María Cabal" after him. This unit is stationed on the border with Ecuador, with its base in the city of Ipiales.

In his hometown of Buga, the city's main park is named Parque José María Cabal in his honor since 1908. This park features a bronze statue of General Cabal, created by the Italian sculptor Fernando Rubinni. Funded by local donations, the statue was installed on its pedestal in 1926. In the city of Cali, a public school also bears his name.
