= Battle of the Palo River =

1815 Colombian War of Independence battle

- Part of the Colombian War of Independence
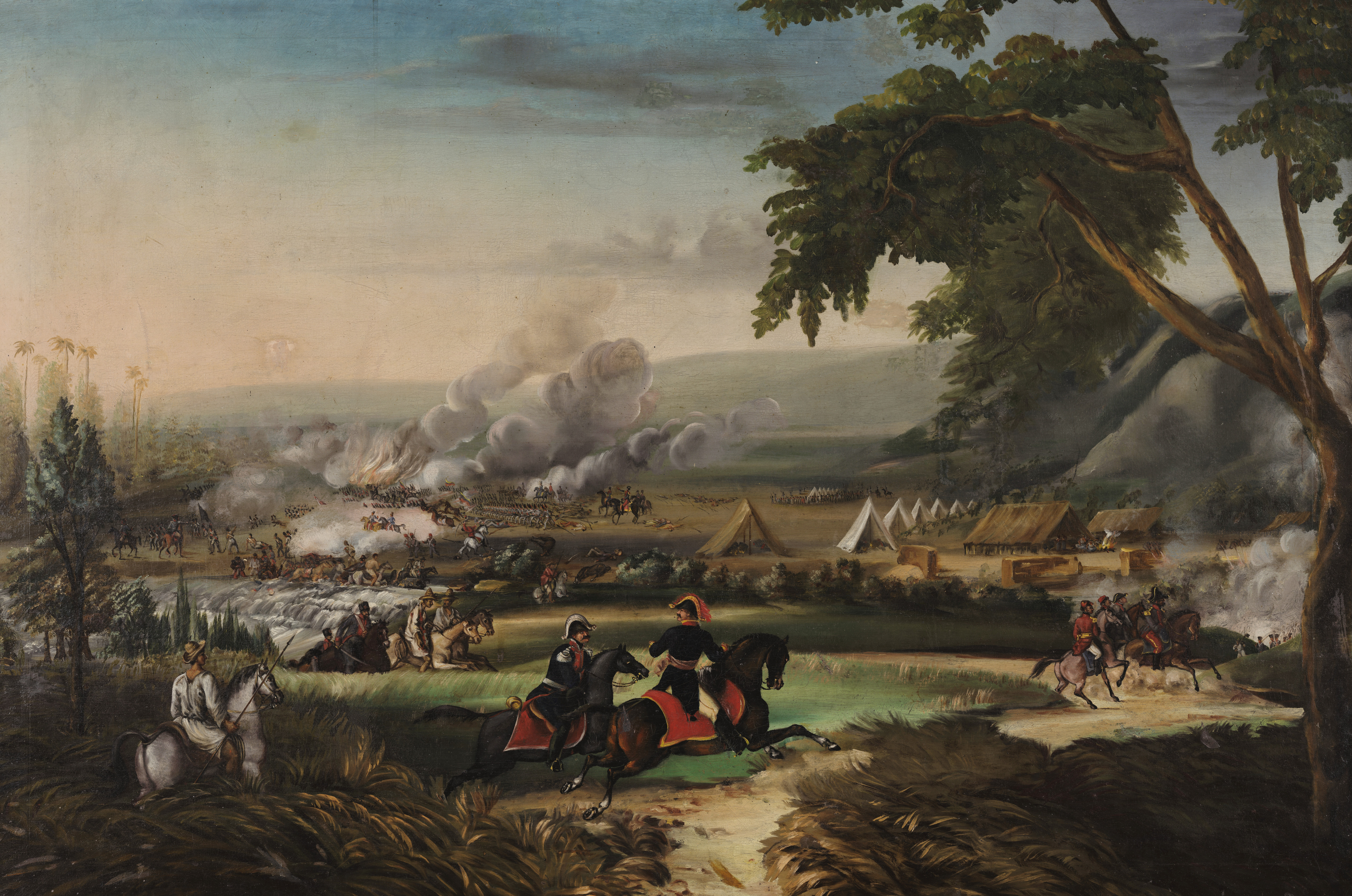
- Battle of the Palo River by José María Espinosa
Date	June 5, 1815
Location	near Caloto, Cauca
Result	Republican victory

Belligerents
New Granada	Kingdom of Spain

Commanders and leaders
José María Cabal; Carlos de Montúfar; Manuel Roergas Serviez; Liborio Mejía; José María Córdova	Aparicio Vidaurrázaga; Francisco Soriano †; Joaquín de Paz †

Strength
1,200	2,100

Casualties and losses
49 dead 121 wounded	315 dead 500 captured

The Battle of the Palo River (Spanish: Batalla del río Palo) was a battle of the Colombian War of Independence, fought on July 5, 1815, in which the army of the southern United Provinces of New Granada defeated the Spanish Royalist army of Quito.

After the failure of Antonio Nariño's southern campaign in 1814, the remnants of the independence forces withdrew to Popayán under the command of colonel José María Cabal. The victorious royalists, now under Lieutenant Colonel Aparicio Vidaurrázaga, went on a counter offensive in late December 1814, capturing the city of Popayán on December 29, 1814. They looked to invade the Cauca Valley, where the independence forces had retreated, and if successful, reconquer the rest of New Granada. Cabal, now brigadier general, placed the majority of his forces in a foritifed position on the northern bank of the Palo River, planning to lead the royalist forces there. The battle occurred after a series of retreating skirmishes broke out between the independence forces and the royalist army in June 1815. The royalists appeared on the south bank of the Palo river on July 4, and began their assault in the early morning hours of July 5.

The battle was a decisive victory for the independence forces and one of the most important battles of the Colombian War of Independence. The victory at Palo River allowed the republicans to recapture Popayán and push the royalists back to Pasto. For the next year, the Cauca province of New Granada was free of Spanish Royalist presence. This lasted until June 1816, when the royalists conducted an offensive in tandem with Pablo Morillo's expeditionary army from Spain coming from the north.

== Prelude ==
With the failure of Nariño's southern campaign in 1814 after the patriot defeat at the Battle of Ejidos de Pasto, the remnants of the patriot army who were at the gates of Pasto were forced to retreat back to Popayán, and shortly after fell back towards the Cauca Valley. With the patriots in retreat, and the return of King Ferdinand VII to the throne in Spain the situation seemed favorable for a royalist offensive; thus, Toribio Montes, Captain general and Governor of Quito, began plans for an offensive to reconquer the Viceroyalty of New Granada. Montes’s first decision would be the removal of Field Marshall Aymerich from his post as commander of the army and governor of Popayán, as their relationship had become strained during Nariño’s campaign. Montes replaced him with Lieutenant Colonel Aparicio de Vidaurrazaga. On December 6, 1814, Vidaurrazaga departed with the army from Pasto and captured Popayán on December 29 with 550 men. Upon arrival at Popayán, he requested more troops from Montes and dispatched units to the north of Popayán.

Meanwhile the patriot army, the army of the south, had retreated north to the Cauca Valley. During the coming months the army would undergo an intense reorganization process as well as training troops with an emphasis on physical fitness, which consisted of long marches at double time for 2 hours each day starting at 5 am. Cabal also decided to do away with Spanish manual of arms and adopted the French one which was translated by Captain Liborio Mejia. The republican government approved of these methods and as such promoted the commander of the army José María Cabal from colonel to brigadier general, however despite these efforts’ problems such as desertion remained a serious problem for the patriots. By 1815 Cabal’s army had some 1,200 troops composed of 5 infantry battalions:

- Cundinamarca Battalion
- Socorro Battalion
- Cauca Battalion
- Antioquia Battalion
- Popayan Battalion

160 troops were cavalry, composed of the Veteran squadron and the Buga volunteer’s squadron. The army also had at its disposition two 4-pounder cannons and two falconet light cannons. The republican government also dispatched 3 distinguished officers to assist Cabal, those being the Quiteño Colonel Carlos de Montúfar and French Colonel Manuel Roergas de Serviez and French cavalry captain Honorato Dufour. The arrival of Dofour was a welcome addition, as he was considered the best cavalry officer in the army, meanwhile Serviez's arrival was less so, although Cabal recognized that he was an extremely competent and disciplined officer, he was hard to work with and arrogant.

== Battle ==
Vidaurrázaga wanting to continue his offensive requested permission from Montes in Quito and subsequently received his approval to commence operations. Prior to setting out, he received a letter with confidential orders from Montes that instructed him to "give no quarter to the enemy."

With everything order Vidauarrázaga then deployed his vanguard, under the command of Captain Mariano Cucalón, who had with him 616 troops along with two artillery pieces. The vanguard set out and soon occupied the town Piendamó and its surroundings to the north, and then took the town of Tunia, eventually reaching the vicinity of Ovejas, where there was an advanced position of Patriot troops.

The Spanish rearguard, composed of 400 men, and armed with two 4-pounder cannons, began their march on June 21 with Vidaurrázaga himself leaving Popayán on the 24th.

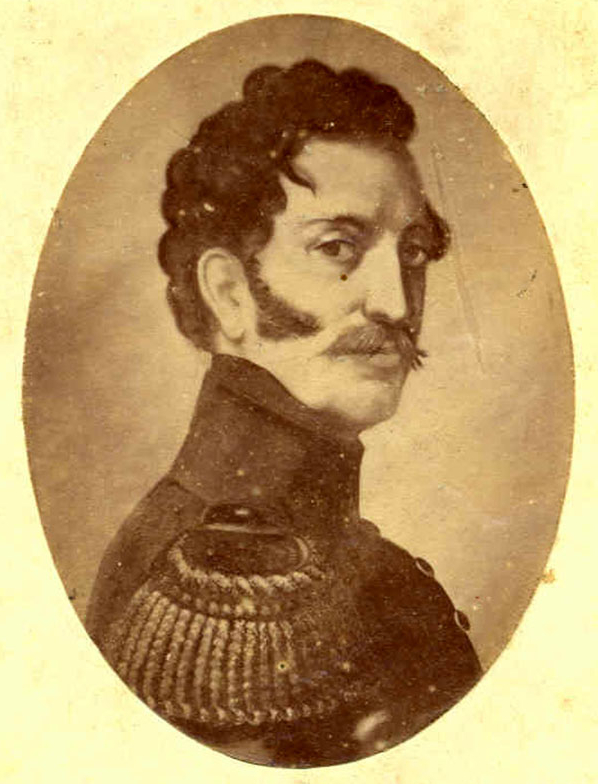
Brigadier General José María Cabal, commander of the independence army of the south.

The Royalist plan was to march to the Cauca Valley, meanwhile Lieutenant Colonel Delgado and the Lieutenant Governors of Iscuandé and Micay, Illera and Valverde, would march on the patriot troops of Dagua to take the rest of the province, and attract the attention of the Army of the South and thus make rapid progress in their offensive.

At Ovejas the patriots had placed an advance force composed of 300 troops of the Socorro and Antioquia battalion, there they engaged the royalists for 2 hours but eventually withdrew. Cabal had devised a plan if the royalists attacked Ovejas, it consisted of consecutive defensive lines that were meant to slow down his enemy and cause as much damage as possible and then lead them to a fortified position near the Palo River north of the town of Caloto. Vidaurrázaga upon seeing the patriots retreat and not knowing of their defense plan, thought their retreat meant he had defeated them and he pressed his advance.

At the Palo river the patriot forces had organized their position on the battlefield as follows: Advanced units were placed on the right bank of the river, then, at a short distance, a line of fortifications defended by troops and further back the battlefield, a plain, in which they had to form the battalions to face the enemy.

The Popayán battalion defended with 83 troops the most western steps, called Pilamus. On the day of the battle, the outposts were made up of the battalions, Popayán, on the left and Cazadores del Cauca, on the right, which were supported by 80 cavalry. Probably, outside of the artillery that participated in the battle, there were some other pieces in the fortifications because at midnight between the nights of July 4 to 5 a 4-pounder cannon arrived at the Palo field.

The patriot camp was organized in the same order in which the patriots had been training for combat, with the Cundinamarca battalion on the left, Socorro in the center, and Antioquía on the right flank.

The royalists arrived near the Patriot positions on July 4 and camped on the left bank of the Palo river, they then conducted a detailed reconnaissance survey of the Patriot positions. Vidaurrázaga then sent 2 scouts down river to look for a crossing where the entire army could cross and attack the Patriots while also avoiding their fortifications, they reported back to their commander that they had found one near a trail called Platanal which traversed through a small mountain, led to a ford of the river that allowed for a crossing with very little risk.

With this information Vidaurrázaga convened a meeting with his officers on the night of July 4 to plan their strategy. This strategy would consist of the placing the 4th company of Patía in front of the enemy to grab their attention while the royalist vanguard and rearguard divisions would conduct a left flanking movement.

As the royalists were planning their attack, so too were their patriot counterparts, Cabal convened a meeting with all of his officers. Colonel Serviez suggested moving the troops more towards the west, however Cabal disregarded this suggestion considering that the current area was favorable to the Patriot army with most of the other officers in agreement.

=== Commencement of the battle ===
The battle began around 5 am on July 5, when a column of royalist troops crossed the Palo river through a ford that lay west of the main crossing known as the Paso Real to avoid patriot defenses and attack their right flank. This caught the patriots by surprise, as they had not expected to be attacked on their right. At the same time, the royalists were also able to get across around 200 infantry and 150 horses through the main Paso Real which lay on the patriot's left flank and began combat with the Patriot outpost unit which was the Popayán battalion commanded by Captain Pedro Murgueitio who then alerted the other patriot units of the attack. The Popayán battalion positioned in some trenches maintained heavy fire over the royalists, buying time for the rest of the army to form up. After some time the Popayán battalion then subsequently withdrew to the main defense line where the Cundinamarca battalion was located allowing the royalists to cross the river. The rest of the patriot force, who had been waiting for the attack upon knowing where the main attack would occur took formation through drum commands. The royalists launched their attacks in a disorderly fashion while the patriots fought back while withdrawing to their main lines in an orderly and disciplined fashion. The Spanish continued advancing up until they reached musket range. On the patriot left flank, a Patriot cavalry squadron under the command of Captain Manuel José Solís attacked the advancing royalist troops, the charge was valiant however it was defeated and Captain Solís was killed near a Spanish cannon.

General Cabal directly commanded the battle. Cabal considered more favorable for the result, that the right wing retreat to the height, where the supply barracks were located, he ordered his assistant to communicate this instruction to the Quarter master. And as he saw that Serviez had arranged for Lieutenant Colonel Pedro Monsalve to advance to the left of the right wing with 50 men from the Cauca battalion, added to his battalion, for the withdrawal of the advanced posts, in such a way that the unit was between the enemy fires and those of his own artillery, ordered the immediate withdrawal of this battalion, The Royalist Commander, who was misinformed about the character of the enemy troops, was surprised when he saw the patriot units movements and discipline of their formations. He even praised them, writing after the battle that: “The opponents wait, make their fires and withdraw from ours, at the time I observed that five enemy columns were formed that made up greater forces than had been considered at all times”

In view of the opposing situation of organization and discipline of his army compared to that of the patriots, and appreciating from a distance the units that were going to disrupt his disorganized attack on a position prepared for defense, Vidaurrázaga hurriedly sent his aid-de-camp José Jaramillo, to inform the divisional commanders who stopped the movement, formed in battle, with the four pieces of artillery at the front, and appreciated the intentions of the enemy. But seeing that his order was not fulfilled, and rather, the disorganization was growing greater and that the voices of the commanders were only of advancement, without taking adequate training, or provisions conducive to success, he sent another of his assistants, Miguel Puente, to gather about the fulfillment of the order.

Meanwhile, Vidaurrázaga, personally ordered the attack of the fourth company of Patía on the patriot left. The attack of the Patian company, under the orders of Captain Joaquín de Paz, was faced by the Popayán battalion and Cundinamarca battalion.

The patriot right flank which faced the Pilamus crossing had also withdrawn their units to the main line of defense where battalions Socorro, Antioquía, and Cauca were in place with 3 artillery pieces behind along with the Buga Volunteer's cavalry squadron. The Royalists who they faced had managed to cross 700 infantry, 200 cazadores, and 40 dragoons along with artillery under the command of Lt. Colonel Soriano who was second in command of the royalist army. As they crossed the patriot artillery inflicted heavy damage on them. With the royalists on both the left and right of patriots now within musket range the order was given to the patriot army to conducts a simultaneous bayonet charge. Colonel Serviez who commanded the Socorro battalion and Colonel Montúfar, who commanded the entire sector to the right of the artillery, attacked with the Antioquia battalion. While on the left flank General Cabal and Captain Murgueitio charged with the Cundinamarca and Popayán battalions.

This simultaneous bayonet attack of struck a mortal blow to the royalists, as this attack occurred the patriot's accurate artillery fire that wreaked further havoc on the royalists. Ensign José María Espinosa, a standard bearer and grenadier who served in the Cundinamarca Battalion, wrote that:

"The hour had arrived to do battle with the enemy army. To the beat of the drums we advanced divided into 3 columns....the sound of musket fire was so lively and loud it was deafening, added to it was the incessant playing of war bands and drums. Since there was no wind the mass cloud of smoke blinded the view all around us."

When the bayonet charge occurred he noted

“It was such the impetus with which our people and the spirit and ardor with which they fought, that in a short time the royalist battalions were run over and undone, an operation that came to complete the cavalry very opportunely, to the Command of the Frenchman Dufaure."

During the charge, Colonel Serviez had his horse shot out from under him, but was able to get up and subsequently led the charge on foot. On the Patriot right flank the Buga Volunteer Squadron also entered the fray and striking the final blow to the royalist army as they struck down their enemy. While on the left Cabal and Murgueitio's charge decimated the Patia infantry company and its commander Captain Paz was killed in one of the trenches he had captured previously.

At half past eight in the morning, the Spanish army was in defeat and in most of their units there was intense panic as they tried to frantically cross the river back to their positions on the south bank of the Palo river. While some companies began their withdrawal in an orderly fashion until they were reached by the Republican troops who were in their pursuit. The withdrawal soon became a disorganized retreat as the royalist fled south in direction of Popayán.

== Aftermath ==
General Cabal following his troops who gave chase to the fleeing royalists, halted at half past eleven in the morning, and from Cascabel Hill, sent a letter to the governor of the province, Francisco Cabal, informing him of the victory writing:

"The arms of the republic have triumphed, today at 5 in the morning, the enemy presented himself with much ferocity and crossed the river. Our officers and soldiers have behaved like good republicans"

The battle was a decisive victory for the patriots, allowing them to recapture Popayán and pacifying the Cauca Province for one year.

The battle had been disaster for the royalists who suffered 300 dead and wounded, including the loss of 15 officers such as the second in command Lt. Colonel Francisco Soriano, Commander Joaquin de la Paz, and Lt. Javier de la Torre who was the commander of the 4th Patia infantry company. More than 500 royalists were taken prisoner along with the capture of 4 artillery pieces, 800 rifles, 25,000 paper cartridges, and other supplies.

The patriots on their part suffered 47 soldiers and 2 officers killed and 121 wounded. Special mention was given to cavalry Captain Manuel José Solís who died leading the cavalry charge with General Cabal mentioning in his report that "he died with the most heroic courage by falling on a[n] enemy artillery piece, with only one soldier to accompany him." The other officer who lost his life in the battle was Lieutenant José María Jaramillo of the Antioquia battalion.

José María Caballero wrote in his diary that the news of General Cabal's victory at the Palo River reached Santa Fe on July 18, his diary entry also mentioned that "they took 600 rifles, 400 prisoners, with 300 dead. Wow! This is good."
