= Manuel Roergas Serviez =

French soldier and adventurer

Emmanuel Roërgas de Serviez
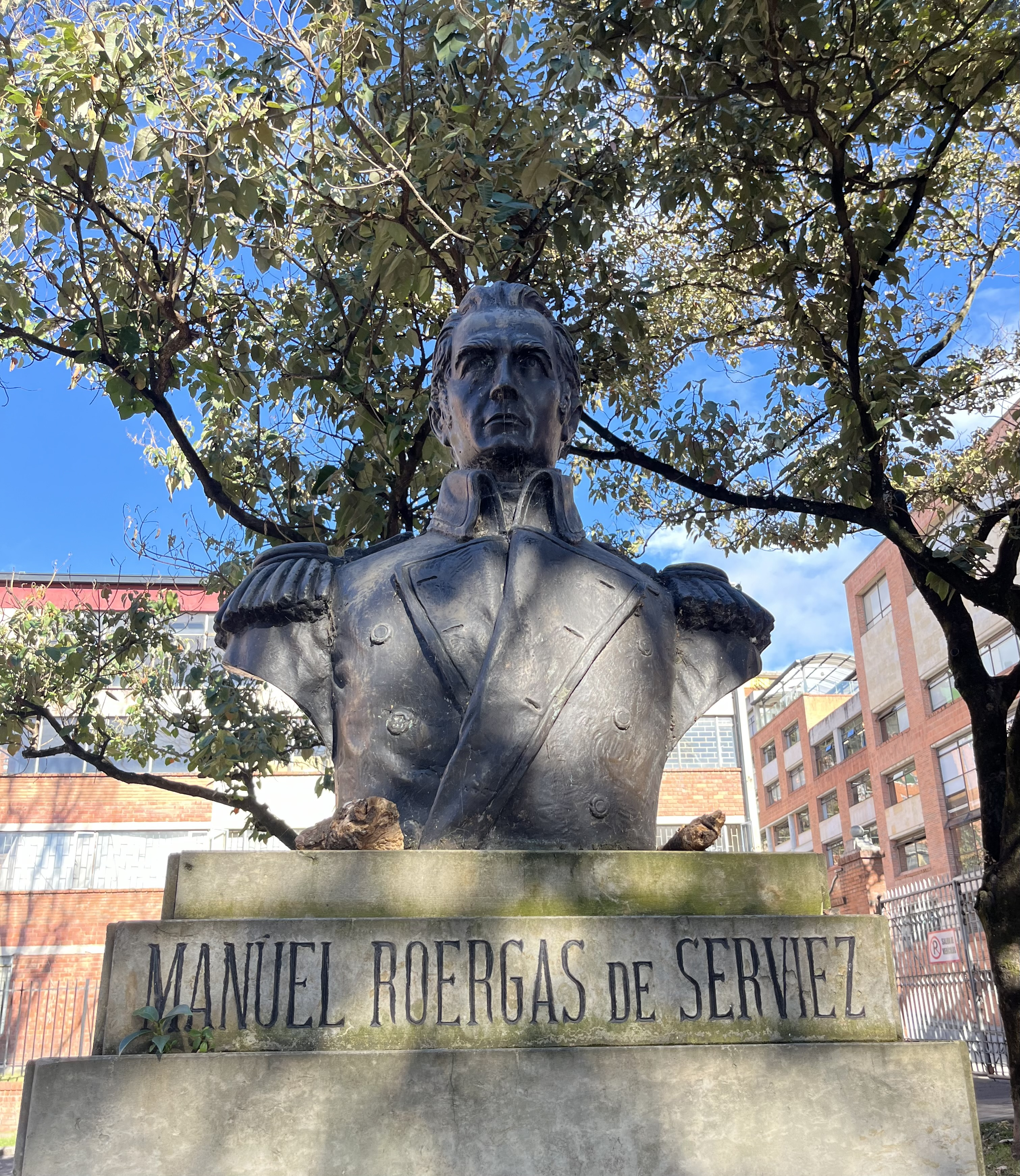
- A bronze bust of Serviez located in Paris Park, Bogotá, Colombia.
- Born: May 16, 1785; Cutry, Meurthe-et-Moselle, Kingdom of France
- Died: November 30, 1816 (aged 31); Apure, Venezuela
- Military career
- Allegiance: France until 1809; United Provinces of New Granada from 1813
- Branch: Grande Armée; Army of the Union
- Service years: 1798–1809 (France); 1813–1816 (New Granada)
- Rank: Brigadier General
- Units: Army of Italy, Army of the South
- Commands: Army of the North
- Conflicts: Colombian Independence War: Battle of the Palo River (1815); Battle of Hato Yagual

Emmanuel Roërgas de Serviez (May 16, 1785 – November 30, 1816), known by the Hispanicized name of Manuel Roergas de Serviez, was a French soldier and adventurer who participated in the wars of independence in South America.

Born into French nobility, Serviez served in various units of the French Army during the Revolutionary and Napoleonic Wars, attaining the rank of lieutenant. In 1809, he deserted and later joined the independence movements in South America. After briefly serving in Venezuela, he fled to New Granada following the fall of the First Republic of Venezuela. There, he was appointed lieutenant colonel in the army of the United Provinces and tasked with training troops using French military doctrine.

In 1813, Serviez was accused of conspiring against General Antonio Nariño but was acquitted in 1814. That same year, he co-founded a military academy in Medellín with Francisco José de Caldas, mentoring future Colombian general José María Córdova. He later participated in the Battle of Bogotá under Simón Bolívar and was appointed chief of staff under General José María Cabal, playing a decisive role in the Patriot victory at the Battle of the Palo River in 1815.

Amid the Spanish reconquest in 1816, President Camilo Torres Tenorio promoted Serviez to brigadier general and commander of the army. Realizing his forces could not withstand the Spanish offensive, he led a strategic retreat to the eastern plains, preserving key military leadership, including Santander and Córdova. His forces joined those of José Antonio Páez and took part in the Battle of Hato Yagual.

Soon after, while seeking rest due to poor health, Serviez was murdered under mysterious circumstances.

== Early life ==
Emmanuel Roërgas de Serviez was born on May 16, 1785, and baptized on June 6, 1785. He hailed from a lineage of minor nobility who traditionally served in the military, his father was Emmanuel-Gervais Roergas de Serviez, then a lieutenant in the Royal-Roussillon Regiment. His mother was Marie-Henriette de Trelliard, the two married on December 25, 1784, in Cutry, Meurthe-et-Moselle, her family was dedicated to industry and public affairs.

Her father, François de Trelliard, was described as a "noble patrician of Parme, secretary of the cabinet with the approval of His Royal Highness the Lord Infante of Parme, and former mayor of agriculture and commerce in the states of His Royal Highness." Among the witnesses of the marriage ceremony was the future General Anne-François-Charles Trelliard, the bride's brother.

== Military career ==
Serviez enlisted into the French Revolutionary Army during the government of the directorate and received the rank of lieutenant in 1798 and was assigned to the general staff of the Army of Italy.

He was a later an aid-de-camp to his maternal uncle General Anne-François-Charles Trelliard. He was then a chasseur in the 11th regiment, by 1800 he requested to be transferred to the colonies, a request that was denied. In 1803 he was a sublieutenant in the 7th Crussaires.

He took an absence of leave in 1805 to marry Eugenia Tessier de Margueritte with whom he had two children. In 1806 he returned to the army as a lieutenant in the Mounted Chasseurs of the Imperial Guard and was assigned to the army of Spain in 1808 taking part in the fighting there. He was wounded at the Battle of Vimeiro and returned to France.

In 1809 Serviez deserted the French army and fled to England with his mistress and later ended up in the United States.

=== New Granada ===
In 1811 Serviez traveled to Venezuela and joined General Francisco de Miranda's Venezuelan patriot army that had begun its war of independence from Spain. With the fall of the 1st republic of Venezuela to Spanish forces, Serviez fled to neighboring New Granada along with other officers from Venezuela arriving in Cartagena de Indias. New Granada had also declared independence from Spain and commissioned many of the exiled Venezuelan officers into their army to augment their forces against the Spanish royalists. The federalist congress of the United Provinces of New Granada commissioned Serviez into the Neogranadine army of the union, as a lieutenant colonel, and tasked him with training the troops in the south of the country.

In 1813 Serviez was deployed to the south of the country with a number of troops to assist the beleaguered forces of the army of the south which had been pushed back from the provincial capital of Popayán all the way north to the Cauca Valley as a result of an offensive launched by Spanish Brigadier Juan de Sámano. In June 1813 Serviez arrived in the town of Cartago in the Cauca valley where the remnants of the army of the south some 150 troops had retreated to. Jose Hilario Lopez who was one of the troops of the army of the south and later future president of New Granada, described his first encounter with the French officer who attempted to rally the demoralized troops in his limited Spanish and to defend the town from the Spanish advance. There Serviez trained the troops in the French manual of arms, however his strict discipline led to many of them deserting, leaving him with only around 400 men, Serviez and his troops waited in Cartago for the promised reinforcements from Sante Fe which never came, while this happened Samano's troops slowly made their way north from Cali. Samano's troops and Serviez's troops clashed near Cartago soon after in a defeat that forced the patriots to retreat Northeast towards the Quindio road.

Serviez and his battered troops retreated to Ibagué, arriving there in July 1813, during the difficult retreat he had been reduced to 20 officers and only a handful soldiers. Upon arriving to Ibague they were met by Colonel Jose Maria Cabal who was in charge of relieving them, Cabal who had lived in Paris for time in his youth communicated in French with Serviez who gave him a report of their actions and had also praised the conduct of the young cadet Jose Hilario Lopez in battle.

=== Nariño's Southern Campaign ===
While in Ibague, Cabal tasked Serviez with recruiting and training new troops that would be destined for the upcoming campaign to liberate Popayán and the south of the country led by Lieutenant General Antonio Nariño. Serviez along with English Captain Willam Henry Virgo created a cavalry squadron of lancers that would be part of the campaign. After a few months, Serviez led this cavalry group to the town of Purificación in September 1813, where General Nariño had ordered that the rendezvous point be so that the various battalions and troops from other parts of the country would gather to form the army. Now joined up with the bulk of the army, they marched south to the town of La Plata arriving there on October 25. La Plata was chosen as Nariño was still waiting on the troops coming from the Antioquia Province, in the meantime the troops already there underwent instruction and training. Serviez continued as commander of the 3rd battalion but was also placed as the cavalry instructor for the whole army. As instructor his training was harsh on the troops as his expected nothing less than fierce discipline, which gained him notoriety and much dislike among the troops and officers. Serviez alongside Spanish Colonel Manuel Cortés Campomanes proposed to Nariño that the army do away with the Spanish military doctrine they had been following and adopt the French one in its place, which would require retraining the troops to adopt the new formations and tactics as well as adopting bugle commands. Nariño gave his approval of this initiative and the two officers went to work on implementing the new doctrine.

Despite the assistance and know-how that was provided to the army by Serviez and the other foreign officers like him, there was an air of distrust from the native Neogranadine troops towards them. Serviez's harsh training and arrogant attitude when it came to his harsh criticism of the quality Neogranadine officers, did not gain him any favors. This would culminate with the arrest of both Serviez and Campomanes after they were accused of by Nariño and his general staff of trying to cause insubordination among the troops and attempting to remove him as commander of the army to take control. The supposed evidence behind this accusation was dubious at best, and many historians have criticized Nariño's handling of the situation citing that one of the possible reasons he arrested them was to get rid of the two because they questioned his leadership as well as the fact that they were part of army of the federalist congress that despite working together to prepare this campaign was still distrusted by Nariño. In December while Narino and the army of the union began their march to Popayan and began their campaign, Serviez and Campomanes were transported as prisoners to Santfe to face a military tribunal for their perceived crimes. Nariño's campaign while successful as first, would end in disaster with many historians arguing that not having present two experienced officers such as Serviez and Campomanes in their ranks contributed to the defeat.

The arrested officers arrived in Santafe on January 8, 1814, and on January 18, their case ended with military tribunal ruling in their favor and allowing them to rejoin the army. At the end of that month both officers left the city, with Campomanes traveling to Cartagena, meanwhile Serviez was transferred to Medellín in the Antioquia Province where the provincial authorities had hired him to become an instructor at the military academy being established there. At this short lived academy Serviez worked alongside scientist Francisco José de Caldas who had been tasked with teaching and creating a military engineer corps. At the academy one of the new cadets caught his eye, this being 15-year-old José María Cordova, of whom Serviez took a liking to and became his mentor, eventually naming Cordova as his aid-de-camp.

Serviez was then called up by the congress to join General Simón Bolívar's army that was tasked with subjugating the centralist Cundinamarca state into the United Provinces of New Granada where he would participate in the Battle of Bogotá.

After the federalist victory, Serviez was sent to join the army of the south under the command of Brigadier General José María Cabal to assist him in his defense of the Cauca Valley from a royalist offensive. At the Battle of the Palo River, Serviez played an important role leading the Patriot center where the artillery was placed during the battle, and personally leading the combined bayonet charge on foot as his horse was shot out from under him. The victory halted the Spanish offensive in the south and with 300 men Serviez gave chase to the retreating Spanish eventually retaking the city of Popayán.

Despite the victory at El Palo, the 1st republic was plunged into crisis as in August 1815 the 10,000 strong Spanish Expeditionary Army under the command of Lieutenant General Pablo Morillo arrived on the Neogranadine shores. This would mark the beginning of the Spanish reconquest of New Granada, with the Spanish laying siege to Cartagena that same month, in October another Spanish army invaded from Venezuela. Due to Serviez's ample military experience, he was called back to Santafé where President Camilo Torres named him commander of all the armies of the reserve army.

By the beginning of 1816, the military situation of the Republic had deteriorated dramatically. On February 22 and 23, the Army of the North, under the command of General Custodio García Rovira, was decisively defeated by Spanish Colonel Sebastián de la Calzada at the Battle of Cachirí. As a result, the northern region of the country effectively fell under the control of the invading Spanish forces.

In the aftermath of this defeat, President Torres, shortly before resigning from office, entrusted Colonel Serviez with the supreme command of the Army of the Union on March 7, 1816. Serviez accepted the appointment, but on the condition that he be promoted to the rank of brigadier general and that the then-Secretary of War, Andrés Rodríguez—whom Serviez considered unfit for the position—be removed from office. These conditions were accepted by the government. Serviez subsequently traveled to the town Puente Real de Vélez, where, on March 22, where he formally assumed command of the remnants of the Army of the North. At that time, Colonel Francisco de Paula Santander retained his position as Serviez’s second-in-command.

Although the government of the Union intended for Serviez to engage the enemy in a decisive pitched battle to halt their advance, such a strategy proved unfeasible. The Republican forces numbered only around 1,200 men, poorly armed and inadequately clothed. Furthermore, significant quantities of weapons and ammunition had been lost during the defeat at Cachirí—an issue Serviez made explicit in a letter to the Secretary of War dated April 1 where he stated:

"The destitution and misery in which I have found this army reduced is indescribable. Your Excellency may imagine the extent of it following a defeat such as that at Cachirí—particularly considering that, even before the battle, the troops had not received proper clothing for at least six months. There are soldiers who, lacking both jackets and shirts, are covered only by their blankets—an image that no compassionate commander, one who values discipline, can witness with indifference. It is nearly impossible to instill discipline among soldiers who are naked and deprived of even the most basic necessities for survival. Your Excellency must be persuaded that our soldiers are among the most virtuous any nation has ever possessed. Despite their nakedness and ongoing hardships, they have resisted repeated attempts by the enemy to lure them away from our ranks—an enemy they see fully clothed and regularly paid. Yet their moral strength has proven greater than these enticements, which would surely have seduced and dazzled others less steadfast than they."

=== Retreat to the Llanos ===
Shortly after dispatching that letter, Serviez devised a strategic plan to withdraw the Army of the Union to the province of Casanare, located in the Llanos or eastern plains region of New Granada. His objective was to preserve the remnants of the Republican forces, which had been severely diminished. Serviez believed that retreating to the vast and inhospitable terrain of the Llanos would provide a tactical advantage, allowing his troops to engage in guerrilla warfare to gradually wear down the enemy. This strategy, he hoped, would buy time to reorganize and rebuild the army into a force capable of confronting the Spanish in a more conventional engagement. On April 2, Serviez began the initial phase of his withdrawal, his first course of action was protecting the retreat with a squadron of dismounted Dragonos. He ordered them to cut the bridges over Suárez River from Moniquirá to the Monte de la Paja road and to make the roads as unusable as soon as possible, this order was executed with great discipline. Soon after the army departed the town by taking the route that went through the towns of Chiquinquirá, Ubaté, Lenguazaque and Chocontá.

Upon arriving in Chiquinquirá, the Army of the Union had been bolstered by new recruits and reinforcements to a total of around 2000 troops (1,000 infantry 1000 cavalry) and 4 artillery pieces. Their presence in the town was brief as the rapid advance of the Spanish troops coming from the north forced Serviez to accelerate the retreat and they departed in good order marching in the direction of Chocontá. However, before leaving Chiquinquirá, Serviez ordered his troops to take out of the town chapel the painting of ‘’Our Lady Virgin of Chiquinquira’’ and take the painting with them. This was an attempt by Serviez to use the powerful religious image of Our Lady of Chiquinquirá to compromise the religious spirit of the peoples in favor of the cause of the Republic and as way to raise the morale of his battered and demoralized troops.

The army continued its withdrawal, eventually arriving in Chocontá. By that time, news of General Serviez’s decision to retreat toward the Llanos had reached the newly appointed President of New Granada, José Fernández Madrid. In response, President Madrid and his Secretary of War, José María del Castillo y Rada, issued a series of formal communications ordering Serviez to halt his withdrawal. The executive leadership intended for Serviez to redirect his forces southward to Popayán, where they were to unite with the Army of the South in an effort to consolidate Republican military strength.

Serviez, however, refused to alter his course of action. In his reply, he reaffirmed his intention to continue toward the Llanos de Casanare, arguing not only that it was the most viable strategic option, but also that it would provide greater security for the President of the Union and the Guardia de Honor, the armed corps tasked with protecting the national authority. This unit, composed of officers and soldiers from various sovereign provinces of the Union, operated under the direct command of the executive branch. Serviez asserted that relocating this corps to the Llanos would better ensure its preservation.

At that critical juncture, Serviez—an experienced and pragmatic military leader—demonstrated a strategic vision that was considerably more grounded in the military realities at that moment than the directive issued by President Fernández Madrid. A march to Popayán would have been tantamount to suicide; even with the combined forces of the northern and southern armies, the Republicans would have been incapable of defending themselves against a two-pronged Spanish assault. From the north, Colonel Warleta had already begun advancing through the province of Antioquia, while from the south, royalist forces from Pasto, reinforced by troops from the Viceroyalty of Peru and the Royal Audiencia of Quito, posed an imminent and overwhelming threat to the Army of the Union.Despite these reasoned counterarguments, President Madrid remained unwavering in his position and refused to reconsider his directive.

As a result, the government sought to intervene by directing a letter—dated April 23 and authored by Secretary of War José María del Castillo Rada—to Colonel Francisco de Paula Santander, the second-in-command of the Army. In the letter, Santander was instructed to depose General Serviez from command should he refuse to comply with the government's directive to lead the army southward. Furthermore, the government authorized Santander to assume command himself and execute the retreat to the southern provinces. Despite the added incentive of a promotion to the rank of general, Santander declined to carry out the order, refusing to remove Serviez from his position.

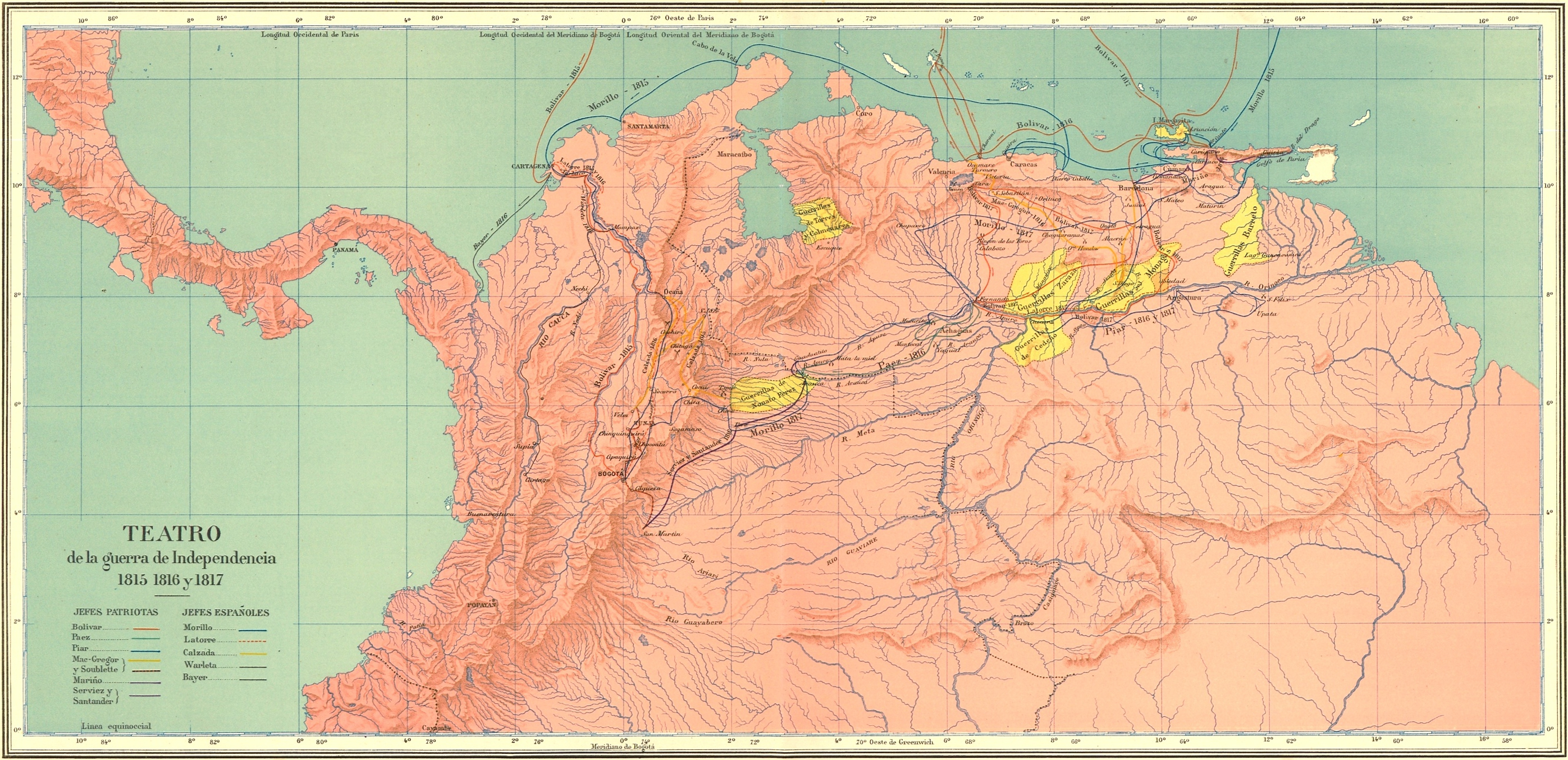
Map Depicting the campaigns of the Colombian War of Independence, during the years 1815 to 1817. The route that Serviez's forces took is labeled.

President Madrid, unable to compel General Serviez to withdraw toward the southern provinces, departed the capital on the night of May 2, accompanied by other members of the Republican government. At that time, Serviez had garrisoned his forces in Usaquén. On May 4, at approximately 4:30 p.m., he received intelligence that a Spanish force of 3,000 troops under the command of Brigadier Miguel de la Torre and Colonel Sebastián de la Calzada had arrived in Zipaquirá.

In response to this development, Serviez hastened the Republican retreat. His vanguard passed through Santafé later that same night, and the remainder of the army followed the next day, proceeding along the road to Cáqueza. The column was heavily encumbered, transporting a substantial quantity of baggage, over two hundred head of cattle, and a religious artifact—the painting of the Virgin of Chiquinquirá—secured within a wooden chest.

By the afternoon of May 6, around 4:30 p.m., the Republican forces reached the small town of Chipaque. However, during the preceding night, the army had suffered a significant wave of desertions. Of the approximately 2,000 infantry and cavalry with which it had set out, no more than 600 infantrymen and 30 cavalry remained. The majority had deserted, including numerous officers, driven by fear of Spanish retaliation.

The remnants of the force, lacking sufficient draft animals and unable to continue transporting their heavy materiel, were compelled to abandon their artillery and other equipment, discarding them into nearby ravines and mountain gullies along the route. That same day May 6, the Spanish troops of Brigadier Miguel de la Torre entered Santafé, he immediately ordered Captain Antonio Gómez, commander of the "loyal carabineros of Fernando VII’’, to take his unit along with a company of Cazadores from the Numancia infantry regiment to chase after Serviez.

In the following days, Serviez and his army marched through the eastern Andes mountain range via the royal road leading to the town of Cáqueza. Already plagued by desertion, the march proved difficult—the road was narrow, clinging to the mountainside on one edge, while the other dropped steeply into a ravine hundreds of meters below.

The situation worsened on May 9, when Captain Gómez and his column caught up with the Republican rearguard near the Alto de Ubatoque. A light skirmish ensued, but the patriots managed to evade their pursuers and continued their retreat through the Quebradahonda forest.

During their flight, they abandoned a chest containing the painting of the Virgin of Chiquinquirá in a hut near Sáname, where a group of clergymen resided. The clergy later transported the painting back to Santafé.

On May 11, the army reached the Cabuya crossing of the Negro River. The timing posed a serious problem—due to the winter rains, the river was severely swollen, and the only means of crossing was a narrow suspension bridge, which made the passage slow and hazardous.

As the army attempted to cross, they were suddenly attacked again by Gómez's Spanish forces, triggering a fierce three-hour battle. The encounter was nearly disastrous for the patriots: many soldiers were killed, captured, or scattered, and their entire supply train—including luggage, weapons, ammunition, and even the archive—was lost. Serviez himself was ultimately forced to sever the suspension bridge with his sabre to prevent further enemy pursuit. However, by that point, only approximately 200 officers and soldiers had successfully crossed to the other side. The remainder of the army, now significantly diminished in strength and morale, and having suffered substantial logistical losses, found itself in an even more precarious condition than before. In this depleted state, the remnants of the force resumed their retreat toward San Martín.

The retreat continued through the village of Apiay, with the Spanish forces still in pursuit—now led directly by Brigadier de la Torre. In an effort to delay the advancing enemy and hinder their mobility, Serviez implemented scorched earth tactics, systematically destroying or removing all usable resources from the areas along the retreat path. His objective was to deprive the Spanish of access to local provisions and supplies that might otherwise sustain their campaign through the plains.

This strategy proved highly effective in obstructing the enemy’s advance. De la Torre himself acknowledged the severity of the situation in a letter to General Morillo, stating: “Wherever I go, everything has been ruined by Serviez, with the result that we have no resources left.”

After four weeks of marching eastward, the exhausted and diminished forces under General Serviez—accompanied by a number of civilians—arrived in the provincial capital of Pore on June 23. Fewer than 300 individuals reached the city, a figure that included civilians, officers, cavalry, and infantry—of whom no more than 56 were regular foot soldiers. Although Serviez intended to remain in Pore for at least a month to recover from the severe hardships endured during the arduous retreat, the Republican forces remained under active pursuit by de la Torre and his troops.

General Morillo, an experienced military officer, recognized that the most significant threat to Spanish control in New Granada lay in the potential for a sustained insurgency rooted in the Eastern Plains—a region where European-style military operations were notoriously difficult. Consequently, he reprimanded de la Torre and ordered him to take all necessary measures to annihilate the Republican remnants before they could regroup and reorganize. De la Torre's forces eventually occupied Pore on July 10; however, by that time, Serviez and his troops had already vacated the city.

In the prior weeks, Serviez had departed Pore and continued eastwards into the vast eastern plains. On June 29, Serviez and his army were near the Guachiría lagoon some 2 or 3 leagues east of Pore when they encountered a Spanish cavalry unit under the command Colonel Manuel Villavicencio who had been personally sent by Morillo from San Gil with a squadron of the ‘’Hussars of Fernando VII’’ this unit had been dispatched all the way back in March and had crossed the Andes through a different pass. Serviez was forced to skirmish with them, the combat was long and only came to an end thanks to the darkness of the night which forced the Spanish to withdraw from the field and head towards the mountain range. With this skirmish over, the path was now clear for Serviez and his men.

Three days later, on July 1, 1816, General Serviez finally found refuge in Chire, where he joined forces with Venezuelan General Rafael Urdaneta and his contingent of 400 cavalry. The strategic retreat, which had commenced on April 2, had at last come to an end. Of the original 2,000 troops and four artillery pieces under Serviez’s command, only 56 infantrymen and 150 cavalry remained, in addition to the civilians who had accompanied them. Despite the immense losses, severe hardships, and numerous obstacles encountered along the way, the retreat ultimately achieved a critical objective. Through his leadership and persistence, General Manuel de Serviez succeeded in preserving a core group of highly valuable Neogranadine officers—including Francisco de Paula Santander, Antonio Morales, Tomás Montilla, José María Vergara, and others—who would later play significant roles in the continuation of the independence movement.

=== Campaign in the Llanos ===
Following their arrival in the Llanos and their union with General Rafael Urdaneta’s forces, the beleaguered patriot troops withdrew deeper into the vast expanses of the eastern plains. In the sparsely populated Llanos Orientales of New Granada, three distinct Patriot contingents operated independently of one another. The first was under the command of Venezuelan Colonel Miguel Valdés, leader of the Casanare forces—commonly referred to as the Army of the East—whose primary base of operations was located in the town of Guasdualito. The second group was led by Colonel Nepomuceno Moreno, a native of Casanare and the region’s acting governor. The third contingent was under the command of General Rafael Urdaneta. As previously noted, the remnants of the Neogranadine forces under General Manuel Serviez and Colonel Francisco de Paula Santander, following their strategic retreat, had joined this final group.

The presence of multiple, independently operated commands created a fragmented and disorganized military landscape, resembling a state of near-anarchy due to the absence of a unified chain of command. In an effort to resolve this critical issue, Colonel Valdés proposed a meeting among the various commanders to be held in the town of Arauca, situated on the Arauca River at the frontier between Venezuela and New Granada. Generals Serviez and Urdaneta consented to the proposal and designated Colonel Santander as their representative.

The meeting convened on July 16 in Arauca, where the assembled delegates established a governing junta. During the proceedings, Colonel Valdés declared his inability to continue in command due to deteriorating health. The junta responded by unanimously electing Fernando Serrano, former governor of Pamplona, as president. Francisco Javier Yáñez, a lawyer of considerable reputation, was appointed as Secretary General and Minister, while Generals Serviez and Urdaneta were named advisors to the civilian government.

One of the junta’s first decisions was to designate a supreme military commander. Following a vote, Colonel Francisco de Paula Santander was appointed to lead the unified army. His command, however, was brief—lasting only two months—during which time Patriot forces continued their retreat eastward, ultimately crossing into the Apure region of Venezuela as Spanish forces pressed forward in an attempt to expel them from the Llanos.

In September 1816, Lieutenant Colonel José Antonio Páez assumed command of the army, despite holding a lower rank than Santander. Demonstrating a commitment to the collective cause, Santander accepted the decision and subordinated himself to Páez’s leadership. Upon consolidating his authority, Páez took control not only of the military forces but also of the provisional civilian government under President Serrano, whom he instructed to relinquish his administrative duties. This transition resulted in General Serviez’s removal from his position as governmental advisor.

Páez then undertook a major reorganization of the Patriot forces, dividing the army into three cavalry divisions. The first was placed under the command of General Urdaneta, the second under General Serviez, and the third under Colonel Santander.

By the end of September, Páez initiated an offensive campaign. His forces advanced toward the town of Achaguas, where the Spanish had stationed a substantial contingent. On October 8, 1816, the Patriot army engaged Spanish cavalry forces under Colonel Francisco López at the Battle of El Yagual. General Serviez and his brigade were ordered to charge the enemy—a maneuver they executed successfully in coordination with the other Patriot units. The battle, marked by intense and bloody combat, concluded in a decisive victory for Páez’s Army of Apure.

== Death ==
Shortly after the victory at Hato Yagual, Serviez, who had been complaining of health issues, retired—with General Páez's permission—to a small estate owned by a woman named Presentación, located in an area known as "El Chorrerón," about one league from Achaguas, in order to recover from his fatigue. In the early hours of the night on November 30, 1816, four men appeared at the door claiming to be messengers from the army with orders for the general to report immediately to the camp. They then led him to a nearby forest, where he was assassinated.

Many suspected that the murder had been instigated by Páez himself, as part of a maneuver to consolidate his leadership amid the struggle for control over the combined Venezuelan and New Granadan army. Among those who supported this theory was José María Córdova, who went so far as to hold Páez solely responsible for the death of his mentor. He expressed this view in a letter addressed to General Francisco de Paula Santander in 1826, in which he referred to Páez in disparaging terms, stating:

"What good can be expected from someone who ordered the assassination of General Serviez, who repeatedly disobeyed the Liberator during the campaigns of '18 and '19?"

However, no concrete evidence has ever been found to support this theory. An alternative hypothesis suggests that the men had been following the army with the intent of robbing Serviez of his money. Upon learning of the assassination, General Páez claimed to have ordered “the most thorough efforts to discover the whereabouts of the murderers.” Nevertheless, the investigation proved fruitless, as the only eyewitness was unable to identify the attackers, and no further information ever emerged that could clarify the identity of those responsible. Páez maintained that the murderers had most likely been shadowing the army with the intention of robbing Serviez. In his autobiography, published in 1867, he referred to the crime in the following terms:

"In those times, when there were so many men roaming the countryside, not belonging to the army, it was unwise for the general to have distanced himself from it—and even more so considering he had plenty of enemies who had followed him from New Granada. Among us, he had none, as he had, so to speak, just arrived on our soil and had conducted himself admirably in the action at Yagual."

Most historians—if not all—have dismissed the idea of Páez's involvement in the death of Serviez, either as the intellectual author or as an accomplice, concluding that the motive was simply to rob the general of his money.

== Legacy ==
Although Serviez has often been forgotten, he is considered one of the heroes of the Colombian War of Independence. The National Army of Colombia's 20th airborne battalion based in the city of Apiay, in the Meta department is named after him in his honor.

In 1966 the Colombian Academy of History erected a bust of Serviez in commemoration of the 100th anniversary of his death, this bust is located in Bogotá on Calle 61 near the University of La Salle in the Chapinero district.
