= Manuel de Bernardo Álvarez del Casal =

Criollo figure in New Granada (1743–1816)

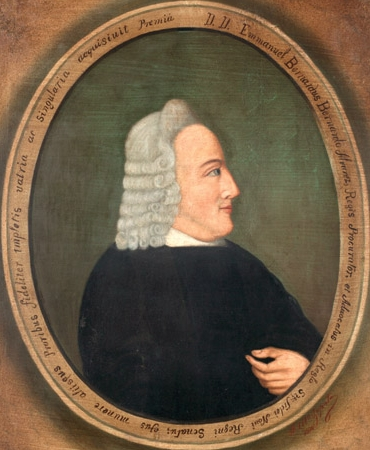

Governor President of the State of Cundinamarca
- In office May 14, 1814 – December 12, 1814*
- Preceded by: Antonio Nariño
- Succeeded by: Camilo Torres Tenorio

Personal details
- Born: May 21, 1743 Santafé de Bogotá, Colombia
- Died: September 10, 1816 (aged 73) Santafé de Bogotá, Colombia
- Party: Centralist
- Spouse: Josefa del Casal y Freiría
- Deposed by the Federalists.

Manuel de Bernardo Álvarez del Casal (May 21, 1743 in Bogotá – September 10, 1816 in Bogotá) was an influential Criollo figure in New Granada at the time of the independence movement. He occupied several important positions in the rebel government. He was also the uncle of Antonio Nariño, a forerunner of independence. He served as president of the rebel State of Cundinamarca in 1814.

== Background ==
Álvarez' father, Bernardo Álvarez, was a lawyer of the Royal Council of Castile before he was named prosecutor of the Royal Audiencia of Bogotá. He arrived in Bogotá with his family in 1736. Manuel was born there a few years later. Born into an aristocratic family.

His sister Catalina married Vicente Nariño y Vásquez, the accountant for Bogotá. Their son, Antonio Nariño y Alvarez del Casal, is considered the forerunner of Colombian independence.

Álvarez studied jurisprudence and the humanities at the Colegio de San Bartolomé from 1762 to 1768. In the latter year he received a doctorate in theology and humanities and became a professor of civil and ecclesiastical law. He was admitted to practice law before the Audiencia.

Also in 1768 he married Josefa Lozano de Peralta, fourth daughter of the first Marqués de San Jorge. This marriage allied him not only with the Marqués's family, one of the richest in the capital, but also with many other rich and influential families of the colony.

From 1768 until the Cry of Independence on July 20, 1810, Álvarez worked for the Spanish administration in Bogotá as an accountant in various departments. Beginning in 1789 he was a member of the city council of Bogotá. On August 11, 1793 his father-in-law, Jorge Miguel Lozano, was arrested and imprisoned in Cartagena, where he died. The following year his nephew Nariño published a Spanish translation of the Rights of Man and was also arrested.

Álvarez started with this family a bureaucratic dynasty that lasted until the 1810s.

== The Cry of Independence ==
At the time of the Cry of Independence in 1810, Álvarez was a member of the city council, and in that capacity he signed the Declaration of Independence. He became part of the Supreme Governing Junta, presided over by José Miguel Pey de Andrade, and on July 26 Álvarez signed the document withdrawing recognition from the Council of Regency in Spain. He was named to the treasury section of the Junta, and also began editing the periodical Aviso al Público (Warning to the Public).

He used these two positions to agitate for the release of his nephew, who was still a prisoner in Cartagena. In spite of much opposition, Nariño was released, and arrived back in the capital on December 8, 1810.

== The Supreme Congress ==
The Junta was made up of relatives and in-laws of the Marqués de San Jorge, but it exercised control only in the capital of the viceroyalty. An opposition movement developed in Tunja under the guidance of Camilo Torres y Tenorio, who pressed for a federal system of government. On November 6, 1810, a Supreme Congress of the six provinces was summoned to resolve these differences. Delegates were Andrés Rosillo of El Socorro, Camilo Torres of Pamplona, Ignacio Herrera of Nóvita, León Armero of Mariquita, Manuel Campos of Neiva and Álvarez of Bogotá. Álvarez was named president.

The Congress assembled on December 22, and on Álvarez' nomination chose Nariño as secretary, but it made little progress in adopting a form of government. It was soon replaced by a constituent congress, which created the State of Cundinamarca with Jorge Tadeo Lozano de Peralta, brother-in-law of Álvarez, as its first president (March 26, 1811 - September 19, 1811).

== The State of Cundinamarca ==
Álvarez and Nariño now joined together to defend the centralist system and to press for the resignation of Lozano, using the periodical La Bagatela to state their case. Lozano did resign, and Nariño assumed the presidency. Shortly thereafter he became dictator (September 21, 1811 to August 19, 1813).

Nevertheless, Nariño was unable to consolidate power throughout the viceroyalty. Tunja continued in strong opposition. On October 4, 1812 in Villa de Leiva, a federalist congress met. Álvarez was one of two delegates from Cundinamarca. He so ardently defended the centralist positions of his nephew, that the congress ordered both delegates from Cundinamarca imprisoned.

Meanwhile, two generals ordered by Nariño to arrest opponents of his centralist system, instead defected to the federalists. Together with Camilo Torres they attacked Bogotá on January 9, 1813. The attack was repulsed. On July 16, 1813, the constituent congress, with Álvarez continuing as president, declared Cundinamarca unconditionally independent of Spain and under no sovereignty but that of God and the people.

During this turmoil, a Spanish force under Juan Sámano invaded the territory from the south. Nariño resigned the dictatorship to take personal control of the defense of the insurgency, leaving his uncle Álvarez in charge of the government (May 14, 1814 - December 12, 1814). Nariño left the capital on September 21, 1814 on his Southern Campaign, with the hope of taking Quito, and perhaps even Lima, from the Spanish. However he was soon defeated and taken prisoner himself.

The federalists now organized a new offensive against Cundinamarca, this time with the aid of Venezuelan Colonel Simón Bolívar. Álvarez refused to submit to the United Provinces or to make a deal with the Tunja opposition or with Bolívar. Bolívar attacked the city, which fell on December 11, 1814. Álvarez turned over power, asking only for guarantees of safety for Spanish and Criollo supporters of the regency. Thereafter he retired to private life.

== Arrest and execution ==
On May 26, 1816, the Spanish under Pablo Morillo reconquered the city of Bogotá, and Morillo set up a tribunal to judge the Criollos who had participated in the insurrection. Álvarez and other members of his extended family were arrested, tried, and sentenced to death. Álvarez's sentence was carried out on September 10, 1816, in Parque de Santander in Bogotá.

== Sources ==
- (in Spanish) Abella, Arturo, El florero de Llorente. Bogotá, Antares, 1960.
- (in Spanish) Ibañez, Pedro María, "Manuel Bernardo Alvarez", in Boletín de Historia y Antigüedades (Aug. 1903).
- (in Spanish) Mendoza Véles, Jorge, Gobernantes de La Nueva Granada. Síntesis biográficas. Bogotá, Minerva, 1951.
- (in Spanish) Otero Muñoz, Gustavo, Hombres y ciudades. Bogotá, Ministerio de Educación, 1948.
- (in Spanish) Riva, Raimundo, "Manuel Bernardo Alvarez", in Boletín de Historia y Antigüedades (Aug.-Sept. 1916).
- Uribe-Uran, V. M. (2000). Honorable Lives: Lawyers, Family, and Politics in Colombia, 1780–1850. United States: University of Pittsburgh Press.
