= John Arlington González =

Colombian footballer (born 1989)

Personal information
- Full name: John Arlinton González
- Date of birth: February 2, 1989 (age 37)
- Place of birth: Caloto, Colombia
- Position: Midfielder

Team information
- Current team: Millonarios
- Number: 24

Youth career
- Millonarios

Senior career*
Years	Team	Apps	(Gls)
2007–2009	Millonarios	2	(0)
- * Club domestic league appearances and goals as of 27 March 2008

John Arlinton González (born February 2, 1989) is a Colombian football midfielder, who played for Millonarios in the Copa Mustang.
