= New Granada Civil War =

Civil war from 1812 to 1814 in New Granada (now Colombia)

- Part of Colombian War of Independence
- Map of New Granada in 1811 with the Federalist territory in red, the Centralist in green and the Royalist (Spanish) in yellow.
Date	December 1812 – January 1813; December 1814
Location	New Granada (present-day Colombia)
Result	Federalist victory
Territorial changes	Definitive incorporation of Cundinamarca into the United Provinces in 1814.

Belligerents
Federalists	Centralists

Commanders and leaders
Camilo Torres; Antonio Baraya; Atanasio Girardot; Simón Bolívar	Antonio Nariño; Bernardo Álvarez; José de Leyva

Strength
3,000-5,000	3,000 (1812); 2,500 (1814)

Casualties and losses
800 dead and 1000 prisoners until 1813 204 dead and 100 wounded (1814)	600 dead approx. until 1813 All dead, captured or demobilized (1814)

The New Granada Civil War was a civil war between 1812 and 1814 in New Granada (present-day Colombia) between Federalists and Centralists. The war ended with a victory for the Federalists.

== Context ==
After the Supreme Central Junta in Spain had been dissolved in 1810, two political entities were formed in present-day Colombia which declared themselves independent from Spain.

The first was the Free and Independent State of Cundinamarca, centered around the former capital Santa Fé de Bogotá and led by Jorge Tadeo Lozano and Antonio Nariño. They followed a Centralist policy, and were convinced that the economic and political power of Cundinamarca would allow it to dominate and unify New Granada.
The second was the United Provinces of New Granada, led by Camilo Torres Tenorio, which had been created as a looser Federation of Provinces.

The animosity between Nariño's centralist factions and the federalist factions in the Congress, led by Torres, soon spread to the respective regions. The Free and Independent State of Cundinamarca and the United Provinces of New Granada (the Congress now located in the province of Tunja) engaged in constant conflict, and soon became embroiled in Civil War.

== First Civil War (December 1812-January 1813) ==
Nariño ordered General Antonio Baraya to attack the Federalist leaders in Tunja, but Baraya decided to switch sides and support the Federalist forces. Many important leaders like Francisco de Paula Santander and Francisco José de Caldas joined him. Baraya and the rebels with him, signed an act that declared Nariño an usurper and a tyrant, and pledged loyalty to the Congress. Nariño used the opportunity to request extraordinary powers from the legislature of Cundinamarca, which allowed him to be appointed as a dictator.

On 26 November 1812, Nariño left with his army to conquer Tunja. On 2 December 1812, his army faced a Federalist army commanded by Antonio Ricaurte and Atanasio Girardot in the Battle of Ventaquemada (es), and was soundly defeated, having to retreat back to Santafé de Bogota.
The Federalist troops, however, only started pursuing more than a week later, giving Nariño's troops enough time to organise a defense. Baraya's troops lay siege to Santafé de Bogota on 24 December. But on 9 January 1813, in the Battle of San Victorino (es), Nariño's troops proved superior and the Federalist troops were completely defeated.
With this victory for Cundinamarca, the War ended momentarily, after the two sides agreed to join forces against the common enemy: the Royalist armies.

== Nariño's Expedition to the South and Bolívar's attack (December 1814) ==
Nariño took advantage of the truce, to launch his Southern Campaign against the Royalists who controlled the provinces of Pasto and Popayán. After some victories, his army is decisively defeated in the Battle of Ejidos de Pasto (es), and he is taken prisoner in May 1814 by the Spanish governor of Quito Melchor Aymerich, and locked up in Spain.

The failure of the campaign and the capture of Nariño left Cundinamarca significantly weakened. The United Provinces took the opportunity to send an army against it, headed by Simón Bolívar, who had been expelled from Venezuela in August 1814 after the fall of the Second Republic of Venezuela. On 10 December, Bolívar and his army of 5,000 men lay siege to Santafé de Bogotá (es), which was defended by only 2,000 men under command of Manuel de Bernardo Álvarez del Casal and José Ramón de Leyva.

Álvarez refused to submit to the United Provinces or to make a deal with Bolívar. Bolívar and his army stormed the city, which fell on 12 December 1814, after two days of bloody house-to-house combat. The government of Cundinamarca recognized the supremacy of the United Provinces of New Granada, handed over all its weapons and material to Bolivar, and in return the lives and property of the city's inhabitants would be respected.

Nevertheless, Bolivar's army had suffered heavy casualties (204 killed and 100 wounded), which led the Federalist troops to loot the city in revenge, killing Spanish civilians and raping women. A large part of the city was devastated.

Cundinamarca was integrated in the United Provinces of New Granada and José Miguel Pey de Andrade was named Governor of the province of Cundinamarca on 20 December 1814.
