= Nariño's Southern Campaign =

Part of the Colombian War of Independence

Nariño Southern Campaign
- Part of the Colombian War of Independence
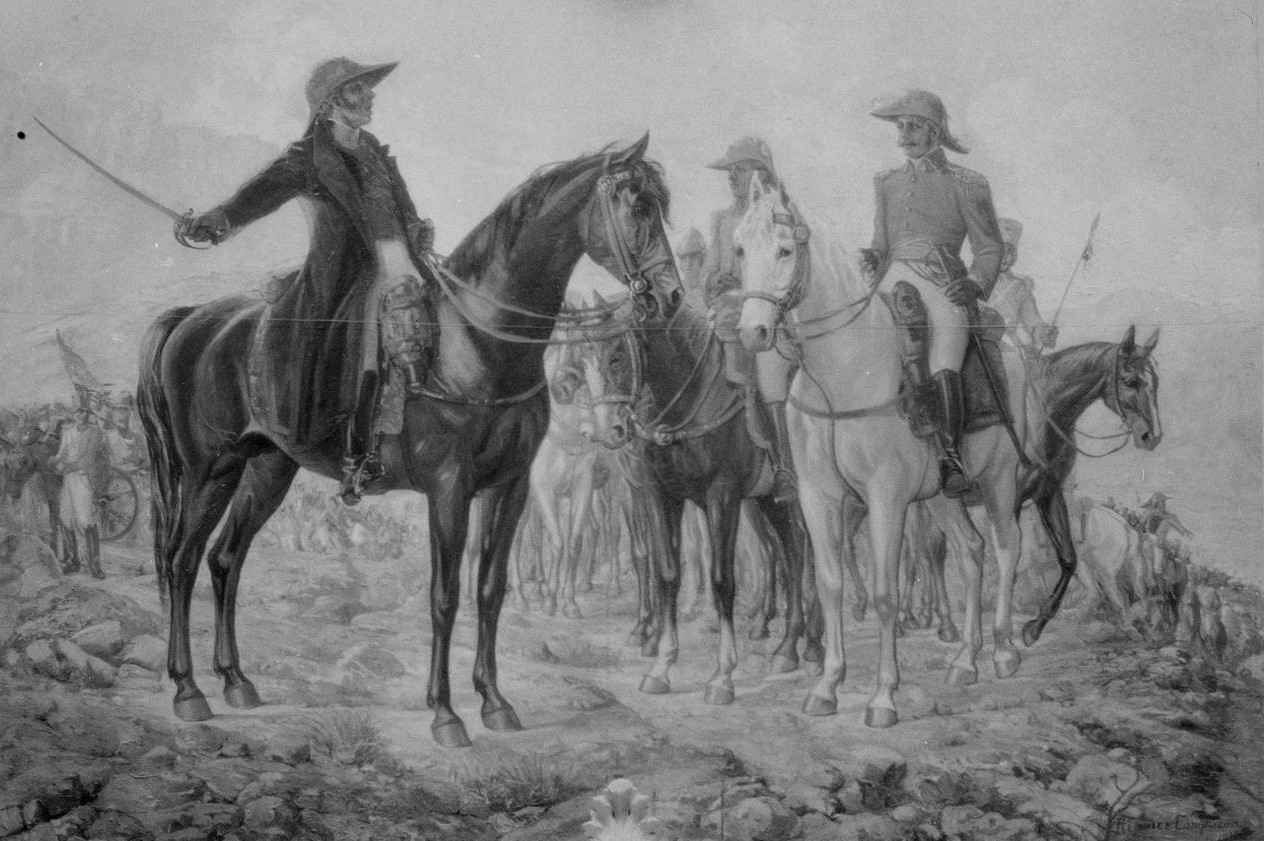
- Nariño in the Southern Campaign by Ricardo Jiménez Campuzano
Date	30 December 1813 – 10 May 1814
Location	Popayán Province, New Granada
Result	Royalist victory: Initial republican victories at Alto Palacé, Calibío, Juanambú and Tacines; Republican advance toward Pasto; Republican defeat at the Battle of Ejidos de Pasto; Capture of Antonio Nariño
Territorial changes	Royalist control of Pasto maintained; Popayán contested

Belligerents
State of Cundinamarca; United Provinces of New Granada	Kingdom of Spain

Commanders and leaders
Antonio Nariño (Commander-in-chief; POW); José Ramón de Leyva (Chief of Staff); José María Cabal (Vanguard commander); José Ignacio Rodríguez (Column commander); Antonio Nariño Ortega (Cavalry commander); José María Vergara y Lozano (Battalion commander) Pedro Monsalve (Socorro Battalion)	(Spain) Toribio Montes (Captain General of Quito) (Spain) Juan de Sámano (Royalist commander, 1813–1814) (Spain) Melchor Aymerich (Royalist commander, 1814) (Spain) Ignacio Asín (Colonel; KIA at Calibío) (Spain) Juan María de la Villota (Royalist officer; KIA)

Units involved
Army of the South; Cundinamarca infantry; Granaderos de Cundinamarca; Republican cavalry; Provincial contingents of New Granada	Royalist Army of Quito; Royalist troops of Popayán; Royalist militias of Pasto; Royalist guerrillas of Patía

Strength
1,200 infantry, 200 cavalry at the start, 2,000 men at the start 1,500 infantry, 500 cavalry, abundant artillery, 600 men, 15 pieces of artillery at the end	1,200–2,500 at the start 1,500 men and 10 pieces of artillery at the end

Casualties and losses
1,000+	500–1,000

The Nariño Southern Campaign was a series of military actions between December 1813 and May 1814, under command of Antonio Nariño, leader of the Republican State of Cundinamarca, against Spanish forces in the south of New Granada.
It had the objective of dislodging the Royalist presence in the south after the defeat of the first independence movement in the province of Quito (1812), a fact that put the New Granada provinces, that had retained their early independence, at risk. Nariño's army took the city of Popayán (December 1813) and the surroundings of Pasto (May 1814), but was decisively defeated in the Battle of Ejidos de Pasto (10 May 1814), ending the campaign in total failure.

== Start of the campaign ==
After Nariño's triumph in New Granada Civil War in January 1813, hostilities were suspended between the Cundinamarca and the United Provinces of New Granada and it was agreed to confront the Royalist attacks coming from Venezuela to the north, and province of Quito to the south.

Thus, in March 1813, the centralist leader of Cundinamarca, Antonio Nariño, and the federalist Congress of the United Provinces of New Granada decided to assist the Venezuelan troops commanded by Simón Bolívar and José Félix Ribas, who would undertake the so-called Admirable Campaign against Venezuela.

=== Royalist Invasion of southern New Granada ===
Meanwhile in southern New Granada, the Spanish governor and captain-general of the Quito province, Toribio Montes, after having defeated the local patriots, reestablished Spanish control over the province. With control consolidated he then decided to launch an offensive against the neogranadine patriots. He made Colonel Juan de Sámano as commander of the royalist army to lead the offensive, using Pasto as his base of operations, as well being supported by the militias of Pasto and Patia. This grouping of forces, marched north and captured the city of Popayán on July 1, without encountering resistance. He continued his invasion into the Cauca Valley and by the 18th he was in Cali and on August 5 he reached Cartago where he defeated a small column of patriots under the command of Lt. Colonel Manuel de Serviez. From there he halted his offensive, and withdrew south back to Popayán. This ended up being a mistake as: "if he had only deployed a column of 400 men to march north, he would have taken over the rich province of Antioquia without firing a shot, but, given the weakness of the patriots in the region, he considered the campaign over.

These events alerted Nariño, who marched south on 21 September, leaving his uncle Manuel de Bernardo Álvarez, as interim president of Cundinamarca in Santafé. Nariño's army was composed of units from both Cundinamarca and the United Provinces, the battalions that marched south were the Grenadiers of Cundinamarca, National Guards, Patriotas, Tunja, and Socorro.

Nariño's army crossed the central mountain range through the Guanacas moorland, then passing in Neiva and crossing the Magdalena River, were they camped in the city of La Plata before launching their offensive Popayán. Whilst there Nariño raised another battalion named Cazadores. Towards December Nariño launched his offensive on Popayán.

== Battles of Alto Palacé and Calibío ==
On 30 December 1813, having crossed the moorland, a force of 300 men commanded by Colonel José María Cabal, defeated 700 Royalists in the Battle of Alto Palacé, forcing Juan de Sámano to retreat to Popayán, and abandon that city shortly after, destroying the artillery that was located there. This retreat allowed the occupation of the city by Nariño's troops the next day.

Sámano regrouped at the Calibío hacienda where he was reinforced with troops commanded by Colonel Ignacio Asín, an officer known for his successive triumphs over the independentists in the region. In Calibío, they clashed with the army of Nariño on 15 January 1814, in a bloody battle that would last for more than three hours and that would be decided in favor of the Patriots. In this action, the Cundinamarca troops conquered many weapons and Asín was killed in combat.

Sámano fled with the remains of his army to Pasto, where he was relieved of command by order of the governor of Quito Toribio Montes and replaced by Lieutenant General Melchor Aymerich. After the Battle of Calibío, the Royalists had not been pursued by the Patriots, due to the difficulties of the terrain, the lack of reinforcements, the permanent attacks by guerrilleros in the region and the presence of Royalist spies in the city who could report on their movements. Due to this, it was only on 22 March that the Patriot troops left for Pasto.

== Battles of Juanambú, Cebollas, Tacines and Ejidos de Pasto ==
After a painful march through rough terrain and harassed by guerrilleros, Nariño's troops arrived at the Juanambú River on 12 April. There they were met by the Royalist army, and only after two weeks of fighting, finally were able to open the road to Pasto on 28 April. The march towards the south continued amid increasingly violent fighting, until Aymerich was defeated again at the Battle of Tacines, on 9 May 1814.

With the road clear to Pasto, the divisions commanded by Nariño marched to the city on 10 May, encountering the Royalist army in the city's outskirts (ejidos), mostly composed of armed inhabitants of Pasto. However, Nariño was ambushed, wounded and abandoned by his rear guard who believe him dead. This triggered a decisive attack on his remaining troops and resulted in a total victory for the Royalists. Upon retreating, Nariño found that the bulk of the army had fled towards Popayán, so he decided days later to surrender to the Spanish authorities in Pasto.

After the defeat, Nariño would remain a prisoner for a year in the city and then would be transferred to the Cádiz prison in Spain and would only return to the country in 1821. this campaign had seriously weakened the Republicans and would lead to the disappearance of Cundinamarca in December 1814.

== Links ==
- Museo de la Independencia
