= Caloto, Cauca =

Coordinates: 3°02′N 76°25′W

- Municipality and town
- Flag Coat of arms

- Location of the municipality and town of Caloto, Cauca in the Cauca Department of Colombia.
- Country: Colombia
- Department: Cauca Department

Area
  - Total: 426 km^{2} (164 sq mi)

Population (Census 2018)
  - Total: 25,416
  - Density: 59.7/km^{2} (155/sq mi)
- Time zone: UTC-5 (Colombia Standard Time)
- Climate: Am

Caloto is a town and municipality in the Cauca Department, Colombia. It was founded on June 29, 1543 by Sebastián de Belalcázar.

== Notable people ==
- Davinson Sánchez, footballer
- John Arlington González, footballer
