= Free and Independent State of Cundinamarca =

1810–1815 rebel state in colonial Colombia

Coordinates: 4°35′N 74°4′W

Free and Independent State of Cundinamarca Estado Libre e Independiente de Cundinamarca (Spanish)
- 1811–1816
- Flag Coat of arms

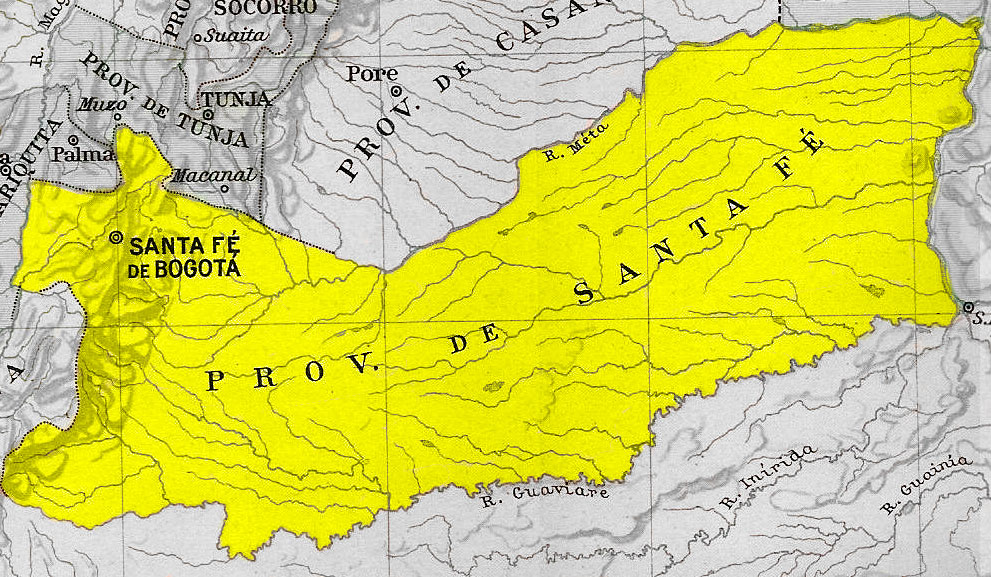
- Capital: Bogotá
- Common languages: Spanish
- Religion: Roman Catholicism (official)
- President
  - 1811: Jorge Tadeo Lozano
  - 1811–1814: Antonio Nariño
  - 1814: Manuel de Bernardo Álvarez
- History
  - Established: 1811
  - Bolivar takes Santafé: 1816
| Preceded by | Succeeded by |
| New Kingdom of Granada; Province of Bogotá | United Provinces of New Granada; Province of Bogotá |
- Today part of: Colombia

The Free and Independent State of Cundinamarca (Spanish: Estado Libre e Independiente de Cundinamarca) was a rebel state in colonial Colombia. It included parts of the former New Kingdom of Granada (part of the Viceroyalty of New Granada). The state originated as a result of the Foolish Fatherland (Patria Boba) period at the beginning of the Spanish American wars of independence. Its capital was Bogotá, the former capital of the Viceroyalty of New Granada.

== History ==
Following the occupation of Spain during the Napoleonic Wars, Cundinamarca was one of the states (such as United Provinces of South America (current Argentina) and the First Republic of Venezuela) who replaced its viceregal government with a local junta in the name of the deposed Ferdinand VII. Following the creation of juntas all over New Granada, the provinces started establishing their own autonomous governments. Unable to unify them into a single state, the Junta Suprema in Santafé (the former vice-royal capital and the center of the Province of Cundinamarca), which had been installed on July 20, 1810, called for constitutional assembly for the province. In March 1811, the province convened a "Constituent Electoral College of the State of Cundinamarca," which promulgated a constitution the following month declaring the creation of the Free and Independent State of Cundinamarca, with Jorge Tadeo Lozano as its first president. The constitution followed the model of the Constitution of the United States, and established Cundinamarca as a Catholic and constitutional monarchy, under the absent Ferdinand VII (it would only declare full independence from Spain in August 1813).

Antonio Nariño, who had been appointed as Mayor of the city of Santafé on August 30, 1811, started pushing for a strong centralist position from the newspaper he created, La Bagatela (or The Triffle). Nariño became a ruthless critic of Lozano, whom he accused of indecisiveness. The aggressive criticisms by Nariño and his followers led to a riot in the city on September 19, 1811, following which president Lozano and his vice president were forced to resign. Fearful of popular rioting, the legislature elected Nariño as president and conceded to his demands that increased the influence of the executive power.

The conflict between centralist and federalist ideas that characterized the following years is called the Foolish Fatherland. While Cundinamarca, including the old capital and administrative machinery, advocated the establishment of a strong centralist government, other parts of the old viceroyalty banded together as the United Provinces of New Granada to support a federal structure. Unable to unify the country in a centralist state, and fearing the loss of power that would come as a consequence of federalism, Cundinamarca under Nariño became embroiled in Civil War against other provinces, particularly Tunja, where the Federalist Congress had settled. On November 26, 1812, Nariño left with his army to conquer Tunja. On December 2, 1812, his army faced a federalist army commanded by Antonio Ricaurte and Atanasio Girardot in the Battle of Ventaquemada, and was soundly defeated, having to retreat back to Bogotá. The federalist troops, however, only started pursuing more than a week later.

Following the defeat, and the subsequent declaration of independence from the Province of Socorro, Nariño resigned as soon as he arrived to the city, but not finding a suitable replacement, he was reinstalled as dictator. Nariño prepared to defend the city, which was sieged on December 24. Nevertheless, on January 9, 1813, in the Battle of San Victorino, Nariño's troops proved superior and the federalist armies were completely defeated. In June 1813, he was appointed dictator for life, and the following month, the Republic of Cundinamarca finally declared independence from the Monarchy.

In July 1813, and motivated by his victory over the federalists, General Nariño began an intensive military campaign against the remaining Spanish and Royalist forces in the south, intending to reach Pasto and eventually Quito. Nariño's forces, known as the Army of the South, numbering 1,500 to 2,000 men, managed to capture Popayán in January 1814, but were utterly defeated in Pasto in May 1814, and Nariño was arrested and then sent to the Royal prison at Cádiz via Quito. The federalists took advantage of this to attack Bogotá, which allowed General Simón Bolívar of the United Provinces to force terms in December 1814. By mid-1815, however, Pablo Morillo arrived with a large Spanish force and returned the region to submission to the since-restored Ferdinand. Morillo's campaign culminated with the capture of Santafé on May 6, 1816.

== List of presidents ==
Free and Independent State of Cundinamarca
| No. | Presidents | Term | |
|---|---|---|---|
| 1 | Jorge Tadeo Lozano | 24 March 1811 | 19 September 1811 |
| 2 | Antonio Nariño y Álvarez | 20 September 1811 | 10 May 1814 |
| 2 | Luis de Ayala y Vergara (acting) | 25 June 1812 | 5 August 1812 |
| 2 | Manuel Benito de Castro Arcaya (acting) | 19 August 1812 | 12 September 1812 |
| 2 | Felipe de Vergara Azcárate y Caycedo (acting) | 26 November 1812 | 14 December 1812 |
| 2 | Manuel de Bernardo Álvarez (acting) | 13 August 1813 | 10 May 1814 |
| 3 | Manuel de Bernardo Álvarez | 10 May 1814 | 12 December 1814 |
Annexed by the United Provinces of New Granada

== See also ==
- Spanish reconquest of New Granada
- United Provinces of New Granada
