= Juan de Sámano =

Spanish military officer and viceroy of New Granada

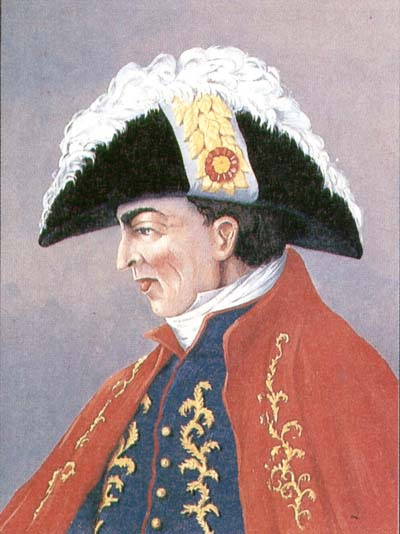

17th Viceroy of New Granada
- In office March 9th, 1818 – August 9, 1819
- Monarch: Ferdinand VII
- Preceded by: Francisco José Montalvo y Ambulodi
- Succeeded by: Viceroyalty abolished

Personal details
- Born: August 30, 1753 Selaya, Cantabria, Kingdom of Spain
- Died: 1 August 1821 (aged 67) Panama, Viceroyalty of New Granada

Military service
- Allegiance: Kingdom of Spain
- Branch/service: Spanish Army
- Years of service: 1771-1821
- Rank: Field Marshal
- Commands: III Division of the Expeditionary Army of Costa Firme
- Battles/wars: Colombian War of Independence; Nariño's Southern Campaign; Spanish reconquest of New Granada

Juan José Francisco de Sámano y Uribarri de Rebollar y Mazorra (1753 in Selaya, Cantabria – July 1821 in Panama), was a Spanish military officer and the last viceroy of New Granada from March 9, 1818, to August 9, 1819, during the Colombian War of Independence.

== Military career ==
Sámano was a member of a distinguished family with a long tradition in the militia. In 1771 he entered the military as a cadet, and by 1779 he was a lieutenant. He was also a professor of mathematics at the Military Academy of Barcelona, where he remained for five years.

In 1780 he moved to the Indies — first to Puerto Rico, later to Cuba, and finally to Cartagena de Indias (in modern Colombia). In 1785 he returned to Europe. In 1789 he was promoted to captain and fought in the war with revolutionary France, under the command of General Ventura Caro. In one battle he was wounded in both thighs.

In 1794 he was transferred back to New Granada, at his request. He became governor of Riohacha in 1806, where he repelled a British attack.

=== Spanish-American wars of Independence ===
In 1809 a revolt occurred in the city of Quito against the Spanish officials of the city. In an effort to reinforce the garrison in Bogotá which had sent men to put down the rebellion in Quito Sámano departed from Riohacha and went to Bogotá, accompanied by 30 cavalry troops arriving there on October 20. There he volunteered for the service of Viceroy Antonio José Amar y Borbón to fight against the insurgents.

By January 1, 1810, with the rank of colonel, Sámano was in command of the Auxiliary Battalion of Santa Fe de Bogotá, the main military force tasked with protecting the viceregal capital. Seven months later the Revolt of July 20, 1810 occurred where the creoles of Santa Fe revolted against the Viceroy and clamored for the establishment of a junta. Sámano had planned to put down the revolt and was awaiting the order to be given by the Viceroy, however his second in command Sergeant Major José María Moledo, who together with other officers such as Lieutenant Antonio Baraya not only sympathized with the revolution, but took an active part in it. That night Sámano remained in his quarters, guarded by Moledo and Baraya, who had sworn allegiance to the rebel junta in Bogotá. In the early morning of July 21, Colonel Sámano took an oath before the president of the Junta, José Miguel Pey. Pey ordered that he be relieved of his command of the Auxiliary Battalion. As a result, Moledo was promoted to Lieutenant Colonel by the Junta named to replace him.

Sámano was issued a passport so that he could leave New Granada. He returned to Spain, where he was commissioned to pacify the region of Quito and Guayaquil.

=== Offensive in New Granada ===
With the revolution crushed in the Quito province, Governor Toribio Montes decided to launch an offensive against the patriots of New Granada who since 1810 controlled large swaths of the old viceroyalty. To do this, he named Colonel Sámano as commander of the royalist army tasked with the offensive, using the royalist controlled city of Pasto as his base of operations, he gathered around 2,000 troops made up regulars from the Lima Division along with a sizable portion of militia battalions from Pasto and Patia, he also had a cavalry squadron and artillery.

This grouping of forces, marched north with objective of capturing the provincial capital of Popayán during the first days of June. They soon reached the town of Mercaderes from where Sámano sent an ultimatum to the republican government of the city demanding their surrender. The government convened an emergency general council meeting to discuss their options. There were only 300 troops available under the command of Lt. Colonel Ignacio Rodriguez, which complicated any hopes for a successful defense of the city. The junta decided to capitulate, however prior to this Colonel Rodriguez took his garrison force and withdrew north to Cauca valley while some government officials fled east to La Plata which lay across the Andes. Sámano and his forces entered the city on July 1, without encountering resistance, there he proclaimed the authority of the Spanish Constitution of 1812, and also received a promotion to brigadier.

Sámano continued his invasion in pursuit of Rodriguez's forces, marching north into the Cauca Valley. By July 18 he captured the city of Cali, by this point Rodriguez had dissolved his force allowing his troops to take which ever path they wanted, however a size-able portion still remained united under Colonel Ignacio Torres. On August 5, he reached the city Cartago where he encountered a small column of 150 patriot troops under the command of French officer Lt. Colonel Manuel de Serviez. Sámano attacked them and in short order forced them to retreat, capturing their weapons and some prisoners. From there he halted his offensive, and withdrew south back to Popayán. This decision ended up being a tactical blunder by Sámano as: "if he had only deployed a column of 400 men to march north, he would have taken over the rich province of Antioquia without firing a shot, but, given the weakness of the patriots in the region, he considered the campaign over."

=== Nariño's Southern Campaign ===
Sámano's invasion of southern New Granada caused panic of amongst the republican government of the United Provinces of New Granada and the Free State of Cundinamarca who joined to raise an army to counter this invasion.

The president of Cundinamarca, Antonio Nariño offered to command the army to drive the royalists out of the south as well as liberate Quito. Nariño was accepted by both Cundinamarca and the United Provinces who made him a lieutenant general and commander of the army of the Union with around 2,000 troops including infantry, cavalry, and artillery at his helm. Nariño marched south to launch his campaign in August 1813.

Nariño's plan consisted of crossing the Andes through the Guanacas pass and approaching Popayán from the east, while at the same time Colonel Rodriguez would march from Ibague along with Colonel Guiterrez's troops marching down south from Antioquia and invade the Cauca Valley and approach Popayán from the north. On December 20, 1813, Nariño at the head of his 2,000 strong army began their crossing of the Andes, with Rodriguez and Guitierrez also starting their march as well. Samano soon received information of his enemy's movements and decided to split his army in two sending 1,000 men north to the town of Quilichao under the command of his second-in-command Lt. Colonel Ignacio Asín to defend Popayán from the north while he would block Nariño from the east at the strategic bridge over the Palacé river with 600 troops.

There Sámano placed his troops in three areas, one on the heights observing the bridge in battle formation with infantry and cavalry along with two artillery pieces, another group of troops were placed on the bridge itself, and a third group placed in the forest around the main road. On December 30, Nariño spotted the royalists in the heights above the bridge and ordered Colonel José María Cabal to take the vanguard of the army (some 300 troops) and force their way across the bridge. This would mark the beginning of the Battle of Alto Palacé. Cabal and his troops descended from the mountain towards the bridge where they were fired upon by the royalists, despite the heavy fire from the hidden royalist units, Cabal persisted and continued on with the attack and his troops were able to force their way across the bridge over Palacé River. The patriots troops were also able to prevent the royalists from blowing up the bridge after they had cleared of it of enemy troops, sustaining few casualties in the process

The defeat at Alto Palacé forced Sámano to retreat to the town of El Tambo, just west of Popayán. The victory allowed the Patriots to capture the city, however Nariño was worried about the possibility of Asin's forces joining up with Samano's to conduct a counterattack. After entering the city and finding it clear of troops, Nariño left the city and placed his camp near at the Bajo Palacé field which lay north of the city along the main road that led from the Cauca Valley to the city. There he remained for the next few days as he attempted to block Asin who was marching south from Quilichiao being pursued by Rodriguez's troops. Nariño then ordered Cabal to conduct reconnaissance on Samano's forces that had marched from El Tambo and made camp at the Calibio Hacienda. Despite the patriot's efforts on the night of January 8, 1814, Asin managed to arrive at the Calibio Hacienda using a series of alternatives roads to avoid the patriots. Cabal who was near the area conducting reconnaissance on his foe informed Nariño of this and requested permission to attack confident of its success, this request was denied and Nariño ordered Cabal to withdraw to the main patriot camp as he wished to present battle with Samano at full strength as Colonel Rodriguez's troops marching down south had still not arrived.

==== Battle of Calibío ====
On January 13, Rodriguez and his troops finally arrived, Nariño was now ready to do battle with Samano at the Calibio Hacienda which lay some 8 km from his camp at Bajo Palacé. The patriot army had at its disposal some 2,000 troops with ample artillery, while Samano had a similar number of troops at his disposal with ample artillery as well. At 6 am on January 15, Nariño gave the order to march towards the hacienda, the march took some 4 hours to complete.

After the patriots arrived to the hacienda they quickly took to battle formation forming into three columns; the left column was made up of the Socorro battalion under the command of Sergeant Major Pedro Monsalve along with the troops of Colonel Rodríguez, the center column was where the bulk of the army was located along with the artillery which was under the command of Nariño and Brigadier Leyva. Colonel Cabal commanded the right column which was placed in a small depression where it could not be seen by the enemy, and waited there for the right opportunity to launch an attack.

The battle began with both sides exchanging heavy volley and artillery fire all along the middle, half an hour after the battle had begun, Cabal received the order from Nariño to advance on the enemy's left. Cabal's column advanced and appeared before their enemy at a distance of less than rifle shot from the royalist left flank, at that very moment Cabal ordered his column to charge with bayonets. Cabal's attack surprised Sámano who did not expect to be attacked on his left, and who frantically deployed a detachment of 50 troops and an artillery piece to stop the attack. This attack combined with the attack by the Cundinamarca Grenadiers battalion from the center column managed to break the royalist lines and capture their artillery, opening a gap which the patriot cavalry took advantage of and attacked the royalist center. The bloody three-hour-long battle ended in a complete defeat for the royalists who lost 400 dead and wounded as well as the loss of almost all of their weapons and the capture of 300 men, then they undertook a disastrous retreat to Pasto. After the victory, the patriot army marched triumphantly into Popayán.

When news reached Quito of the disaster at Calibío, Montes was infuriated and revoked Sámano's command and replaced him with Field Marshal Melchor Aymerich. Apart from losing his command Montes also ordered him to travel at Quito at once where he faced a military tribunal for his defeat of the army.

He returned to Quito, where he faced this military tribunal for the next two years. In 1816 he was acquitted and Montes gave him the command of another expedition to invade New Granada. His command in Pasto was restored, and on June 29, 1816, he won a decisive victory at the Battle of Cuchilla del Tambo over the rebel Liborio Mejía. Two hundred fifty were killed, and the Royalists took 300 prisoners and all of the rebels' arms and equipment.

On July 1, 1816, Sámano's troops again occupied Popayán. Among the patriots taken prisoner was José Hilario López, who unexpectedly escaped execution and later became president of New Granada (1849–53). Sámano ordered the execution of rebel leader Carlos Montúfar.

After promoting him to field marshal, Morillo gave Sámano command of Bogotá as commanding general of New Granada. He arrived in Bogotá on October 23, 1816, where he began a program of repression without the approval of Viceroy Francisco Montalvo y Ambulodi. He founded three tribunals: the Permanent Council of War, empowered to issue death sentences against the rebels; the Council of Purification, authorized to judge rebels not meriting the death penalty; and the Junta of Confiscation, intended to seize the possessions of others compromised in the rebellion.

Among the rebels executed were Camilo Torres, Francisco José de Caldas, Joaquín Camacho, Frutos Joaquín Gutiérrez, Antonio Villavicencio, Antonio Baraya, Liborio Mejía, Jorge Tadeo Lozano, Policarpa Salavarrieta, Alejo Sabaraín, and María Antonia Santos Plata.

== As viceroy ==
In August 1817 Sámano was named viceroy, governor and captain general of the reborn Viceroyalty of New Granada, and president of the Audiencia of Bogotá. By royal decree he was granted the Grand Cross of the Order of San Hermenegildo, for his services to the Crown. He took formal possession of his new offices on March 9, 1818. He founded the Academy of Medicine in Bogotá. However, the Audiencia formally complained of his administration to Madrid.

On August 9, 1819, news of the defeat of José Barreiro’s forces in the Battle of Boyacá arrived in the capital. Sámano quickly fled to Cartagena de Indias, where they refused to recognize his authority. (He was unpopular there because of his reputation for repression.)

He sailed for Jamaica, but soon returned to Panama. He remained there without administrative or military control until his resignation. In August 1819, old and sick, he resigned as viceroy. He remained in Panama until his death in July 1821, awaiting permission to return to Spain.

Government offices
Preceded by Francisco Montalvo y Ambulodi	Viceroy of New Granada; 1818–1819	Succeeded by Juan de la Cruz Mourgeón
