= Spanish reconquest of New Granada =

Part of the Colombian war of independence

- Part of the Colombian War of Independence and the Spanish American wars of independence
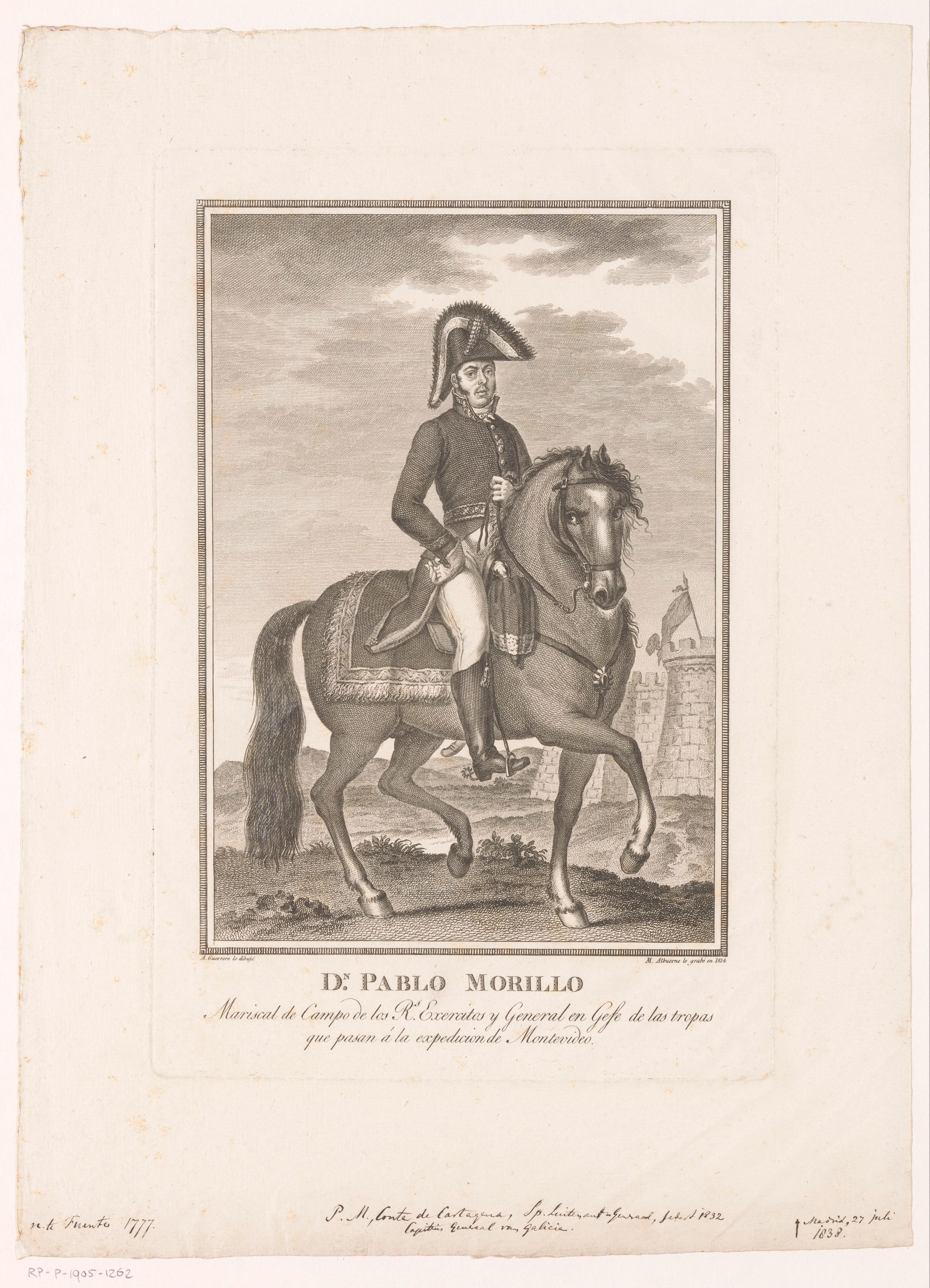
- Pablo Morillo, Commander-in-chief of the combined Spanish-Venezuelan expeditionary force.
Date	1815–1816
Location	United Provinces of New Granada
Result	Spanish royalist victory: Fall of Cartagena de Indias (6 December 1815); Royalist victory at the Battle of Cachirí (22 February 1816); Royalist occupation of Santafé de Bogotá (6 May 1816); Defeat of the remaining principal republican army at the Battle of Cuchilla del Tambo (29 June 1816); Restoration of the Viceroyalty of New Granada under Spanish royal authority; Collapse of the central government of the United Provinces of New Granada
Territorial changes	Restoration of Spanish royal authority over most of New Granada; republican forces retained positions in parts of the eastern plains

Belligerents
United Provinces of New Granada: Republican provincial armies; Republican militias; Republican forces from Venezuela	Kingdom of Spain and the Indies: Expeditionary Army of Costa Firme; Royalist forces of Venezuela; Royalist forces of Santa Marta Province; Royalist forces of Popayán Province; Royalist forces of Quito

Commanders and leaders
Political leadership Camilo Torres Tenorio (President); José Fernández Madrid (President); Liborio Mejía (President; captured); Military commanders Custodio García Rovira (Army of the North; captured); Manuel Roergas Serviez (Republican field commander); Manuel del Castillo y Rada (Cartagena; captured); José Francisco Bermúdez (Cartagena); Francisco de Paula Santander (Republican officer); Joaquín Ricaurte (Army of the East) Carlos Soublette (Republican officer)	Royal authority Ferdinand VII (King of Spain); High command Pablo Morillo (Commander-in-chief); Pascual Enrile (Naval commander); Field commanders Francisco Tomás Morales (Royalist field commander); Sebastián de la Calzada (Fifth Division); Juan de Sámano (Southern royalist forces); Miguel de la Torre (Royalist officer) Pedro Ruiz de Porras (Magdalena expedition)

Military formations
Republican forces: Army of the North; Army of the East; Republican garrison of Cartagena; Provincial infantry and cavalry; Republican artillery; Citizen militias; Republican naval and privateering vessels	Spanish expeditionary forces: Expeditionary Army of Costa Firme; Fifth Division; Spanish expeditionary infantry; Expeditionary cavalry and artillery; Spanish naval squadron; American royalist forces: Royalist infantry and cavalry from Venezuela; Royalist troops of Santa Marta; Royalist troops of Pasto and Popayán; Royalist provincial militias

Strength
5,975 soldiers and militiamen	4,200 Spanish troops 60 troopships

The Spanish reconquest of New Granada in 1815–1816 was part of the Spanish American wars of independence in South America and Colombian War of Independence. Shortly after the Napoleonic Wars ended, Ferdinand VII, recently restored to the throne in Spain, decided to send military forces to retake most of the northern South American colonies, which had established autonomous juntas and independent states. The Spanish expeditionary army under the command of Lieutenant General Pablo Morillo, with support from loyal colonial troops, completed the reconquest of New Granada by taking Bogotá on 6 May 1816.

== The expeditionary force and campaigns ==
In 1814, with King Ferdinand VII back on the Spanish throne, Spain decided to send to its most seditious colonies the strongest expeditionary force that it had ever sent to the Americas, this force was known as the Expeditionary army of Costa Firme (Spanish: Ejército Expedicionario de Costa Firme). Then Field Marshall Pablo Morillo later promoted to Lieutenant General, a veteran of the Spanish struggle against the French, was chosen as its commander with Admiral Pascual Enrile as second in command and commander of the naval forces. The expeditionary force was made up of approximately 10,000 men and nearly 60 ships. Originally, they were to head for Montevideo in the Viceroyalty of the Río de la Plata, but soon it was decided to send these forces to the Viceroyalty of New Granada (present-day Colombia, Ecuador, Panama) and the Captaincy General of Venezuela.

Leaving the port of Cádiz on 17 February 1815, the force initially landed at Carupano and the island of Margarita in April, where no resistance was encountered. After leaving the island, Morillo's troops reinforced existing royalist forces in the Venezuelan mainland, entering Cumaná and Caracas in May. A small part of the main corps set off towards Panama, while the main contingent was directed from Puerto Cabello towards the Neogranadine coastal city of Santa Marta which was still in Royalist hands. Half of the expedition remained in the defense of Venezuela. Only 4,200 expeditionary soldiers were sent to reconquer New Granada.

=== Arrival in New Granada – July 1815 ===
The expeditionary forces arrived on the Neogranadine coast on 23 July, arriving in Santa Marta, there Morillo's forces picked up supplies as well as militia volunteers. Morillo's main objective and main effort would be concentrarted on capturing the republican fortress city of Cartagena, which was the most important port in all of the colony.

Prior to setting out for Cartagena, Morillo ordered that Brigadier Pedro Ruiz de Porras take 1,000 troops composed of the battalions Fijo de Puerto Rico, Granada, and some elements of the Albuera battalion and a squadron of hussars. This advance force would penetrate the interior of the country and capture the important river port of Mompox which lay on the Magdalena River. Another royalist force would also support Morillo's invasion, that being 2,100 Venezuelan royalist troops of the V division under the command Colonel Sebastian de la Calzada who would invade from the east in Venezuela.

=== Siege of Cartagena ===
By mid August, Morillo and his forces set sail and arrived off Cartagena, the city was defended by some 4,000 troops under the command of General Manuel del Castillo y Rada amongst the troops were the Honor guard battalion, Militia units, as well as Venezuelan and foreign troops along with a contingent of dragoons and carabiners. There were also between 400 and 300 artillery troops to man the 400 artillery pieces that dotted the impressive fortifications that defended the city. For the next five months, the Spanish laid a brutal siege that devastated the civilian population however the defenders stubbornly held out.

By November however the siege began to take a toll on the Spanish and their expeditionary troops began to suffer from tropical diseases, as Morillo had lost his siege train equipment when the ship San Pedro blew up off the coast of Venezuela earlier that year, he began to order more offensive operations against the fortifications of the city. By early December, Morillo demanded the surrender the fortified city, at a council of war, the defenders of Cartagena decided not to capitulate, but to try to get out of the besieged city by sea and head towards Jamaica or Haiti. On the night of 5 December, the Cartagena authorities and some of the defenders set sail on ships, many of them corsairs, others merchant ships, under command of the French corsair Louis-Michel Aury. Of the nearly 2,000 people who left on 6 merchant ships and 10 armed schooners, only 600 people managed to reach Haiti. Many ships sank, ran aground or returned to port and were captured by the Spaniards. The fortified city finally fell on December 6, 1815.

=== Cachirí Campaign ===
While Cartagena was under siege, on 18 October 1815, Colonel Calzada's V division began their invasion of New Granada setting out from the town of Guasdualito, crossing the Arauca River and penetrated the eastern llanos of the Casanare Province of New Granada. The only republican army in the vicinity was the Army of the East under the command of Colonel Joaquín Ricaurte who had at his disposal 150 infantrymen and 1,000 cavalry. Ricaurte intercepted Calzada's forces on 31 October in an area called Chire. The republicans were victorious however Calzada's troops were able to escape destruction as Ricaurte's cavalry did not press their attack but instead focused on looting their defeated enemy. Despite escaping total destruction Calzada's forces had suffered 200 dead and around 300 captured and missing as a result of the battle, nevertheless he continued his invasion pivoting northward and crossed the Cordillera Oriental of the Andes through the Chita Pass into the Tunja Province with aims of marching towards Cúcuta.

- By early 1816, the combined efforts of Spanish and colonial forces, marching south from Cartagena and north from Royalist strongholds in Quito and Pasto completed the reconquest of New Granada. Colonel Sebastián de la Calzada won the Battle of Cachirí in February 1816 and took the Republican capital Bogotá on 6 May 1816. The Republican government fled to Popayán, but their last stronghold was also captured after their defeat in the Battle of Cuchilla del Tambo on 29 June 1816.

Captured units of the Republican armies of New Granada were incorporated into the Royalist army and sent to the Viceroyalty of Peru.

== Reign of Terror ==
A permanent consejo de guerra was set up to judge those accused of treason and rebellion, resulting in the execution of more than a hundred notable Republican officials, including:

Political leaders, presidents and statements

- Camilo Torres Tenorio, President of the United Provinces of New Granada; lawyer and author of the influential Memorial de Agravios (1809).
- Jorge Tadeo Lozano, First president of the State of Cundinamarca (1811); naturalist, journalist and early constitutional leader.
- Manuel de Bernardo Álvarez, President of Cundinamarca (1813–1814); lawyer and leading defender of the centralist republican government.
- Custodio García Rovira, President of the United Provinces of New Granada; lawyer, academic and military commander.
- Liborio Mejía, President of the United Provinces of New Granada in 1816; army officer and one of its youngest heads of state.
- Manuel Rodríguez Torices, President of the State of Cartagena; member of the federal executive triumvirate of the United Provinces.
- Antonio Villavicencio, Royal commissioner who supported the independence movement; subsequently a member of the United Provinces' governing triumvirate.
- Joaquín Camacho, Lawyer, journalist and republican statesman; member of the governing triumvirate of the United Provinces.
- José María García de Toledo, Lawyer and president of Cartagena's revolutionary governing junta; one of the Nine Martyrs of Cartagena.
- José Cayetano Vásquez, Republican political leader associated with the independence government of Tunja.
- Juan Nepomuceno Niño, Political leader and governor-president of the Province of Tunja during the independence period.

It is estimated that in total, some 7,000 people were executed by the Spanish between 1816 and 1819.

== Patriot reactions ==
On learning of the arrival of the expeditionary force, republican leaders assumed various positions. Internal divisions, which had developed during the previous years of struggle, softened but still remained a considerable obstacle. In the end, they prevented a coordinated effort by the different factions, although there were some attempts to do so, such as under the United Provinces of New Granada. One significant factor in the disunity was that representatives of the United Kingdom and of the United States refused to grant political recognition and would not commit the sufficient amount of economic and military aid to successfully resist Morillo's force. In addition, the provinces themselves did not give each other much-needed aid. Finally, several notable individuals, whose leadership would have been useful, decided to exile themselves, although other republican leaders remained in the region and tried to reorganize their military and political activities in order to face the new threat.

As a result of the internal conflicts in New Granada, Simón Bolívar, who had been acting under the authority of the United Provinces, left his command on 8 May 1815, after failing to subdue Cartagena in March in retaliation for its refusal to give him arms and men. Bolívar traveled to Jamaica and later Haiti, a small republic that had freed itself from French rule, where he and other independence leaders were given a friendly reception. Eventually, the growing exile community received money, volunteers and weapons from Haitian president Alexandre Pétion, and resumed the struggle for independence in the remote border areas of both New Granada and Venezuela, where they established irregular guerrilla bands with the locals. This formed the basis from which the struggle to establish republics successfully spread towards the other areas of South America under Spanish control.

== See also ==
- Patria Boba
- Reconquista (Spanish America)
- Bolívar's campaign to liberate New Granada
- History of Colombia

== Bibliography ==
- Jesús María y Arrubla Gerardo Henao, Historia de Colombia Para la Enseñanza Secundaria, Bogota, Voluntad, 1952, pp. 342–344
- Córdova : gloria y asesinato del héroe. Tomo I / Armando Barona Mesa; prólogo del académico Antonio Cacua Prada
- Costeloe, Michael P. Response to Revolution: Imperial Spain and the Spanish American Revolutions, 1810-1840. Cambridge: Cambridge University Press, 1986. ISBN 0-521-32083-6
- Earle, Rebecca. Spain and the Independence of Colombia, 1810-1825. Exter: University of Exter Press, 2000. ISBN 0-85989-612-9
- Stoan, Stephen K. Pablo Morillo and Venezuela, 1815-1820. Columbus: Ohio State University Press, 1959.
