= Custodio García Rovira =

Neogranadine general, statesman and painter

José Custodio Cayetano García Rovira
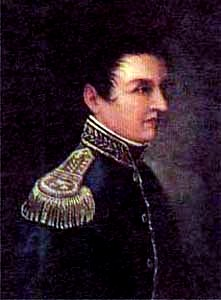

President of the United Provinces of the New Granada*
- In office January 21, 1815 – August 17, 1815
- Preceded by: Triumvirate; José María del Castillo y Rada, José Fernández Madrid, Joaquín Camacho
- Succeeded by: Antonio Villavicencio

President of the United Provinces of the New Granada
- In office June 30, 1816 – July 10, 1816
- Vice President: Liborio Mejía
- Preceded by: Liborio Mejía
- Succeeded by: Fernando Serrano

Personal details
- Born: March 2, 1780 Bucaramanga, Viceroyalty of New Granada
- Died: 8 August 1816 (aged 36) Sante Fe, Viceroyalty of New Granada
- Party: Federalist
- Spouse: María Josefa Piedrahita y Sáenz

Military service
- Allegiance: United Provinces of New Granada
- Branch/service: Army of the Union
- Rank: Brigadier General
- Commands: Army of the North
- Battles/wars: Battle of Cachirí
- Member President of the Triumvirate.

José Custodio Cayetano García Rovira (March 2, 1780 – August 8, 1816) was a Neogranadine general, statesman and painter, who fought for the independence of New Granada from Spain, and became President of the United Provinces of the New Granada in 1816. He was executed a month later during the Reconquista, at the hands of Pablo Morillo.

== Early life ==
José Custodio Cayetano García Rovira was born on March 2, 1780 in the then small town of Bucaramanga, in the province of Socorro, part of the Viceroyalty of the New Granada, in what is now Colombia. His father was Juan de Dios García Navas and his mother Rosa Rovira de García.

He was baptized one month later on April 2, 1780, in the parish of Señor San Laureano y Real de Minas de Chiquinquirá.

== Education ==
García Rovira completed his early studies in Bucaramanga, at the school of Felipe Munar, where he received his primary education. After finishing this stage, in 1795, García Rovira began efforts with the rector’s office of the Colegio Real y Seminario de San Bartolomé (Royal College and Seminary of San Bartolomé) to obtain a scholarship to continue his education.

After meeting all the requirements, García Rovira moved to the capital of the viceroyalty, Santafé de Bogotá, where on July 9, 1796, he appeared before the rector’s hall of San Bartolomé, presided over by Dr. Manuel Andrade, accompanied by his sponsor and teacher, Don Emigdio Benítez, to receive the red scholarship of the Bartolinos. That day, his noble background was approved, and he was admitted as a student at the College.

At the San Bartolomé, he completed his secondary studies, where he studied various subjects such as Latin, theology, philosophy, mathematics, literature, and canon, Roman, and Spanish law. His passion for languages became evident, and he learned Greek, French, and Italian. He also took an interest in the arts, learning poetry, painting, and music, often playing Haydn sonatas on the harpsichord.

In 1799 he graduated with a degree in Philosophy, and in 1804 he got his degree in Civil Law, and later a Doctorate in Theology. He also attended the Saint Thomas Aquinas University where he continued studying Painting and Music, later receiving a degree in Fine arts; on April 29, 1809, García also received his doctorate in Law and was officially received as a lawyer by the Real Audiencia de Santafé (Royal Audiency of Santafé de Bogotá). He later returned to San Bartolomé this time as a professor in the areas of Algebra, Mathematics, Trigonometry, Philosophy Metaphysics, and Ethics.

García's appetite for knowledge made him a celebrated figure in the Tertulias, and salons of the Bogotá. He formed part of the Tertulia Literaria del Buen Gusto, that was hosted in the house of doña Manuela Sanz de Santamaría de González Manrique, where other prominent figures like Francisco José de Caldas, José Fernández Madrid, Camilo Torres Tenorio, Alexander von Humboldt, Francisco Antonio Ulloa among others. He also attended the Tertulia Eutropélica, that congregated in the house of Manuel del Socorro Rodríguez and also the Tertulia of Antonio Nariño, where they studied the ideas and works of Montesquieu, Rousseau and Voltaire.

Because of his education, he was known as El Estudiante (The Student).

== Political and military life ==
After the Revolution of July 20, 1810, García started working for the newly formed government, on August he started working as a lawyer in the Appeals Tribunal of Bogotá. He was later appointed Lieutenant of the Army of Tunja, by its Governor Juan Nepomuceno Niño. He started getting involved in politics in Tunja since the Congress of the United Provinces was situated there.

== Governor of Socorro ==
In July 1812, the towns of the Province of Socorro were called to elections to choose a governor. Through their collective vote, Dr. Custodio García Rovira was elected as the province’s governor.

During the first months of his term, Governor García Rovira dedicated himself to supporting the Province of Tunja during the civil war of 1812. In October 1812, García Rovira informed Congress that he had already delivered the 4,000 pesos required from each province of the federation, along with an additional 8,000 pesos for the maintenance of the expedition that Socorro had stationed in the province of Tunja, despite the province’s depleted resources.

By December 1812, García Rovira, in his capacity as governor, marched at the head of the province’s militias, alongside the Lanceros del Socorro battalion integrated into the congress's Army of the Union, as part of the civil war that had erupted between the United Provinces and Cundinamarca. He was also part of the Congress’s political commission, which was tasked with negotiating the reorganization of the government of Cundinamarca in the event that the capture of Santafé was successful.

However, this plan never materialized, as the Army of the Union was defeated by the forces of Cundinamarca, led by its President Antonio Nariño, in the Battle of San Victorino, fought on January 9, 1813. As a result of the centralist victory, both sides agreed to end the conflict in order to focus on defending the emerging republic against the Spanish royalist threat. After the agreement was signed, Governor García Rovira returned to his province.

From this point onward, the government of Socorro under Custodio García Rovira dedicated itself to intense military preparation to support the defense of the country. This effort was evident through the dispatch of money, weapons, and clothing produced in the province, thanks to its thriving textile and leather industries.

In mid-1813, General Antonio Nariño announced a his plan to launch a military campaign aimed at liberating the southern part of the country, which had fallen into the hands of the royalists. Following the instructions of the Congress of the United Provinces, Governor García Rovira organized the Batallón de Infantería Cazadores del Socorro (Socorro Hunters Infantry Battalion) to join the expedition. This battalion consisted of 400 men under the command of Captain Pedro Monsalve.

Additionally, the governor provided the necessary logistical support, which included 22 loads of rice, 3,000 cartridges, 2,000 bullets, and 8,000 pesos to cover the unit’s expenses. These troops departed from the province at the end of July, arriving in Santafé at the beginning of August before setting out for the south later that month.

=== Northern Campaign ===
In October 1813, the Province of Socorro was threatened by the royalists following the defeat of Major Sergeant Francisco de Paula Santander and his patriot troops in the Battle of the Llanura de Carrillo, fought two leagues from Cúcuta. As a result, the city fell into the hands of the royalists, and the patriots were forced to retreat to Málaga.

In response to the alarming news that put the northern provinces of the country at serious risk, the Congress of the United Provinces appointed the Scottish military officer, Brigadier Gregor MacGregor, as commander of the northern army to reclaim the area.

From Málaga, MacGregor and Santander launched a counterattack with 600 men in November 1813, successfully recapturing the provincial capital of Pamplona. However, the royalist forces, taking advantage of their numerical superiority, managed to regain control of the city on December 13.

Faced with this situation, the patriot troops were forced to retreat to Bucaramanga while reports emerged of the atrocities committed by the royalist forces under Captain Bartolomé Lizón in the occupied areas.

These events sparked a patriotic fervor in the provinces. According to historian José Manuel Restrepo, during this period: “The inhabitants of Socorro mainly took up arms, encouraged by their governor García Rovira, who gathered a respectable column in just a few days.”

Thanks to this fervor, the patriots managed to contain the enemy, despite having only 200 rifles. In February 1814, Brigadier MacGregor, along with Governor García Rovira as second-in-command and Colonel Santander as chief of staff, organized a division of 2,000 troops in Piedecuesta to launch a counteroffensive.

This campaign took place shortly afterward, resulting in the recovery of Pamplona on February 4 and the liberation of the Cúcuta valleys on February 14. Following these victories, MacGregor pursued Lizón to Táriba and La Grita on the other side of the Venezuelan border. However, shortly after, he requested leave from the government due to health issues.

Upon his departure, the government appointed Governor Custodio García Rovira as commander of the Northern Army, granting him the rank of colonel. However, although he accepted command, García Rovira chose not to make use of the colonel’s commission issued by the government.

For seven months, García Rovira led the Northern Army, commanding patriot troops in their fight against the royalists.

=== Triumvirate ===
On September 23, 1814, the Neogranadine Congress, modified the Federal Act relating to the seat of power, and replaced the Presidency with a Triumvirate, a three-member executive body, to rule over the country. Congress named Manuel Rodríguez Torices, José Manuel Restrepo, and García to head this triumvirate, but because they were not present to assume power, they were temporarily replaced by José María del Castillo y Rada, Joaquín Camacho, and José Fernández Madrid. García, however, resigned before ever taking possession of the presidency on November 15, 1815, Restrepo never actually accepted the presidency either, and both were permanently replaced in 1815 by general Antonio Villavicencio, and the ex president, José Miguel Pey.

=== Presidential nomination ===
On June 22, 1816, president Fernández Madrid, arrived in Popayán after fleeing the invasion of Bogotá by Pablo Morillo, once in Popayán he presented his resignation to the Permanent Legislative Commission of Congress, then assembled in Popayán. The commission named García as President-Dictator and Liborio Mejía as Vice President, the latter, however, became the acting President while García headed toward Popayán to accept the presidency.

=== Marriage ===
García, who was leading the forces behind Fernández Madrid on his way to Popayán, was delayed in a short and unforeseen event. When Bogotá was invaded, not only the President escaped, but also did other prominent figures of the city, among them the Piedrahita Family. One of their daughters was María Josefa Piedrahita y Sáenz, known to her family and friends as "Pepita". It is not sure whether they knew each other from before, but on the way to Popayán, Pepita, of only 16 years of age, caught the attention of Custodio, and María Josefa asked to take her with him, as she would prefer to face the dangers of the jungle than to be captured by the Spaniards, their mutual affection escalated, and Custodio asked María Josefa to marry her. And so, in the midst of war, in an improvised ceremony, they got married by Friar Francisco Antonio Florido, who was also fleeing Bogotá with them.

=== Presidency ===
Short after Liborio Mejía was vested with the presidential powers, he led his small army to face Juan Sámano in the Battle of Cuchilla del Tambo which culminated with the defeat of the patriots on June 29. Liborio Mejía escaped to La Plata where he met with García and ceded the presidency to him the next day June 30, thus assuming the presidency as first intended.

Unfortunately for both of them, and for the nation, Sámano caught on with them in La Plata, and defeated their weak outnumbered forces. They managed to escape but shortly after they were both captured and taken prisoners.

When they arrived at La Plata the small army they had left was confronted with an army of Spaniards commanded by colonel Carlos Toirá. A great effort was made to fight the Spaniards, but they were defeated on July 10, and those who managed to escape, including García, were captured a few days later. They were taken to Bogotá, and on August 8, 1816, García was executed by a firing squad in the Huerta de Jaime, now the Plaza de los Martires (Plaza of the Martyrs), his body was then hanged in the gallows, with a sign on him that read "García Rovira, el estudiante, fusilado por traidor" (es:García Rovira, the student, shot for being a traitor).

== Legacy ==
García died at the age of 36, leaving behind his wife María Josefa Piedrahita, to whom he had only been married less than two months. After the defeat of the Spaniards years later, Santander granted pension to the widows of the martyrs of the Independence, among them Piedrahita de García.

The Socorro Province, where he was born and served as governor of, was later renamed in his honor and is now the García Rovira Province.

In Bucaramanga, where he was born, the first statue ever erected in 1907 was in his honor; it was a metal sculpture by the German artist Xavier Arnold, and it is located in the park also constructed in his honor and named Parque García Rovira, in the center of the city, right next to the City Hall.

Also in Bucaramanga, the city commemorated the ex-president and painter opening the Casa de la Cultura Custodio García Rovira, a fine arts museum that holds exhibitions of different painters.
