= José Fernández Madrid =

President of United Provinces of New Granada

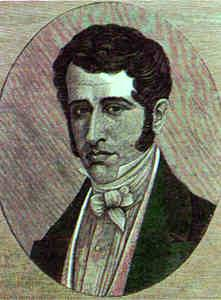

Presiding Member of the Triumvirate of the United Provinces of the New Granada
- In office October 5, 1814 – January 21, 1815
- Preceded by: Camilo Torres Tenorio
- Succeeded by: Triumvirate; Custodio García Rovira, Antonio Villavicencio, Manuel Rodríguez Torices

President of the United Provinces of the New Granada
- In office March 14, 1816 – June 22, 1816
- Preceded by: Camilo Torres Tenorio
- Succeeded by: Liborio Mejía

Envoy Extraordinary and Minister Plenipotentiary of Colombia to France
- In office March 25, 1827 – November 23, 1827

2nd Envoy Extraordinary and Minister Plenipotentiary of Colombia to the United Kingdom
- In office 27 March 1828 – 28 June 1830
- President: Simón Bolívar Palacios
- Preceded by: Manuel José Hurtado

Personal details
- Born: February 19, 1789 Cartagena de Indias, Bolívar, Colombia
- Died: June 28, 1830 (aged 41) Barnes, London, England
- Spouse: María Francisca Domínguez de la Roche
- Member President of the Triumvirate.

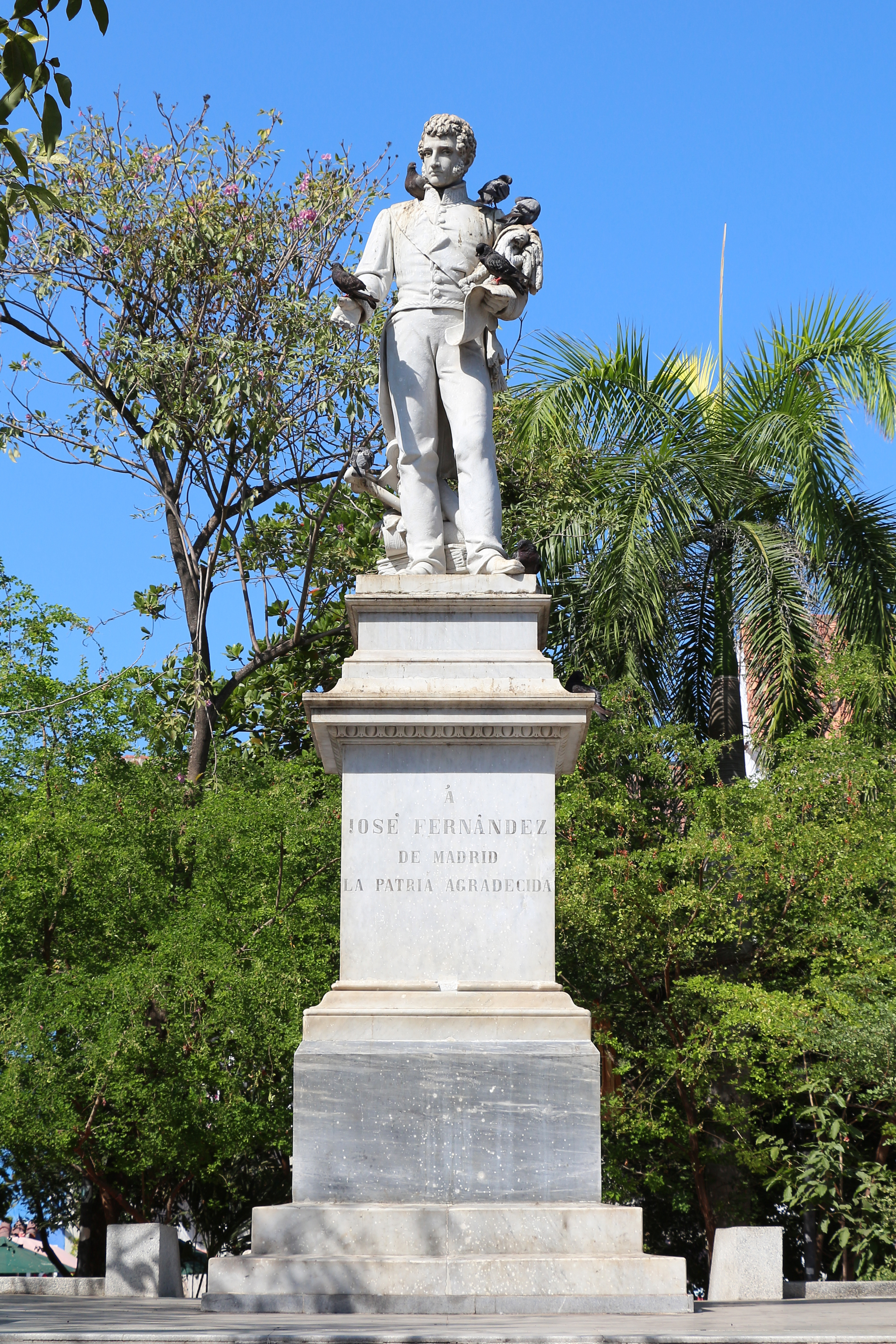
Plaza Fernandez Madrid, Cartagena, Colombia

José Luis Álvaro Alvino Fernández Madrid (February 19, 1789 – June 28, 1830) was a Neogranadine statesman, medical doctor, scientist and writer, who was President of the interim triumvirate of the United Provinces of New Granada in 1814, and President of the United Provinces of the New Granada in 1816. After the Spanish retook New Granada, he was barred from the country and was exiled in Havana, where he continued his scientific studies and worked as a doctor. He was later pardoned and allowed to come back to Colombia, and was appointed ambassador to France and to the United Kingdom where he died in 1830.

== Early life ==
Fernández was born in Cartagena de Indias, Bolívar, on February 19, 1789. Son of a wealthy aristocratic family of the New World, his father Pedro Fernández de Madrid y Rodríguez de Rivas, was born in Guatemala and held important positions in the Viceroyalty of the New Granada as a subdelegate intendant of the Spanish Army. His paternal grandfather, Don Luis Fernández Madrid was a knight of the Order of Calatrava and a member of the council to the King of Spain, and in the New World, served as oidor, or head judge, of the audiencias of Guatemala, and Mexico City. His mother was Doña Gabriela Fernández de Castro, daughter of Don Diego Fernández de Castro' who served as governor, captain general, and president of the Audiencia of Guatemala.

He began his studies in Cartagena de Indias, but his father was named Superintendent of the Royal Spanish Mint, and so the family moved to Santa Fe de Bogotá, where he continued his studies in the Our Lady of the Rosary University, in Bogotá. He initially graduated in humanities and canon law, but he went back to finish his doctorate in Medicine, graduating on February 16, 1809, all before the age of 20.

== Early political life ==
Amidst the revolutionary events of 1810, Fernández found himself in Cartagena, where he got his first job as Attorney General for the province of Cartagena, here he was part of the first revolutionary movements of the city when the province of Cartagena declared its absolute independence on November 11, 1811. He was later named representative to the Congress of the State of Cartagena de Indias. In 1812 Fernández was commissioned as representative of his province in the Congress of the United Provinces of the New Granada that was convened in Villa de Leyva. He excelled in Congress and was known for his intellect, and speeches, and his literary works gave him great standing image among his colleagues.

== Triumvirate ==
On October 5, 1814, the Supreme Junta of the United Provinces decided that the best political solution for the country was to name a triumvirate instead of a president to govern the country alone. Congress elected Custodio García Rovira, Manuel Rodriguez Torices, and Manuel Restrepo to preside over the triumvirate, but since all of them were absent, congress named José María del Castillo y Rada, José Joaquín Camacho and Fernández, as interim presidents of the triumvirate. The Interim Triumvirate ruled the country from October 5, 1814. Fernández presided over the triumvirate until March 28, 1815, when Custodio García was able to take power.

== Presidency 1816 ==
In 1816, the situation of the country was dire. The Spanish reconquest of the country was rapidly advancing under general Pablo Morillo from the royalist stronghold of Santa Marta. Cartagena de Indias had fallen to the Spaniards in December 1815 and Morillo had moved into the north of the country. Independence was being taken away. Many important figures were abandoning the political scene, no one wanted to be in the way of Morillo.

On March 14, 1816, Camilo Torres Tenorio resigned from the presidency. The Congress of the United Provinces of the New Granada asked Fernández to be the president of the United Provinces, he at first declined, knowing very well that he was not the right man for the job, and that he could not bring about a solution to the invasion, but upon pressure of his peers, he accepted and assumed the presidency.

On May 6, Santa Fe de Bogotá was invaded by the royalists, this event marked Spain's reconquest of New Granada.

So with only 27 years of age, and no military experience, Fernández marched with a handful of the remaining soldiers to the south. On June 22, 1816, Fernández presented his resignation to the presidency in Popayán to the Permanent Legislative Commission, who accepted it and named general Custodio García Rovira to the post, Liborio Mejía was named vicepresident, and becoming the acting president because Rovira was not present.

== Capture ==
On June 30, after the defeat of the Battle of Cuchilla del Tambo, the last battle of the Reconquista, Fernández and his wife are captured and taken prisoners in Chaparral while they were in search of the lands of the Andaquí Indians to seek refuge

Then, captured and facing the real threat of facing the Judges of War and Purification, who would have sentenced him to death as was the fate of many very important figures during the Reconquista, he pleaded for forgiveness—a mistake he would later regret—and he implored for a meeting with general Morillo. Because of his family's record of service to the king, and his lack of military action, his life was spared and sentenced to exile in Spain along with his wife, María Francisca Domínguez de la Roche, and his brother, Coronel Francisco Fernández Madrid. Morillo told him:

Within three days you will leave for the Capital [Madrid]. Go learn loyalty from your relatives! Do not think you are fooling me, you are an insurgent and you will be one till death.

== Exile ==
On June 5, 1820, the first edition of the newspaper El Argos came out, founded by Fernández. It ran for thirty-four editions and it had a revolutionary outlook and called for the unification of the peoples of America.

== Ambassadorship ==
José Fernández Madrid was named ambassador to the United Kingdom by Simón Bolívar on November 23, 1826 He was still in Paris when the government urged him to move to London as fast as possible. He was given an annual salary of 12,000 pesos. José Fernández Madrid arrived in London on April 30, 1827

== Legacy ==
His son, Pedro Fernández Madrid, who was born in Cuba during his exile, became an important politician and writer, following in the steps of his father, he worked as a congressman and was president of the Congress in 1857.

=== Literary works ===
- Poesías (1945)
- Guatimoc ó Guatimocin: Tragedia en cinco actos (1835)

=== Merit orders named for José Fernández Madrid ===
Established 22 July 1950, the Colombian Armed Forces honors Fernández by awarding the Order of Health Merit Jose Fernandez Madrid (Orden al Merito Sanitario José Fernández Madrid). This award is presented to members of the Military Medical Corps and other military personnel for acts of courage, distinguished service, or for outstanding service to science, military medicine, or medical instruction and investigation.
