= Caldas =

Caldas may refer to:

== Places ==
- Çaldaş, Azerbaijan
- Caldas Department, in Colombia
- Caldas, Antioquia, a town in Antioquia, Colombia
- Caldas, Boyacá, a town in Boyacá, Colombia
- Caldas, Minas Gerais, a town in the state of Minas Gerais in Brazil
- Poços de Caldas - a city in the state of Minas Gerais in Brazil
- Caldas de Reis, a municipality in Galicia, Spain
- Caldas (comarca), a comarca in the Province of Pontevedra, Galicia, Spain
- Caldas da Rainha, Portugal
- Caldas de São Jorge, a parish in the municipality of Santa Maria da Feira
- São João de Caldas de Vizela, a parish in the municipality of Vizela
- São Miguel de Caldas de Vizela, a parish in the municipality of Vizela

== People ==
- Francisco José de Caldas, Colombian lawyer and scientist, after whom the department and the town are named.
- António Pereira de Sousa Caldas, Brazilian poet

== Others ==
- ARC Caldas, ships of the Colombian Navy
- Caldas Sport Clube, a football club in Portugal
