= Bogotá Bulldogs =

Australian rules football club in Bogotá, Colombia

The Bogotá Bulldogs is an Australian rules football club based in Bogotá, Colombia. The team trains and plays at an altitude of 2600m, making for extremely trying conditions for any visiting opposition. The Bulldogs played against the Santiago Saints on September 3, 2016, in the first ever international Australian rules football game in South America where they were victorious 98 to 48, claiming the AFL Andes Cup.

== Results ==
	2019 Andes Cup
20 October 2019	Santiago (Chile) 142	def.	(Colombia) Bogotá 24	Lima, Peru	Report

	2018 Andes Cup
25 August 2018	Bogotá (Colombia) 66	def.	(Chile) Santiago 47	Los Pinos Polo Club, Bogotá, Colombia	Report

	2017 Andes Cup
22 July 2017	Santiago (Chile) 52	def. by	(Colombia) Bogotá 69	Santiago Saints Oval, Santiago, Chile	Report

	2016 Andes Cup
3 September 2016	Bogotá (Colombia) 94	def.	(Chile) Santiago 48	Del Rosario University, Bogotá, Colombia	Report
