= Camilo Torres =

Camilo Torres may refer to:

- Camilo Torres Restrepo (1929–1966), liberation theologian, priest and guerrilla member in Colombia during the 1960s
- Camilo Torres Tenorio (1766–1816), political leader of Colombia's independence struggle against Spain in the 1810s
