= José Miguel Pey =

Colombian statesman and soldier

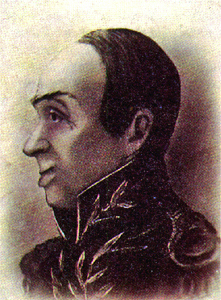
- "First President of Colombia"

Vice President of the Supreme Governing Junta of New Granada
- In office July 20, 1810 – July 25, 1810
- President: Antonio José Amar y Borbón

President of the Supreme Governing Junta of New Granada
- In office July 25, 1810 – April 1, 1811
- Preceded by: Antonio José Amar y Borbón
- Succeeded by: Jorge Tadeo Lozano as President of Cundinamarca

President of the United Provinces of the New Granada*
- In office March 28, 1815 – July 28, 1815
- Preceded by: Triumvirate; José María del Castillo y Rada, José Fernández Madrid, Joaquín Camacho
- Succeeded by: Camilo Torres Tenorio

Member of the Executive Presidium of the Republic of Colombia•
- In office April 30, 1831 – May 5, 1831
- Preceded by: Rafael Urdaneta
- Succeeded by: Domingo Caycedo

Personal details
- Born: March 11, 1763 Bogotá, Cundinamarca
- Died: August 17, 1838 (aged 75) Bogotá, Cundinamarca
- Party: Centralist
- Spouse: Juana Hipólita Bastidas
- President of the three-member governing Triumvirate.; •Member of the Executive Presidium of the Greater Colombia.

José Miguel Pey y García de Andrade (March 11, 1763 – August 17, 1838) was a Colombian statesman and soldier and a leader of the independence movement from Spain. He is considered the first vice president and first president of Colombia. He was a centralist.

== Background ==
Pey, a Criollo, was born on March 11, 1763, in Santa Fe de Bogotá, New Granada into a distinguished family. His father, Juan Francisco Pey, was an oidor of the Audiencia of Santa Fe de Bogotá, one of the most important positions at the time. Pey studied at the Colegio Mayor de San Bartolomé, graduating as a lawyer in 1787.

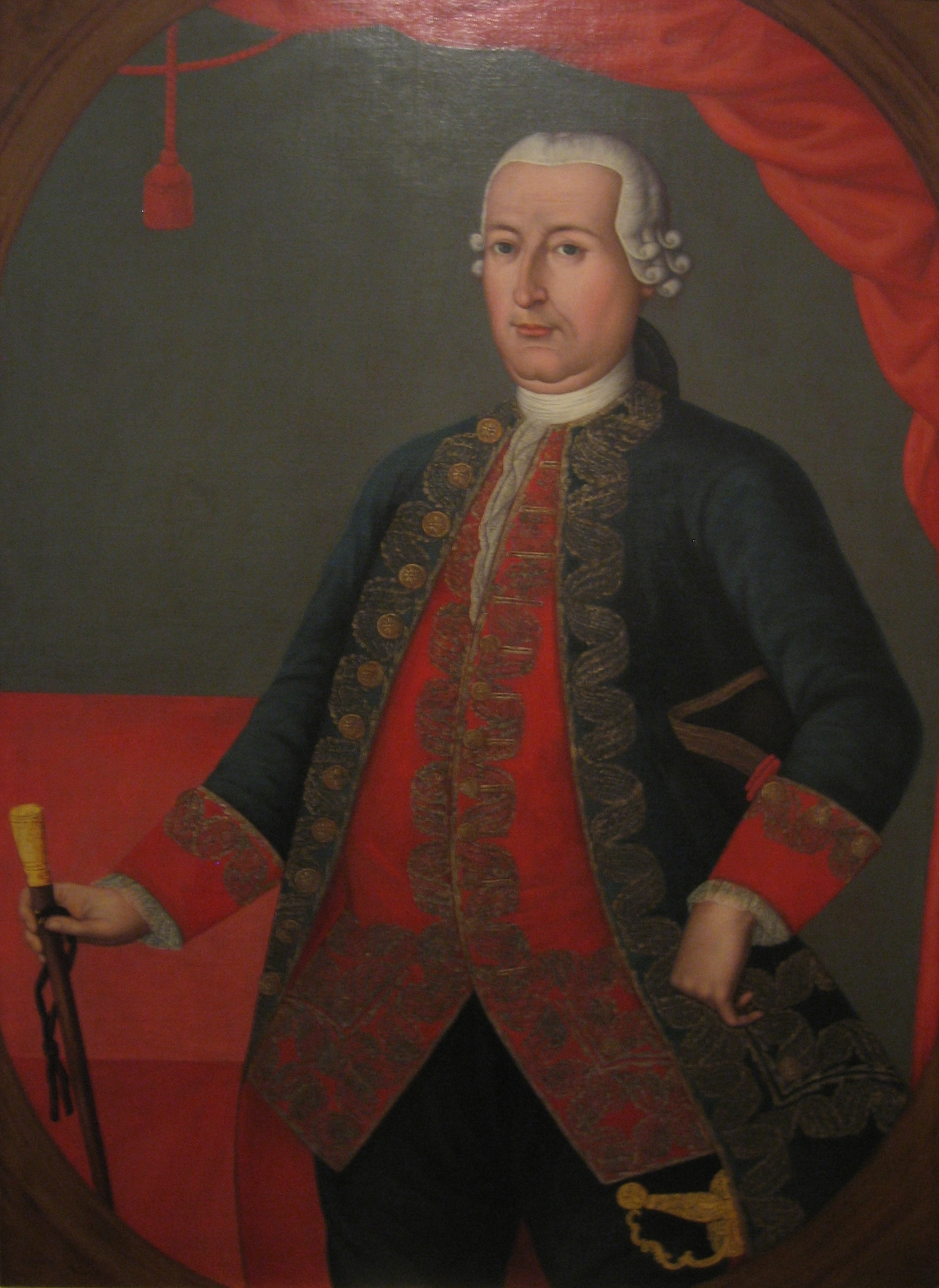
Viceroy Antonio José Amar

Under the rule of Viceroy Antonio José Amar y Borbón, Pey was elected alcalde of Bogotá, replacing José Antonio de Ugarte in January 1810. Within a few months, various independence riots broke out around the viceroyalty, and the turmoil soon arrived in the capital.

== Vice Presidency ==
Pey was alcalde of Bogotá at the time of the Cry of Independence, also known as the Florero de Llorente (Llorente Flower Vase) (July 20, 1810). On that morning, the history of the country changed; a group of Criollos accused José Gonzalez Llorente of discrimination and riots broke out all over the city. Pey, as the alcalde, tried to calm the populace. He proposed protective custody for Llorente, but by doing so he confirmed his culpability in the eyes of the general population and thus fueled the insurgency.

That same day a cabildo abierto was convened to decide the future of the city. The cabildo was formed by members of the Criollo oligarchy, both revolutionaries and royalists. The Cabildo opted to create a Junta Suprema (Supreme Governing Committee) with Viceroy Amar y Borbón as president and Pey as vice president. Amar was sworn in during the early hours of the next day. However, he refused to preside over the junta, and as a consequence, that duty fell to Pey. Pey thus became the first Criollo to exercise executive power in the Viceroyalty of New Granada. This Junta approved the Act of Independence, and Pey was one of the signers.

== Junta ==
On July 25, 1810, Amar y Borbón was removed from the Supreme Junta and Pey became president in his own right. The following day the Junta recognized King Ferdinand VII, but not the Regency in Spain.

Pey led the government with prudence, he himself maintaining loyalty to the House of Bourbon but in favor of regional independence. He was in a difficult situation mediating between the moderate and radical factions in the Junta and in the city. He was pressured to order the arrest of Viceroy Antonio José Amar and his wife the Vicereine María Francisca Villanová on August 13, 1810, but he was not in favor of this action. Shortly thereafter, he had the viceroy moved secretly out of Bogotá to Cartagena de Indias, where he could escape to Havana.

A Constitution of Cundinamarca was adopted in March 1811 for the province of Bogotá, and a congress of New Granadan provinces was convened. On April 1, with the election of Jorge Tadeo Lozano as resident of the congress, Pey's role as the chief executive in New Granada ended. The congress resulted in the creation of the United Provinces of New Granada in November, which Cundinamarca refused to join.

After forces of the United Provinces under the command of Simón Bolívar occupied Cundinamarca, Pey was named governor of the province on December 20, 1814.

== Triumvirate ==
On March 28, 1815, an Executive Triumvirate for the United Provinces of the New Granada was established. Custodio García Rovira, José Manuel Restrepo, and Manuel Rodríguez Torices were chosen as members of the triumvirate, but Restrepo declined and was never sworn in, so Pey was appointed in his place. He continued in this capacity until July 28 of the same year.

== Presidium ==
On April 30, 1831, after the resignation of the president of Gran Colombia, Rafael Urdaneta, Congress created a three-member Ejecutivo Plural, or Presidium, that delegated the powers of the presidency to Juan García del Río, Jerónimo Gutiérrez de Mendoza and Pey. Pey was vested with the powers of secretary of war. This presidium ended on May 5, 1831, when vice president Domingo Caycedo took power.

Pey was married to Juana Hipólita Bastidas. He died on August 17, 1838, at the age of 75 in Bogotá.

== See also ==
- Antonio José Amar y Borbón
- Pey family
