= Joaquín Camacho =

Colombian politician

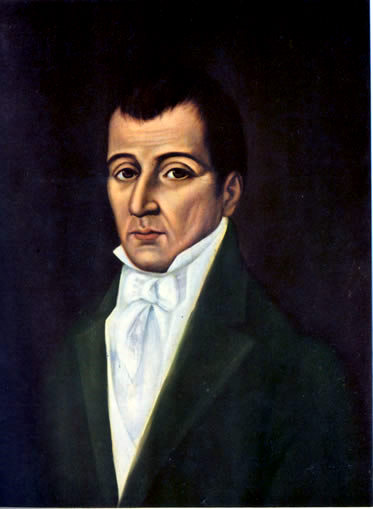
- 1825 portrait by Coriolano Leudo

President of the United Provinces of the New Granada*
- In office October 5, 1814 – January 21, 1815
- Preceded by: Camilo Torres Tenorio
- Succeeded by: Triumvirate; Custodio García Rovira, José Miguel Pey de Andrade, Manuel Rodríguez Torices

Personal details
- Born: José Joaquín Justo Camacho Lago; July 17, 1766 Tunja, Boyacá, Viceroyalty of the New Granada
- Died: August 31, 1816 (aged 50) Bogotá, Cundinamarca, United Provinces of New Granada
- Spouse: Marcelina Rodríguez Lago y Castillo
- Education: Our Lady of the Rosary University
- Member president of the Triumvirate.

José Joaquín Justo Camacho y Rodriguez de Lago (July 17, 1766 – August 31, 1816) was a Neogranadine statesman, lawyer, journalist and professor, who worked for the independence of the New Granada, what is now Colombia, and participated in the Open Cabildo which declared the Act of Independence, of which he was also a signer. He was executed during the Reign of Terror of Pablo Morillo after the Spanish invasion of New Granada.

== Early life ==
Camacho was born on July 17, 1766, in Tunja, which was part of the Viceroyalty of the New Granada, now Colombia. His parents were Francisco Camacho y Solórzano and Rosa Rodríguez de Lago y Castillo. He attended Our Lady of the Rosary University where he studied Jurisprudence. He was admitted as a lawyer by the Royal Audiency of Santafé de Bogotá in the year 1792. He became one of the most important lawyers of the viceroyalty and winning the admiration of his colleagues.

On June 13, 1793, Camacho married Marcelina Rodríguez de Lago y Castillo, a member of the prominent Sanz de Santamaría family on her mother's side. Together they had three children.

== Writing and journalism ==
Responding to a prize competition in 1808 by philanthropist Nicolás Manuel Tanco, Camacho wrote Memoria sobre la causa y curación de los cotos, an account of the cause and treatment for goitre; this remarkable work won the competition. The competition was a response to the situation of Bogotá, which at the time was having a small epidemic of goiter.

Camacho wrote for the Seminario del Nuevo Reino de Granada, a newsletter edited by Francisco José de Caldas, its most important contribution was in 1809, Relación territorial de la provincia de Pamplona en el Nuevo Reino de Granada, an extensive account of the Province of Pamplona at the end of the Colonial Period. In it is described its main cities, the fauna and flora of the region, the provincial limits and borders, and other geographical and botanical information about Pamplona.

Camacho started venturing more into journalism in 1810, when he co-edited the newspaper Diario Político, with Francisco José de Caldas. The Diario Politico first came out on August 27, 1810, and contained political articles related to the events of July 20 and thereafter. It ran three editions per week until February 1811.

== July 20, 1810 ==
On July 19, 1810, the precursors of the independence - Camilo Torres Tenorio, José Acevedo Gómez, José Miguel Pey and Jorge Tadeo Lozano, among others - held a secret meeting in the Astronomic Observatory of Bogotá, the office of Francisco José de Caldas. They had been informed of a plan by the Spaniards to arrest prominent criollos who had ideas of independence; the precursors were determined to win their independence and they, that night, planned the revolution. They were also convinced that the upcoming visit of the Regency Commissioners, Antonio Villavicencio and Carlos Montúfar, would bring the same results it had in Cartagena de Indias. Camilo Torres proposed that the first strike had to come from the Spaniards, to incite the people for an uprising and to prevent their supporters from doing something about it. Camacho would go to the house of the viceroy and ask him to allow a Junta to take place: they knew that he was going to oppose this, but would use it as the Spaniards' way of undermining the American people. Meanwhile, Luis de Rubio and Antonio Morales would go to the house of José Gonzales Llorente and start a mob uprising with the excuse of borrowing a flower vase, something they knew he would refuse giving Llorente's reputation.

The next day, Friday July 20, 1810, everything went according to their plan, and by night they had assembled an Open Cabildo. Don Camacho was part of this Cabildo, which wrote the first Declaration of Independence of Colombia, the Acta del Cabildo Extraordinario de Santa Fe, which declared the Viceroyalty of New Granada independent. Camacho was one its signers.

== Deputy of Congress ==
Camacho also participated in the Congress of the United Provinces of the New Granada, which was convened in Villa de Leiva, as a Deputy Representative for the Province of Tunja.

== Triumvirate ==
On October 5, 1814, the Congress of the United Provinces changed the Presidency of the United Provinces and replaced it with a Triumvirate, a three-member executive body. Congress nominated Custodio García Rovira, Manuel Rodríguez Torices and José Manuel Restrepo for the triumvirate, but they were all unable to assume the presidency, so Congress replaced them with José María del Castillo y Rada, José Fernández Madrid, and Camacho. Camacho exercised the executive power until January 2, 1815.

== Execution ==
Camacho was sentenced to death by Pablo Morillo and the War Council on August 31, 1816, and was executed by a firing squad on the same day, at the age of fifty. He was sick, blind and paralyzed and had to be carried in his wheelchair up the platform designated for his execution.

== Survivors ==
When Camacho died, his family was oppressed by the Terror Regime until the liberation by Simón Bolívar in 1819. His wife asked the Libertador to grant her a pension for her husband's sacrifice to the Nation. Bolívar personally asked congress for this and in 1820 a pension was given to her in his name. His daughter, Indalecia Camacho, who was also blind, received a pension from Congress on May 26, 1869. His niece, Juana Martínez Camacho, married Antonio Ricaurte.

== See also ==
- Camilo Torres Tenorio
- Francisco José de Caldas
- Spanish invasion of New Granada
