= ARC Caldas =

ARC Caldas is the name of the following ships of the Colombian Navy:

- ARC Caldas (1933), an Antioquia-class destroyer in commission 1934–1960; scrapped in 1961
- ARC Caldas (DD-02), ex-USS Willard Keith (DD-775), an Allen M. Sumner-class destroyer acquired in 1972 and scrapped in 1977
- ARC Caldas (FM-52), an Almirante Padilla-class frigate commissioned in 1984, center of the Caldas frigate crisis

== See also ==
- Caldas (disambiguation)
