= Səbətkeçməz =

- Location within Azerbaijan
- Coordinates: 40°30′25″N 45°43′29″E
- Country: Azerbaijan
- Rayon: Gadabay
- Municipality: Çaldaş
- Time zone: UTC+4 (AZT)
  - Summer (DST): UTC+5 (AZT)

Səbətkeçməz (also, Sabatkechmaz and Sabetkechmaz) is a village in the Gadabay Rayon of Azerbaijan. The village forms part of the municipality of Çaldaş.
