= First Republic of New Granada =

Period of Colombian history from 1810 to 1816

Flag of Cartagena and Barranquilla, based on the one for Cartagena State after 1811 and used provisionally for the United Provinces from 1813 to 1814

Flag of the United Provinces, 1814–1816

The First Republic of New Granada, known derogatorily as the Foolish Fatherland (Spanish: la Patria Boba), is the period in the history of Colombia immediately following the declaration of independence from Spain in 1810 as the first South American independent nation to break away from Spanish rule until the Spanish reconquest in 1816. The period between 1810 and 1816 in the Viceroyalty of New Granada (which included present-day Colombia) was marked by such intense conflicts over the nature of the new government or governments that it became known as la Patria Boba (the Foolish Fatherland). Constant fighting between federalists and centralists gave rise to a prolonged period of instability that eventually favored Spanish reconquest. Similar developments can be seen at the same time in the United Provinces of the Río de la Plata. Each province, and even some cities, set up its own autonomous junta, which declared themselves sovereign from each other.

== Establishment of juntas, 1810 ==
With the arrival of news in May 1810 that southern Spain had been conquered by Napoleon's forces, that the Spanish Supreme Central Junta had dissolved itself and that juntas had been established in Venezuela, cities in New Granada (modern-day Colombia) began to do the same and established their own. Antonio Villavicencio had been sent by the Spanish Cortes as a commissioner of the Regency Council of Spain and the Indies, a sort of ambassador of the Regency to the provinces. Villavicencio arrived to Cartagena de Indias on May 8, 1810, finding the city in political turmoil. Villavicencio used his appointment as commissioner to call for an open cabildo, which stimulated the creation of many provincial juntas just as the one that had been established in Cadiz.

On May 22, 1810, with Villavicencio's support, the open council forced Cartagena's governor to acquiesce to a co-government with two people chosen by the council, and then ousted the governor on June 14, establishing a government junta instead. This elicited the creation of similar juntas all over the viceroyalty: Cali on July 3, Pamplona the next day, and Socorro on July 10. On July 20, the viceregal capital, Santa Fe de Bogotá, established its own junta. (The day is today celebrated as Colombia's Independence Day.) The viceroy Antonio José Amar y Borbón initially presided over the junta in Bogotá, but due to popular pressure, he was deposed five days later.

Following the creation of the Supreme Governing Junta of Santa Fe, other juntas were established in Honda in July, Antioquia, Popayán, Neiva, Quibdó and Nóvita in August and September, and then Tunja in October. By then, smaller provinces and cities started making claims for larger autonomy within the provinces, as can be seen in the decision by the council of Mompós to disavow the authority of the Cartagena junta and to declare independence on August 6, or those by the recently established "Friend Cities of the Cauca Valley", between 1811 and 1812. These juntas made a case over their legality and legitimacy within the monarchy, and declared loyalty to Ferdinand VII, to the Catholic church, and to maintain ties with Spain. Although the Bogotá junta called itself the "Supreme Junta of the New Kingdom of Granada," the splintering of political authority continued as even secondary cities set up juntas that claimed to be independent of their provincial capitals, resulting in military conflicts. There were two fruitless attempts at establishing a congress of provinces in the subsequent months.

== First independent states and civil war ==
Current flag of the Department of Cundinamarca, based on the one used for the State of Cundinamarca, 1813–1814.

Current flag of the Department of Valle del Cauca, based on the one adopted by the Confederated Cities of the Cauca Valley on June 26, 1811, which used the colors of Our Lady of the Immaculate Conception.

Just as the local councils were fundamental in the attainment of a peaceful transfer of power, particularly in the large cities, they soon became a source of strife and territorial disintegration following the ousting of the regal authorities. In New Granada, the elites in the main cities were divided in regard to the support toward the government in Spain, with the juntas supporting sovereignty and other cities instead supporting Ferdinand VII and the regal authorities commanded by the Regency Council of Spain. Royalist factions commanded by Spanish officers managed to seize power in the cities of Santa Marta, Panamá (by then, still a part of the vice-royalty of New Granada), Popayán and Pasto, and soon engaged in conflict against the regions with autonomous governments. While the royalist regions were military weak and were often defeated by the juntas, they managed to become a source of destabilization which both maintained the idea of reconciliation with Spain alive, and drained the resources and energy of the patriotic governments. Some of these royalist cities became fundamental later in the military campaign for the reconquest of New Granada. Such division hence prevented the creation of a unified state in New Granada.

In addition to this, the provincial juntas were also divided on the question of the type of government that the new state should have. Disagreements on whether there should be a single state in the place of the old New Kingdom of Granada or whether the provinces should become autonomous and independent states became a matter of heated debate. The Supreme Junta of Santafé (in modern-day Bogotá) assumed that it would inherit the authority of the old regime, as it was the most prosperous and populated province in the vice-royalty, and it was in fact the seat of the Spanish viceroyalty. When the Cartagena junta called for a separate General Conference in Medellín, where each province would be represented in proportion to their populations, the Supreme Junta of Santafé decided to counter by inviting each province to send a delegate to form an interim government while a general congress was summoned to establish a Constitutional Assembly for the whole New Granada.

The congress was irregular from the start as it was formed by delegates from barely a handful of provinces (Santa Fe, Socorro, Neiva, Pamplona, Nóvita, and Mariquita), and was deeply divided on whether the cities of Mompós (part of the Cartagena province) and Sogamoso, which had sent delegates, should be considered provinces. In the congress, held between December 22, 1810, and February 2, 1811, Antonio Nariño became the leader of a push to establish Congress in Santafé, a proposal that was rejected by the remaining provinces, which saw in this a push for deferral to Santafé. The Congress was finally dissolved amid disagreements when the members stopped attending the sessions.

In the meantime, under the guidance of Jorge Tadeo Lozano, the province of Santafé transformed itself into a state called the Free and Independent State of Cundinamarca. In March 1811, it convened a "Constituent Electoral College of the State of Cundinamarca," which promulgated a constitution for the state the following month. The constitution followed the model of the Constitution of the United States, and established Cundinamarca as a constitutional monarchy under (absent) Ferdinand VII (it would only declare full independence from Spain in August 1813). The Cundinamarca state also attempted to impose its political model by way of a strategy that involved annexing neighboring regions and towns, while attempting to create alliances with Venezuela to balance out the power of the big provinces, such as Cartagena and Popayán. During this period, Antonio Nariño became an ardent critic of federalist ideas and the key promoter of the idea of a strong republican government centered in Santafé. Nariño created a newspaper, La Bagatela, on July 14, 1811, which became the main outlet of his views against the adoption of federalism for New Granada. Nariño became president of Cundinamarca in September 1811, vouching for a centralized republic. Following a failed royalist coup d'état, Cartagena became the first province in New Granada to formally declare its independence from Spain on November 11, 1811 (the day is also today a national holiday in Colombia).

The "Congress of the United Provinces," meanwhile, started meeting again. Despite Cundinamarca's opposition, the Congress finally achieved an agreement and delivered the Act of Federation of the United Provinces of New Granada on November 27, 1811, which was written by Camilo Torres and signed by the deputies of five provinces. The Act established a confederation of equal and independent, sovereign states called the United Provinces of New Granada. Each state would have a representational government elected by its own people, and would exert the legislative and executive powers with full responsibility falling on internal administration. The Act also provided some power to the General Congress, which had as its function the issues of common defense, international affairs, and war and peace. An extremely weak president position was created, who would be subordinate to the congress. The establishment of the judicial power was delayed until the risk of war had disappeared. The act, however, failed to integrate New Granada as a whole entity, particularly due to the energetic opposition of Cundinamarca, and only made the differences between centralist and federalist ideas even stronger.

Nariño and his followers became ardent opponents to federalism and to the congress, and were convinced that the economic and political power of Cundinamarca would allow it to dominate and unify New Granada. Nariño convened an assembly to revise the constitution of the state and make it even more centralist, and then decided to annex the surrounding provinces of Tunja, Socorro, Pamplona, Mariquita, and Neiva, but was mostly unsuccessful on both enterprises. Nevertheless, the members of the Congress had to leave Bogotá as a result of the harassment, and later relocated to Leyva and finally to Tunja. Cartagena had by then become the main rival for the centralist ideas.

=== Civil War ===
The animosity between Nariño's centralist factions and the federalist factions in the Congress, led by Torres, soon spread to the respective regions. The Free and Independent State of Cundinamarca and the United Provinces of New Granada (the Congress now located in the province of Tunja) engaged in constant conflict, and soon became embroiled in Civil War. Nariño ordered General Antonio Baraya to defeat the federalist leaders in Tunja, but Baraya decided to switch sides and support the federalist forces, and many important leaders like Santander and Caldas joined him. Baraya and the rebels with him signed an act that declared Nariño an usurper and a tyrant, and pledged loyalty to the Congress. Nariño used the opportunity to request extraordinary powers from the legislature of Cundinamarca, which allowed him to be appointed as a dictator. On November 26, 1812, Nariño left with his army to conquer Tunja. On December 2, 1812, his army faced a federalist army commanded by Antonio Ricaurte and Atanasio Girardot in the Battle of Ventaquemada, and was soundly defeated, having to retreat back to Bogota. The federalist troops, however, only started pursuing more than a week later, giving Nariño's troops enough chance to plan a defense. Santafé was sieged by Baraya's troops on December 24. On January 9, 1813, in the Battle of San Victorino, Nariño's troops proved superior and the federalist armies were completely defeated.

The first civil war hence resulted in a sort of stalemate, which nevertheless allowed Cundinamarca to organize an expedition against the royalist regions of Popayán and Pasto, and Quito in July 1813. Nariño assembled his 'Army of the South,' numbering 1500 to 2000 men, and managed to capture Popayán in January 1814, but was then defeated by the Royalist forces in Pasto, after which he was arrested in May 1814, and then sent to the Royal prison at Cádiz. The failure of the campaign and the capture of Nariño left an enfeebled Cundinamarca, so the United Provinces took the opportunity to send an army against it, headed by Simón Bolívar, who had fled Venezuela for the second time after the fall of the Second Republic of Venezuela. Bolívar and his army forced the submission of Cundinamarca to the United Provinces by December 1814. Meanwhile, Cartagena had been engaged in war against the then-Royalist city of Santa Marta, and was in chaos following its defeat.

== Aftermath: Spanish reconquest of New Granada ==
Impoverished by the civil wars between federalist and centralist factions, as well as the squirmishes and wars against Royalist cities, the provinces were in a precarious position already by the end of 1814. This added to the fact that many in the recently independent provinces had never rejected the legitimacy of Ferdinand VII as sovereign king, and that despite the independence movement, the political and cultural life in the provinces was largely unchanged and still under the powerful influence of Spain. In addition, the Catholic Church had mostly opposed independence. By mid-1815 a large Spanish expeditionary force under Pablo Morillo had arrived in New Granada, which bolstered earlier royalist advances made by Santa Marta. Morillo laid siege on Cartagena in August and it finally fell five months later in December with the city suffering large numbers of civilian casualties due to famine and disease. By May 6, 1816, Morillo and royalists from the south had conquered Bogotá, and hence returned all of New Granada to royalist control, which lasted until August 1819, when forces under the command of Simón Bolívar retook the central part of the region.

== See also ==
- Spanish American wars of independence
- History of Colombia
- Viceroyalty of New Granada
- United Provinces of New Granada
- Gran Colombia
- Antonio Nariño
- Spanish reconquest of New Granada
- Bolívar's campaign to liberate New Granada

== Bibliography ==
- Blossom, Thomas. Nariño: Hero of Colombian Independence. Tucson: University of Arizona Press, 1967.
- McFarlane, Anthony. Colombia Before Independence: Economy, Society, and Politics under Bourbon Rule. Cambridge: Cambridge University Press, 1993. ISBN 978-0-521-41641-2
- Earle, Rebecca. Spain and the Independence of Colombia, 1810–1825. Exter: University of Exter Press, 2000. ISBN 0-85989-612-9
