= Çaldaş =

- Municipality
- Location within Azerbaijan
- Coordinates: 40°30′40″N 45°42′24″E
- Country: Azerbaijan
- Rayon: Gadabay

Population
  - Total: 1,772
- Time zone: UTC+4 (AZT)
  - Summer (DST): UTC+5 (AZT)

Çaldaş (also, Chaldash) is a village and municipality in the Gadabay Rayon of Azerbaijan. It has a population of 1,772. The municipality consists of the villages of Çaldaş and Səbətkeçməz.
