= Francisco José de Caldas =

Colombian lawyer and scientist (1768–1816)

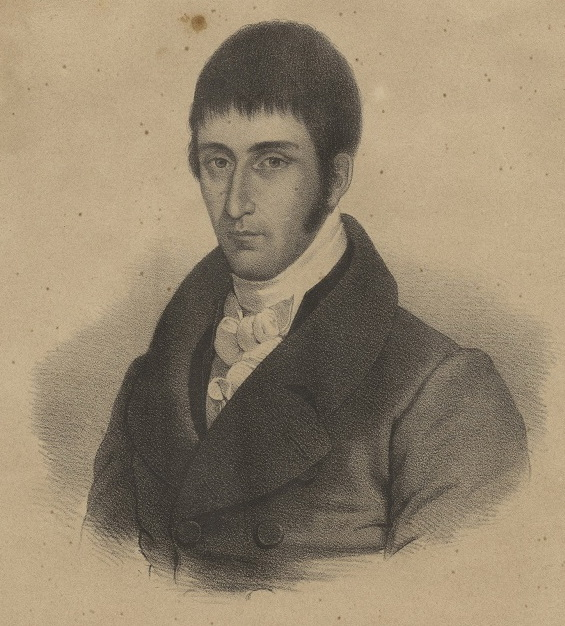
- Lithography of Francisco José de Caldas by José María Espinosa, 1836
- Born: Francisco José de Caldas y Tenorio; 4 October 1768; Popayán, Viceroyalty of New Granada
- Died: 28 October 1816 (aged 48); Bogotá, Cundinamarca, United Provinces of New Granada
- Cause of death: Execution by firing squad
- Resting place: Iglesia de San José; Popayán, Cauca, Colombia; 2°26′33.68″N 76°36′41.19″W
- Other name: El Sabio ("the wise")
- Education: Lawyer
- Alma mater: Colegio Mayor de Nuestra Señora del Rosario
- Occupations: Military Engineer, Geographer, Botanist, Astronomer, Writer
- Known for: Precursor of the fight for the independence of Colombia. Geographer, mathematician, astronomer and inventor of first hypsometer.
- Parent(s): José de Caldas y Gamba; Vicenta Tenorio y Arboleda

Francisco José de Caldas (October 4, 1768 – October 28, 1816) was a Neogranadine lawyer, military engineer, self-taught naturalist, mathematician, geographer and inventor (he created the first hypsometer), who was executed by orders of General Pablo Morillo during the Spanish American Reconquista for being a forerunner of the fight for the independence of New Granada (modern day Colombia). Arguably the first Colombian scientist, he is often nicknamed "El Sabio" (Spanish for "The learned," "The sage" or "The wise").

== Biography ==
=== Early life ===
Caldas was born in Popayán, in 1768. His parents were José de Caldas and Vicenta Tenorio, the aunt of fellow independence hero Camilo Torres Tenorio. Like his cousin, Caldas studied in the Seminary of Popayán, where he met others of the leaders of the Colombian independence movement like Francisco Antonio Zea. Similarly to his cousin, in 1788 and pressed by his father he moved to Santafé (modern day Bogotá) to study jurisprudence in the Colegio del Rosario, where he obtained a bachelor's degree in 1793. As a student, Caldas was always interested in the study of mathematics, astronomy and the natural sciences, and he only studied law as a result of his father's pressure. Following this, he relocated to Popayán, to administer the family businesses and as a trader, a craft in which he was very unsuccessful.

== Scientific and academic career ==
During his many business trips to Santafé, Caldas was more concerned with scientific observation and devoted long hours to determine geographical coordinates and to make observations. He was particularly concerned with determining the geographical location and altitude of different places, so he was always using a barometer, a thermometer, and a compass. His interest on determining altitude and the fortuitous breaking of a thermometer led to his development of the hypsometer, an apparatus that determined altitude as a function of the boiling point of water. His studies and records of the time survive in both his letters and memoirs, including a map of the course of the Prado river in the department of Tolima, notes about medicinal trees, a description of the stone hieroglyphs in Aipe and of the statues at San Agustín, experiments to determine whether an insect was venomous, and many others. His descriptions about the leveling in the plants growing close to the equinoctial line were sent to José Celestino Mutis, and as a consequence Mutis appointed him to the Royal Botanical Expedition to New Granada.

Following a trip to Quito, he then traveled to Ibarra to meet Alexander von Humboldt and Aimé Bonpland, on December 31, 1801. Considering that he was situated in the relative backwater of Popayán, Humboldt was impressed with his scientific accomplishments. Caldas gave Humboldt and Bonpland data on the altitudes in the region and became their personal friend, and was mentored by them in the study of botany. Together they did some exploration in the surroundings of Quito. Unable to continue traveling with Humboldt, he devoted wholeheartedly to scientific enterprises, and to write his memoirs.

After traveling through Peru and Ecuador, and across the New Kingdom of Granada exploring the newfound land, studying flora, fauna, geography, meteorology and cartography, Caldas returned to Santafé in 1805, where he started working for the Botanical Expedition. Mutis charged him with directing the recently built Astronomic Observatory. During this time he also created a newspaper, "El Semanario," in 1808, where many of his academic writings were published. Caldas expected to be appointed director of the Botanical Expedition following Mutis' death in 1808, but Mutis had appointed his nephew Sinforoso Mutis, instead. Caldas was, nevertheless, confirmed as director of the Astronomical Observatory, and was in charge of studying the flora of Bogotá. He was appointed also as a lecturer of elementary mathematics at the Colegio del Rosario.

== Political and military life ==
=== July 20, 1810, and the Colombian Declaration of Independence ===
In 1809, following the death of Mutis, future independence leaders like Caldas' cousin Camilo Torres, and Antonio Nariño, started meeting clandestinely in one of the halls of the Observatory. While Caldas certainly allowed the meetings, his involvement was minimal as he was more interested in his scientific enterprises. During this period he published his "Scientific Memoirs," a continuation of his Semanario.

Caldas was actively involved, nonetheless, in the events of July 20, 1810. Following the lead of cities like Cartagena de Indias, which had created their own juntas, a plot was developed to stimulate the formation of a junta in Santafé. The plot famously consisted of borrowing a flower vase or some other object from a Peninsular Spaniard, José González Llorente, to use it in a celebration for the arrival of commissioner of the Regency Antonio Villavicencio to the city, taking advantage of the fact that Villavicencio's arrival had brought hundreds of people to the city. The plot creators were hoping that Llorente would refuse, and would use the refusal to call for the formation of a Junta, and to do so, Caldas agreed to drop by at the time of the request so that he could be "reprimanded" for dealing with a Spaniard who was mistreating the creoles. As planned, the "offended" started shouting the offenses by Peninsular Spaniards, and calling for the installation of a Junta. This led, as planned, to a city revolt following which Viceroy Amar peacefully agreed to the formation of the Santafé junta. The date of the formation of this junta is considered the official Day of Independence of Colombia.

=== After the Declaration of Independence ===
Following the events of July 20, Caldas and Joaquín Camacho were asked to create the first newspaper of the newly founded Republic, called the "Diario Político de Santafé de Bogotá" (Political Journal of Santafé de Bogotá), first published on August 27, 1810. The Diario published a complete description of all the events surrounding the creation of the Junta, and published articles about political economics and the political decisions of the Junta. Caldas kept publishing his Scientific Memoirs during this period.

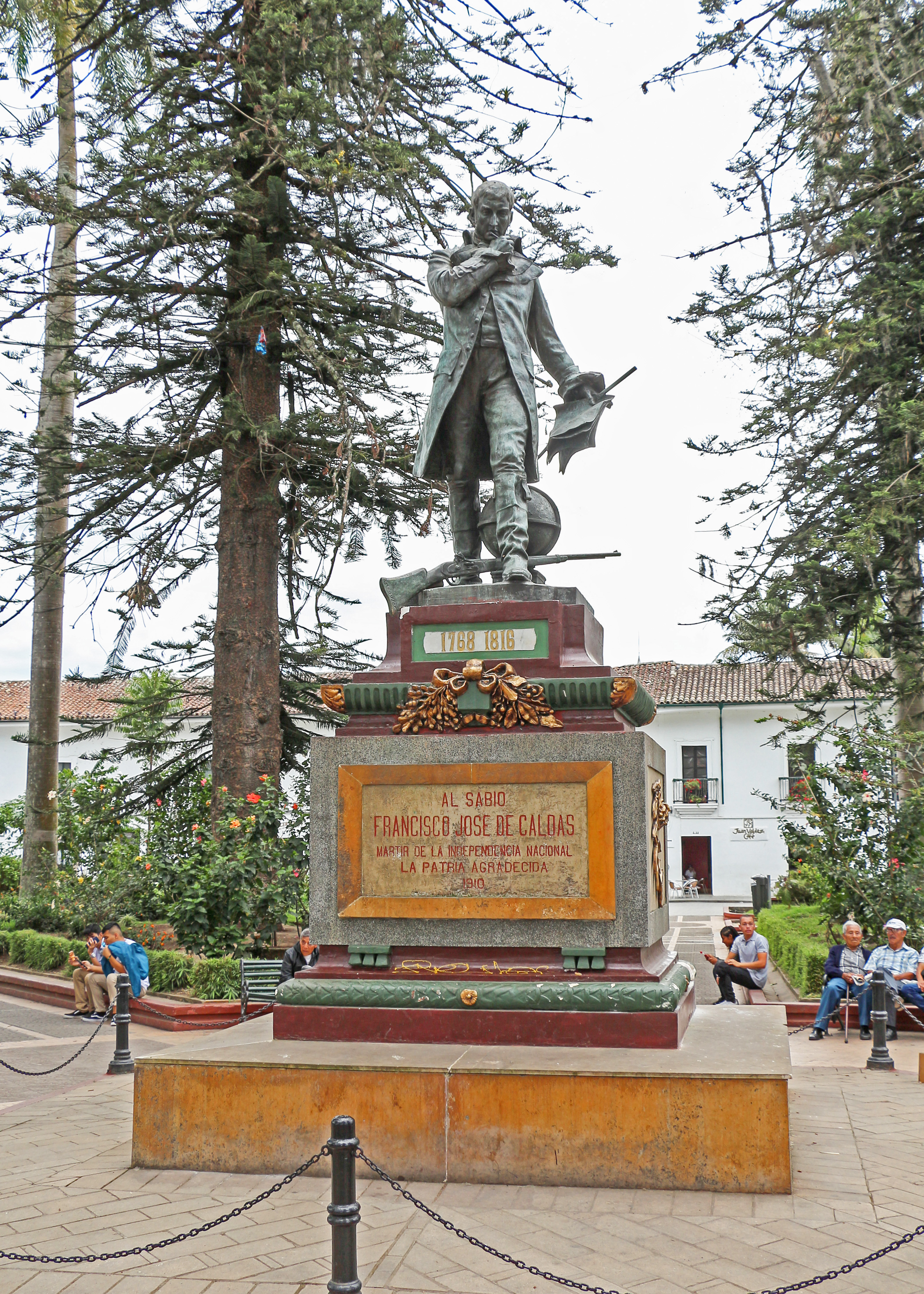
Statue of Francisco José de Caldas in Popayán

In September 1811, Antonio Nariño was appointed as President of the Free and Independent State of Cundinamarca. One of his first actions as a president was the formation of the Army Engineer Corps, and Caldas was then appointed to them as a Captain, and charged with making plots of roads and itineraries. Caldas was part of the troops sent by Nariño, under the command of General Antonio Baraya, to defeat the federalists that were assembled in the Congress of the United Provinces in Tunja. Baraya, however, decided to switch factions and support the federalist forces, and Caldas joined him, signing the act that declared Nariño an usurper and a tyrant, and supporting the Congress in May, 1812. Caldas was appointed as member of the Military Commission of the Congress, and was given the rank of Lieutenant Colonel, and was involved in the Battle of Ventaquemada on December 2, 1812, on which the federalist troops were victor, and in the Battle of San Victorino (or Battle of Santafé de Bogotá, San Victorino y Las Cruces), on January 9, 1813, where the federalist troops were utterly defeated.

After being defeated in the rebellion, Caldas, fearing reprisals, escaped to Popayán, but finding that it had been overtaken by the royal troops commanded by future viceroy Juan Sámano, went then to the province of Antioquia. Antioquia had declared independence as the "State of Antioquia" or the "Free and Sovereign State of Antioquia." The Antioquia state had appointed Juan del Corral as a dictator, and del Corral welcomed Caldas and appointed him to create a Military School and as Director of Rifle Factories and General Engineer, as well as giving him the rank of Colonel. As an engineer, Caldas was in charge of erecting buildings, powder mills, and gun factories, as well as coin minting. He also taught in the Academy of Engineers in Medellín, in 1814. Between 1813 and 1814, he took charge of the fortifications along the Cauca River and the installation of a rifle and gunpowder factory. By the end of 1814, Nariño had been defeated and arrested by the Spanish crown, and Bolívar and his army had forced the submission of Cundinamarca to the United Provinces. The federalist General Government, which had been established in Santafé, with growing concerns about the possibility of a Spanish reconquest following the start of Morillo's campaign, then called Caldas to appoint him with the creation of a similar Military School, and to build bridges, trenches, and fortifications around the city. He was sent to the northern army and to fortify roads in Quindío.

== Death ==
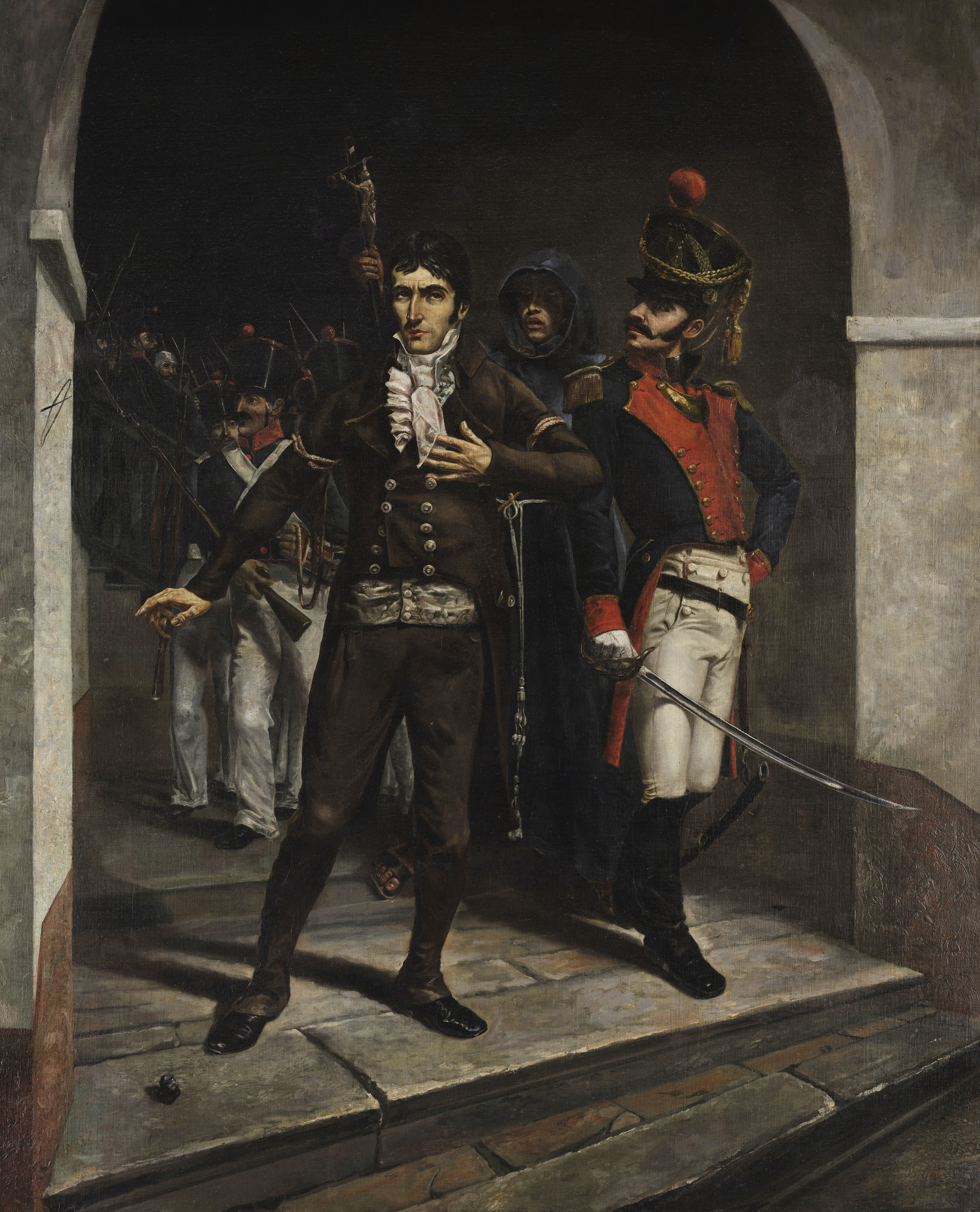
Caldas Marches to Martyrdom by Colombian painter Alberto Urdaneta.

Pablo Morillo finally captured Santafé on May 6, 1816. Like the other leaders of the Independence movement, Caldas escaped the city, originally with the goal of getting to Buenaventura to escape abroad. On the way, however, future viceroy Sámano gained a victory over the Republican troops in the Battle of la Cuchilla del Tambo, reconquering Popayán, and Caldas was forced to hide in the Paisbamba Farm in Sotará, where he was soon arrested by the Spanish Royalists.

He was then sent back to Santafé, and executed by a firing squad on October 29, 1816, in the San Francisco Plaza by orders of Morillo, Count of Cartagena. When Caldas was about to be executed and the people present at the place appealed for the life of the scientist, Morillo responded: "Spain does not need savants" (Spanish: "España no necesita sabios"). Before dying Caldas wrote on the wall a large Greek letter θ, which has been interpreted as exclaiming "Oh long and dark departure!" (Spanish: ¡Oh larga y negra partida!. In classical Athens, Theta was used as an abbreviation for the Greek θάνατος (thanatos, “death”).

His body was buried in the Church of Veracruz, which was later turned into the Panteón Nacional (National Pantheon) but later moved to the Panteón de los Próceres in his hometown, Popayán.

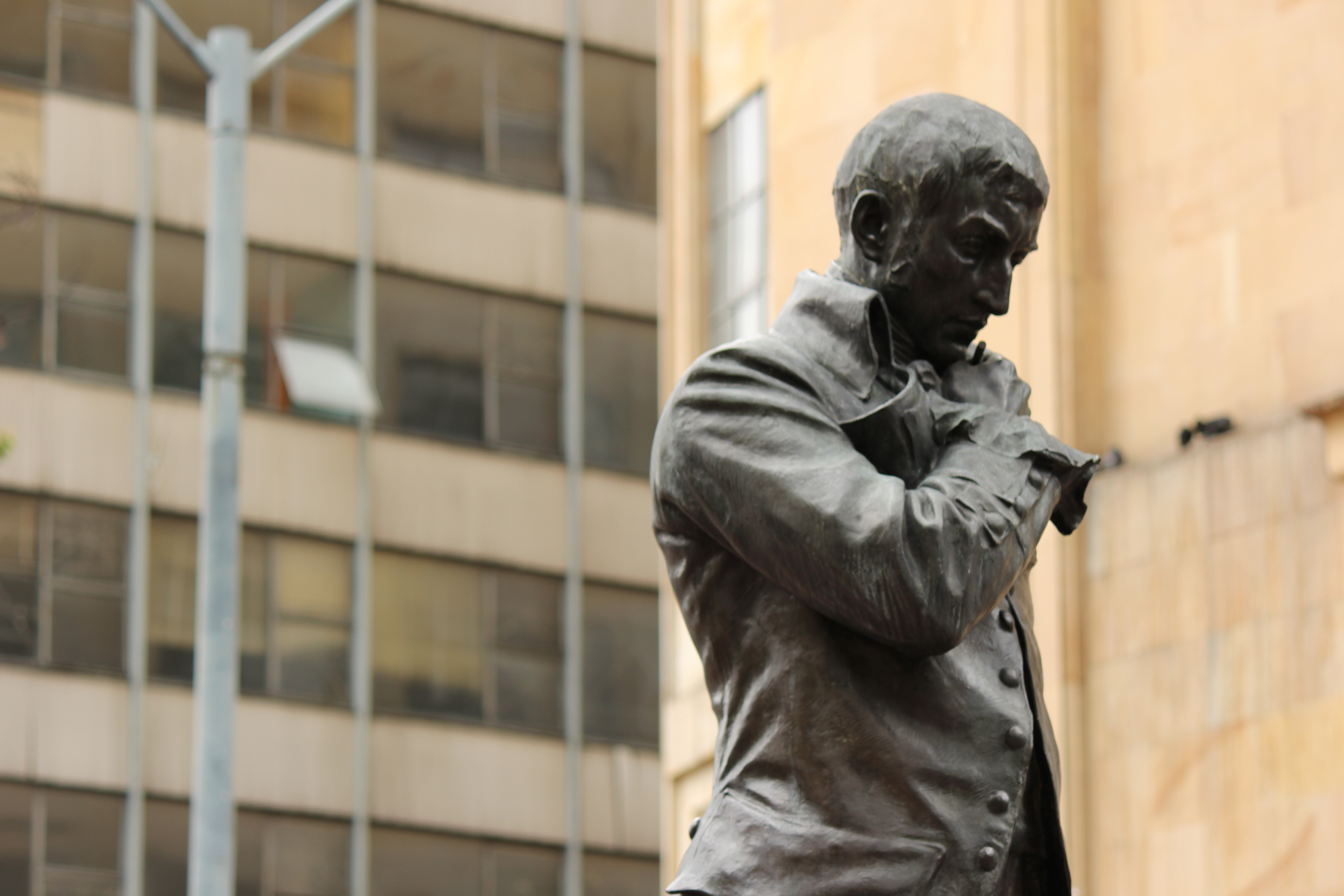
Monument of Francisco José de Caldas on the Plaza de Caldas, Bogotá

== Legacy ==
Caldas helped fund the New Kingdom of Granada Seminary, intended to be a scientific institution during the first decade of the 1800s. In 1810, he founded the Diario Político de Santa Fe (Political Diary of Santa Fe) which ultimately defended the independentist movement. During this time Caldas became engineer's colonel designing an artillery apparatus for the revolutionaries.

Due to his work in the Army Engineer Corps, he is considered by some authors the "father of Colombian engineering".

The Colombian department of Caldas is named for Francisco José de Caldas.

The Francisco José de Caldas District University, a large public university in Bogotá is named after him.

The “Francisco José de Caldas” Scholarship for Doctoral Programs is awarded by the Departamento Administrativo de Ciencia, Tecnología e Innovación (Colciencias) for Colombians to study toward a PhD.

Caldas' face appeared in the $20 Colombian peso banknotes.

=== Books ===
- "El estado de la geografía del virreinato con relación a la economía y al comercio" (1807)
- "El influjo del clima sobre los seres organizados" (1808)
- "La Memoria sobre la Nivelación de las Plantas del Ecuador, Historia de Nuestra Revolución, Educación de Menores, Importancia del Cultivo de la Cochinilla y Chinchografía y Geografía de los Arboles de Quina
