= United Provinces of New Granada =

Period of Colombian statehood from 1810 to 1816

United Provinces of New Granada Provincias Unidas de la Nueva Granada (Spanish)
- 1811–1816
- Flag Coat of arms

- United Provinces of New Granada (in red)
- Capital: Tunja
- Common languages: Spanish (de facto)
- Religion: Roman Catholic
- Government: Revolutionary republic
- First President
- History
  - Independence declared: July 20, 1811
  - Establishment of the executive triumvirate: 5 October 1814
  - Incorporation of Cundinamarca: December 1814
  - Reconquest by Spain: September 3, 1816
- Currency: Real
Preceded by	Succeeded by
Viceroyalty of New Granada; Free and Independent State of Cundinamarca	Viceroyalty of New Granada

The United Provinces of New Granada was a country in South America from 1810 to 1816, a period known in Colombian history as la Patria Boba ("the Foolish Fatherland"). It was formed from areas of the New Kingdom of Granada, roughly corresponding to the territory of modern-day Colombia. The government was a federation with a parliamentary system, consisting of a weak executive and strong congress. The country was reconquered by Spain in 1816.

== Government ==
=== The Triumvirate ===
After two attempts at establishing a congress, the State of Cundinamarca managed to convene a Congress of the United Provinces, which met in late 1811. It issued an Act of Federation on November 27, 1811, which allowed Congress to establish a separate executive branch, if it felt it was required. An executive, consisting of a triumvirate, was created in 1814 after a royalist army from Pasto and Popayán defeated one from Cundinamarca (which had not accepted the Union and, in fact, had even sent troops against it). Congress nominated Manuel Rodríguez Torices, President of the State of Cartagena; José Manuel Restrepo, Antioquia's Secretary of State; and Custodio García Rovira, Governor of the province of Socorro. At the time of the nomination, the nominated officials were exercising their jobs, so they were temporarily replaced by members of Congress: Joaquín Camacho, Representative for the Tunja Province, José María del Castillo y Rada and José Fernández Madrid, both Representatives for the Cartagena Province. The triumvirate was inaugurated on October 5, 1814.

On January 12, 1815, Congress arrived in Santa Fe de Bogotá, after its army, headed by Simón Bolívar, had forced Cundinamarca into the Union in December 1814. The interim triumvirate was replaced on January 21, 1815, by the original nominated members, with the exception of Joaquín Camacho, who had turned down the nomination. The first president of the triumvirate was José Miguel Pey de Andrade, who at the moment was serving as the governor of Bogotá. On August 17, García Rovira, who had presented his resignation as President of the Triumvirate to Congress on July 11, was replaced by Antonio Villavicencio.

=== Administrative divisions ===
The Act was ratified by the provinces of Antioquia, Cartagena, Neiva, Pamplona and Tunja. Under the Act of Federation each province was free to write its own constitution and form its own government. Other regions of the New Kingdom of Granada established their own governments and confederations (for example, the Confederated Cities of the Cauca Valley, 1811–1812) or remained royalist.

At the beginning of the revolution, the larger Viceroyalty of New Granada consisted of 22 provinces. The provinces were under the jurisdiction of two audiencias.

The Royal Audiencia of Quito, whose president had executive powers, had jurisdiction over the provinces of Quito, Cuenca, Loja, Ibarra, Riobamba, Pasto, Popayán, Buenaventura and parts of the Cauca River Valley. These provinces were located in what are now the Republic of Ecuador and the southern part of Colombia.

The Royal Audiencia of Santa Fe de Bogotá, had jurisdiction over the provinces of Panamá and Veragua in what is now the Republic of Panama, and the provinces of Antioquia, Cartagena de Indias, Casanare, Citará, Mariquita, Neiva, Nóvita, Pamplona, Riohacha, Santafé, Santa Marta, El Socorro, and Tunja. The Audiencia of Quito, despite an attempt at establishing a junta between 1809 and 1812, remained a Royalist stronghold throughout the wars of independence.

The territory of the Captaincy General of Venezuela had been part of the viceroyalty, but had become independent of it when the captaincy general was established in 1776, and therefore, never became part of the United Provinces. The Captaincy General had jurisdiction over the provinces of Coro, Cumaná, Guayana, Maracaibo, Venezuela or Caracas (central Venezuela), and Margarita Island, and it had its own audiencia and superintendency based in Caracas. After the Revolution the captaincy general established itself as a republic.

== See also ==
- First Republic of New Granada
- Spanish reconquest of New Granada
- Bolívar's campaign to liberate New Granada

== Bibliography ==
- Gibson, William Marion (1948). The Constitutions of Colombia. Durham: Duke University Press.
