= Antonio Villavicencio =

Spanish statesman and soldier

Antonio Villavicencio y Verástegui
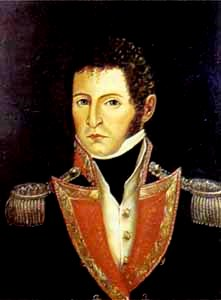

President of the United Provinces of New Granada*
- In office August 17, 1815 – November 15, 1815
- Preceded by: Custodio García Rovira
- Succeeded by: Camilo Torres Tenorio

Personal details
- Born: January 9, 1775 Quito, Ecuador
- Died: June 6, 1816 (aged 41) Santafé de Bogotá, Colombia
- Spouse: Gabriela Sánchez Barriga y Brito
- Member President of the Triumvirate.

Antonio Villavicencio y Verástegui (January 9, 1775 – June 6, 1816) was a statesman and soldier of New Granada, born in Quito, and educated in Spain. He served in the Battle of Trafalgar as an officer in the Spanish Navy with the rank of Second Lieutenant. He was sent as a representative of the Spanish Crown to New Granada, where his arrival was used as an excuse in Santafé de Bogotá to start a revolt; this was known as the Florero de Llorente, which culminated in the proclamation of independence from Spain. After this incident he resigned his office and joined the cause of independence. He was later captured and became the first martyr executed during the reign of terror of Pablo Morillo.

== Early life ==
Villavicencio was born on January 9, 1775, in Quito, Ecuador, which at the time formed part of the Viceroyalty of New Granada. His parents were Juan Fernando de Villavicencio y Guerrero, II Count of the Real Agrado and Knight of the Order of Santiago, and Joaquina Verástegui y Dávila, daughter of the Oidor and Mayor of the Real Audiencia of Santa Fe de Bogota.

Villavicencio attended Our Lady of the Rosary University in Bogotá and afterwards his parents sent him to Spain to study in the Real Colegio de Nobles Americanos (Royal College of Noble Americans) in the city of Granada. There he joined the Spanish Navy (Armada Española) and attained the rank of Second Lieutenant. He then returned to Cartagena de Indias in New Granada as Lieutenant of a frigate patrolling the Atlantic Coast.

In 1804 he returned to Spain and served in the navy in the Napoleonic Wars. He fought in the Battle of Trafalgar on October 25, 1805, serving as Second Lieutenant of Antonio de Escaño.

== Villavicencio as representative of the Crown ==
In 1810 the Regency in Spain was concerned how news of the dissolution of the Supreme Central Junta had been received in America. The Court decided to send Regency commissioners to serve as its ambassadors to America and to explain the situation in Spain. Two Criollos and one Peninsular were chosen to go to South America: Carlos Montúfar as envoy to Quito, José de Cos Iriberri as ambassador to the Viceroyalty of Peru, and Villavicencio as envoy to New Granada.

=== Caracas ===
Villavicencio and his colleagues left Cádiz aboard the schooner La Carmen on March 1, and arrived at La Guaira on March 18. There they were urged to sail on to Caracas, where they arrived in time to witness the events of April 19, the day on which the people of Caracas deposed the Captain General of Venezuela, Vicente Emparán, and established a Venezuelan Supreme Junta, which gave way to the start of the First Republic of Venezuela.

=== Cartagena de Indias ===
After his stop in Venezuela, Villavicencio headed to Cartagena de Indias, where he arrived on May 8. There he found the political situation very tense, and the Governor of Cartagena, Francisco Montes, was using violence and terror to control the province. The people of Cartagena had called for an open cabildo, a sort of public forum, to discuss the situation and devise a solution, but the Governor was opposed to this proposal. Antonio Villavicencio, however, was not, and using his position as an official representative of the Crown, called for the open cabildo. On May 10 the Ayuntamiento of Cartagena formed a junta, composed of native-born Spaniards (peninsulares) and locally born people of Spanish ancestry (criollos) alike; among them were: Antonio Villavicencio, Carlos Montúfar, Governor Francisco Montes, and José María García de Toledo. The Junta recognized the Crown of Spain and Ferdinand VII as King of Spain, rather than Napoleon's brother, Joseph Bonaparte, whom he had installed on the Spanish throne as José I. Villavicencio found no reason to oppose the desire for local autonomy as long as the Junta de Cartagena acknowledged the supremacy of the Crown. This event set off a wave of revolution across the land, and was soon followed by other juntas declaring independence: Santiago de Cali on July 3, Pamplona on July 4, and Socorro on July 9.

=== Santafé de Bogotá ===
In Santafé de Bogotá, capital of the Viceroyalty, word arrived of the events in Cartagena, and of the arrival of the Regency Commissioner Villavicencio in that city. The people of Santafé had been waiting anxiously for his arrival, as they hoped it would further their drive for independence. On the morning of July 20, 1810, Joaquín Camacho visited the Viceroy Antonio José Amar y Borbón to see if his request to open a cabildo had been granted, but the viceroy dismissed the idea with arrogance. This caused the revolutionaries to begin devising a plot to launch their revolution. Using the arrival of Villavicencio as an excuse, they went to the house of José Gonzales Llorente to borrow a flower vase; he refused, and insulted them as well. Francisco José de Caldas seized on this incident to incite the crowds to stand up to the Peninsulars, forcing José Miguel Pey, the mayor of Bogotá, to step in and save Llorente. By that night the situation had heated up so much that a special Cabildo was called in session. This led to its issuing the declaration of independence of New Granada from the Regency in Spain, but declared loyalty to Ferdinand VII.

While he was in Honda, Villavicencio was informed of the events of July 20 by Juan Merino, the alcalde of Honda. When he arrived in Bogotá he was informed that the Junta no longer recognized the authority of the Regency Commission; he responded by resigning from the commission and embracing the patriotic cause.

Villavicencio immersed himself in the fight for independence, and was appointed commander of a battalion in the southern campaign of Antonio Nariño. In 1814 he was made the military advisor to the United Provinces of New Granada.

== Triumvirate ==
On October 5, 1814, The Congress of the United Provinces replaced the presidency with a Triumvirate, a three-member executive body, to govern the nation. Custodio García Rovira, one of the members of the Triumvirate, presented his resignation on July 11, 1815, to Congress. Congress named Villavicencio to replace him. Villavicencio accepted and on August 12, he resigned his post as Governor of Tunja, and headed to Santafé de Bogotá, where he was inaugurated as President of the Triumvirate of the United Provinces of the New Granada.

His presidency was short lived, however; on November 15, 1815, Congress once again changed the executive power, entrusting it to a President Dictator and a vice president.

== Capture, trial and execution ==
After serving in the triumvirate, Villavicencio became Governor of Honda, where on May 20, 1816 he was captured by the Royalist Army and transported to Santafé. On June 1 the Permanent Council of War sentenced Villavicencio to death. On June 6, he was taken out of his cell and his military insignia removed to degrade him, and then he was executed by a firing squad. Thus Villavicencio, whose visit to Santafé had aroused the anger of the royalists and led to the colony breaking away from Spain, became the first victim of the reign of terror begun with the pacificación (pacification) campaign of the Spanish general, Pablo Morillo, under which many other revolutionaries were sentenced to death, imprisoned or exiled.

== Legacy ==
- Villavicencio, the capital of Meta Department and the largest city of the Orinoquía region of Colombia, was named in his honor.

== See also ==
- Patria Boba
- Peninsular War
- Reconquista (Spanish America)
