= José María del Castillo y Rada =

Colombian politician

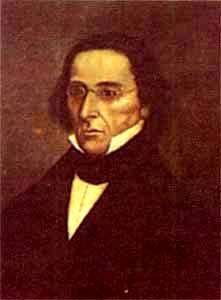

President of the United Provinces of the New Granada (&)
- In office October 5, 1814 – January 21, 1815
- Preceded by: Camilo Torres Tenorio
- Succeeded by: Triumvirate: Manuel Rodríguez Torices; José Miguel Pey de Andrade; Custodio García Rovira

4th Vice President of the Gran of Colombia
- In office June 6, 1821 – October 3, 1821
- President: Simón Bolívar
- Preceded by: Antonio Nariño
- Succeeded by: Francisco de Paula Santander

Personal details
- Born: December 20, 1776 Cartagena de Indias, Bolívar
- Died: June 5, 1833 (aged 56) Bogotá, Cundinamarca
- Spouse: Teresa de Rivas y Arce
- Relatives: Manuel del Castillo y Rada (brother)
- (&) Member President of a Triumvirate.

José María del Castillo y Rada (December 20, 1776, in Cartagena de Indias – June 5, 1833, in Bogotá) was a neo-granadine politician, President of the United Provinces of the New Granada from October 5, 1814, until January 21, 1815. Castillo y Rada also served as Vice President of the Republic of Colombia from June 6, 1821, until October 3, 1821. His younger brother, Manuel del Castillo y Rada was a neogranadine general.
