= Universidad del Rosario (Colombia) =

Colombian private university

Coordinates: 4°21′36″N 74°02′32″W

- Colegio Mayor de Nuestra Señora del Rosario Universidad del Rosario
- Latin: Collegium Maius de Rosario
- Other name: "El Rosario" "UR"
- Motto: Nova Et Vetera ("Always old, always new")
- Type: Private
- Established: December 18, 1653; 372 years ago
- Principal: Ana Isabel Gómez
- Faculty: 1,627
- Students: 12,393
- Undergraduates: 8,297
- Postgraduates: 3,903
- Location: Cll. 12C No. 6 -25, Bogotá, Colombia
- Campus: The Cloister (El Claustro), Quinta de Mutis, Northern Campus.
- Colors: crimson
- Website: www.urosario.edu.co

The University of Rosario, officially Colegio Mayor de Nuestra Señora del Rosario, is a Colombian private university founded on Roman Catholic principles, by Fray Cristóbal de Torres in 1653. Located in Bogotá, due to its important place in Colombian history, it is known as "the Cradle of the Republic". Most faculties reside at the Cloister, the main campus located in the historic-geographical centre of Bogotá. It also included a private all-male traditional primary and secondary school until 2008.

Nowadays the institution is based on secular ideas and remains very influential in Colombian culture and public life. At least 28 of Colombia's presidents have been students of this university. It has influenced and participated in very important transitional processes like the revolution for the independence from Spain and the drafting of the Political National Constitution of 1991. One of the most important 1886 Constitution's Supreme Court (1936), the so-called golden court, was composed in its majority by lawyers from the Faculty of Jurisprudence.

== History ==
Under the authorization of King Philip IV of Spain, the archbishop of Santa Fe, Cristóbal de Torres founded the Colegio Mayor de Nuestra Señora del Rosario in 1653. By the Royal Decree of 1768 Charles III recognized the institution as a 'College' among with the six halls of Spain, which continued the tradition of the University of Salamanca. Original constitutions of the university, were written by its founder Fray Cristóbal de Torres and published by Crístobal de Araque Ponce de León, then Chancellor.

The founder established the Calatrava Cross as the symbol of the university and issued the Constitutions, which remain as the governing documents of the school. The University of El Rosario has always been "from" and "for" the students, established on the basis of "Universitas Scholarium".

It is Colombia's oldest higher education institution, never having interrupted instruction during its almost 360 years of existence, except for a couple of years in 1819 when General Morillo of Spain pursued reconquest of Colombian territory. During those years it served as a prison, and many of the republic's most notable characters were held imprisoned at the university.

Jose Celestino Mutis taught astronomy and mathematics at the university beginning on March 13, 1762. He is buried at the university's chapel. For over five years, from 1762 to 1767, Jose Celestino Mutis was a professor of El Rosario. He taught mathematics and physical and natural sciences, both in Latin.

In 1790 after several attempts to consolidate the Faculty of Medicine, Dr. Vincent Cancino Román was appointed responsible of the Medicine Program. Of his initial disciples only one, the young Juan Bautista Vargas, graduated in 1974, shortly before the death of his preceptor. It then became the first medical school in Colombia.

It is the only Colombian university that made an accreditation process, supported by the European Association of Universities. It is ranked as "Very Superior" by the ICFES.

== Directives ==
The "Consiliatura" is composed by the Rector, who chairs the "Consiliatura", and five members, who are called "Consiliarios". It's the supreme governing body of the University of El Rosario. Besides acting as advisory board to the Rector, it takes care of the university's assets and approves the annual budget of revenues and expenses, among other functions conferred by the Old and New constitutions.

The "Consiliarios" are chosen by an electoral body composed by the Rector and the fifteen "Colegiales", for a period of four years with the possibility of an indefinite re-election. The "Consiliatura" has the responsibility to call the election and elect the president ("Rector") among with "Colegiales".

Current "Consiliarios" are Andrés Cadena Venegas, Alberto Fergusson Bermúdez, Andrés López Valderrama, Víctor Hugo Malagón Basto and Ann Mason.

The current rector of the Universidad del Rosario is José Manuel Restrepo Abondano, elected on September 22, 2014. He graduated from the Economics Program of the Rosary, where he also completed the Specialization in Finance. He has a master's degree in economics from London School of Economics, Specialist in Management of Inalde and PhD in management of institutions of higher education at the University of Bath.

The vice rector is Stéphanie Lavaux. Political scientist at the Institute of Political Studies (IEP) in Toulouse, France. DEA (Master) political science with an emphasis in international relations at the University of Social Sciences of Toulouse, where he is currently pursuing a doctorate in political science. She was director of the Center for Political and International Studies (CEPI), a research group of the Faculty of Political Science and Government and International Relations between 2002 and 2011.

The "Consiliatura" appoints the Síndico' (trustee) for the same period of the rector and may hold office indefinitely. The trustee is responsible for the management of the resources and assets of the university and must submit an annual report to the then Consiliatura. Miguel Francisco Diago Arbeláez is the current 'Síndico'.

The mission of the 'Secretaría General' (secretary-general) is to certify the institutional acts of the university, acting as notary and guaranteeing the legality of the decisions adopted by the university's authorities. The 'Secretaria General' also ensures the conservation and restoration of the historical heritage of the university and supports the rector and the Consiliatura in the fulfillment of their responsibilities. The current 'Secretaria General' is Catalina Lleras Figueroa.

== Undergraduate programs ==
The university has five faculties, which are: Faculty of Jurisprudence, Faculty of Natural Sciences, Faculty of Economics, Faculty of International, Political and Urban Studies and Faculty of Creative Studies. It also has 4 schools which are: School of Administration, School of Human Sciences, School of Medicine and Health Sciences and School of Engineering, Science and Technology. Each of these faculties and schools offers undergraduate and postgraduate degrees.

A male primary/secondary school, which shared its name (Colegio Mayor de Nuestra Señora del Rosario) was founded as part of the university.

== Symbols ==
The symbols of the University of El Rosario are:

The Virgin of "La Bordadita": "the Bordadita" Virgin is the Patroness of the university. The chapel is named in her honor.

The Historic Archive: preserves original documents on the history of the university, which are also part of the historical memory of Colombia. The oldest document dates from 1646. It is the response of King Philip IV of Spain to the intention of the Archbishop of Santafé, Don Cristobal de Torres, to form the Universidad Colegio mayor nuestra señora del Rosario, following the model of the College Archbishop in Salamanca. Among the most significant documentary series are: real ballots, information and cleaning of nobility of blood, decrees on education, text books and medieval tuition books.

The Cloister: this architectural symbol is in the Historic Center of Bogotá, separated from the Avenida Jimenez de Quesada by Plazoleta del Rosario and located at 14th Street and Old Town Street, classified by experts as the oldest in the city, thus informing the Teusaquillo Zipa with the urban areas demarcated by the conquerors. The cloister, was built in the colonial era in Spanish seventeenth century architecture style by Fray Cristobal de Torres. It has been declared a "National Architectural and Cultural Heritage" good. In its interior, it is possible to admire the statue of the founder, Fray Cristóbal de Torres, erected in bronze by Catalan sculptor Renart Dionisio Garcia in 1909.

This landmark has been preserved throughout these three centuries almost in its entirety. The Aula Máxima, where the protocolary ceremonies are held, is one of the best art galleries in the country, with beautiful paintings dating from 1700.

"The Cloister" is listed as a National Heritage Monument of the Republic of Colombia. The 200 Colombian pesos banknote (noe out of circulation) has in his reverse the image of the Cloister of the Del Rosario University and the La Bordadita Chapel, as well as in his obverse the portrait of Jose Celestino Mutis, university teacher.

== Academics ==
University rankings

Global – Overall
- QS World: 781-790 (2026)

Regional – Overall
- QS Latin America: 46 (2015)

== Notable alumni ==
In almost four centuries of history, many distinguished figures have been formed at the Universidad del Rosario, including twenty-eight presidents of the Republic and many other members of their Cabinets. There has never been a government in Colombian history that is not composed by at least one alumni from the university. Among them:

- Camilo Torres Tenorio (precursor and martyr of the Independence)
- Francisco José de Caldas y Tenorio (precursor and martyr of the Independence)
- Joaquín Camacho Lago (precursor and martyr of the Independence)
- Salvador Camacho Roldán (chairman-designate to the presidency)
- Carlos Holguín Mallarino (former president of Colombia)
- Ramón González Valencia (former president of Colombia)
- Miguel Abadía Méndez (former president of Colombia)
- Dario Echandia (former president of Colombia)
- Eduardo Santos (former president of Colombia)
- Alberto Lleras (former president of Colombia)
- Alfonso López Michelsen (former president of Colombia)
- Andrés Pastrana (former president of Colombia)
- Germán Vargas Lleras (former vice president of Colombia)
- Samuel Moreno Rojas (former mayor of Bogota)
- Rafael Uribe Uribe (Leader of the Liberal Party)
- Marco Gerardo Monroy Cabra (former president of the Inter-American Commission on Human Rights and former president of the Constitutional Court of Colombia)
- Jaime Castro Castro (former minister of government, former senator of Colombia and former mayor of Bogotá)
- Viviane Morales Hoyos (former attorney general of Colombia)
- Nancy Patricia Gutiérrez (former president of the Senate)
- Mauricio González Cuervo (former president and current magistrate of the Constitutional Court of Colombia)
- Beatriz Uribe Botero (former minister of the environment and sustainable development)
- Néstor Osorio Londoño (permanent representative of Colombia to the United Nations and former executive director of the ICO)
- Camilo Ospina Bernal (former Ambassador to the Organization of American States, former minister of national defense and former legal secretary of the presidency)
- José Manuel Restrepo Abondano, Minister of Finance and Public Credit and Minister of Commerce, Industry and Tourism of Colombia
- Abelardo de la Espriella, lawyer, businessman, and politician

Primary/Secondary Male School (Colegio Mayor de Nuestra Señora del Rosario):

- Daniel Coronell (secondary school, columnist)
- Álvaro Mutis (secondary school, novelist and poet)
- Alberto Lleras Camargo (secondary school, former president of Colombia)
