= France–Venezuela relations =

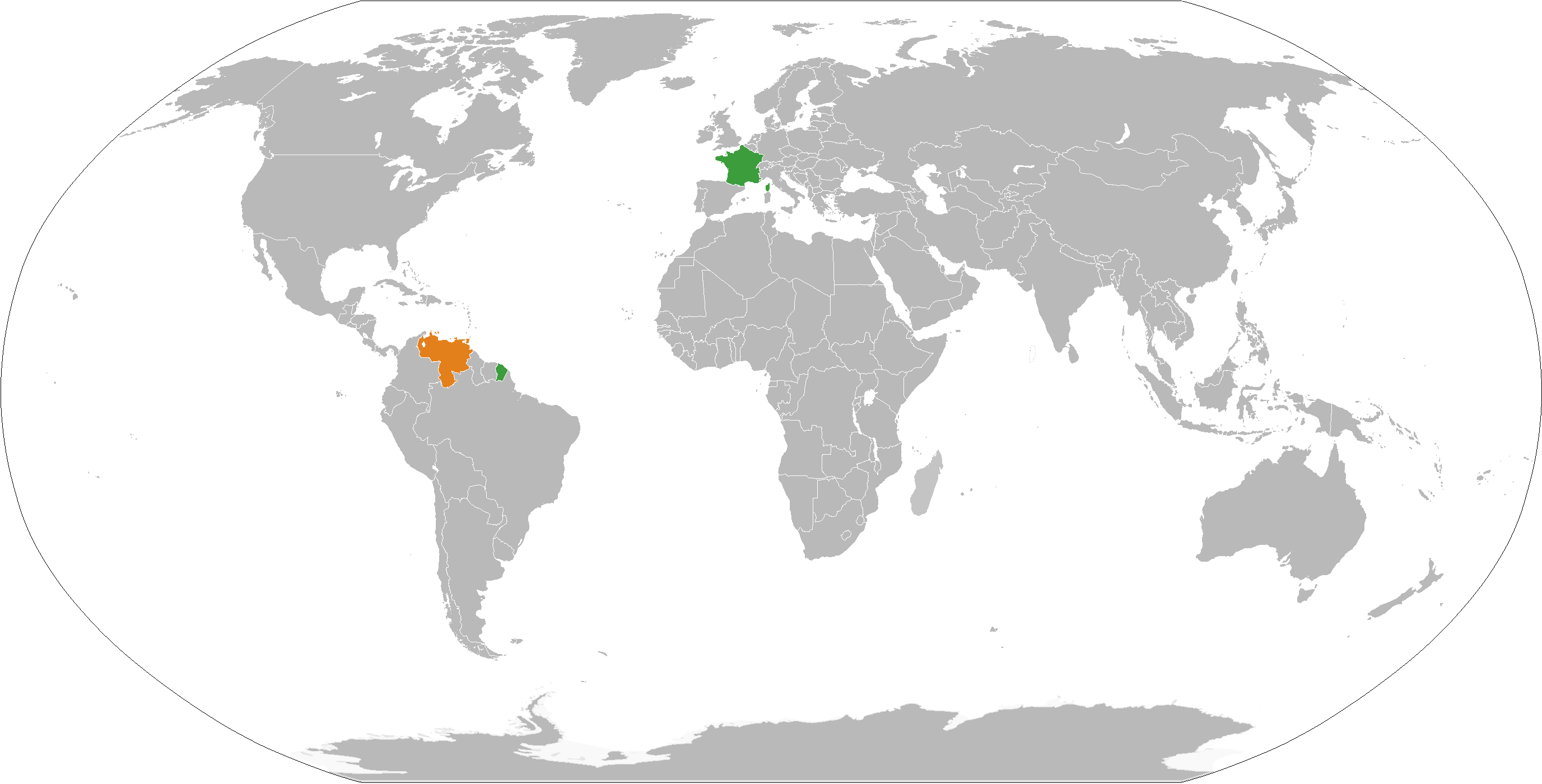
- France: Venezuela

France–Venezuela relations are the foreign relations between France and Venezuela. France has an embassy in Caracas and Venezuela has an embassy in Paris.

== Francisco de Miranda ==
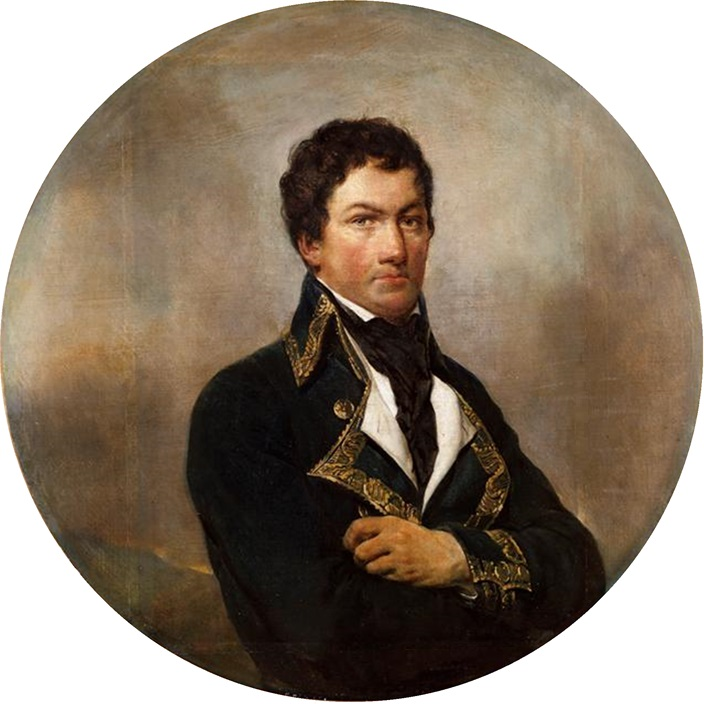
Francisco de Miranda, général de division of the Army of the North in 1792, portrait by Georges Rouget (1835), Palace of Versailles.

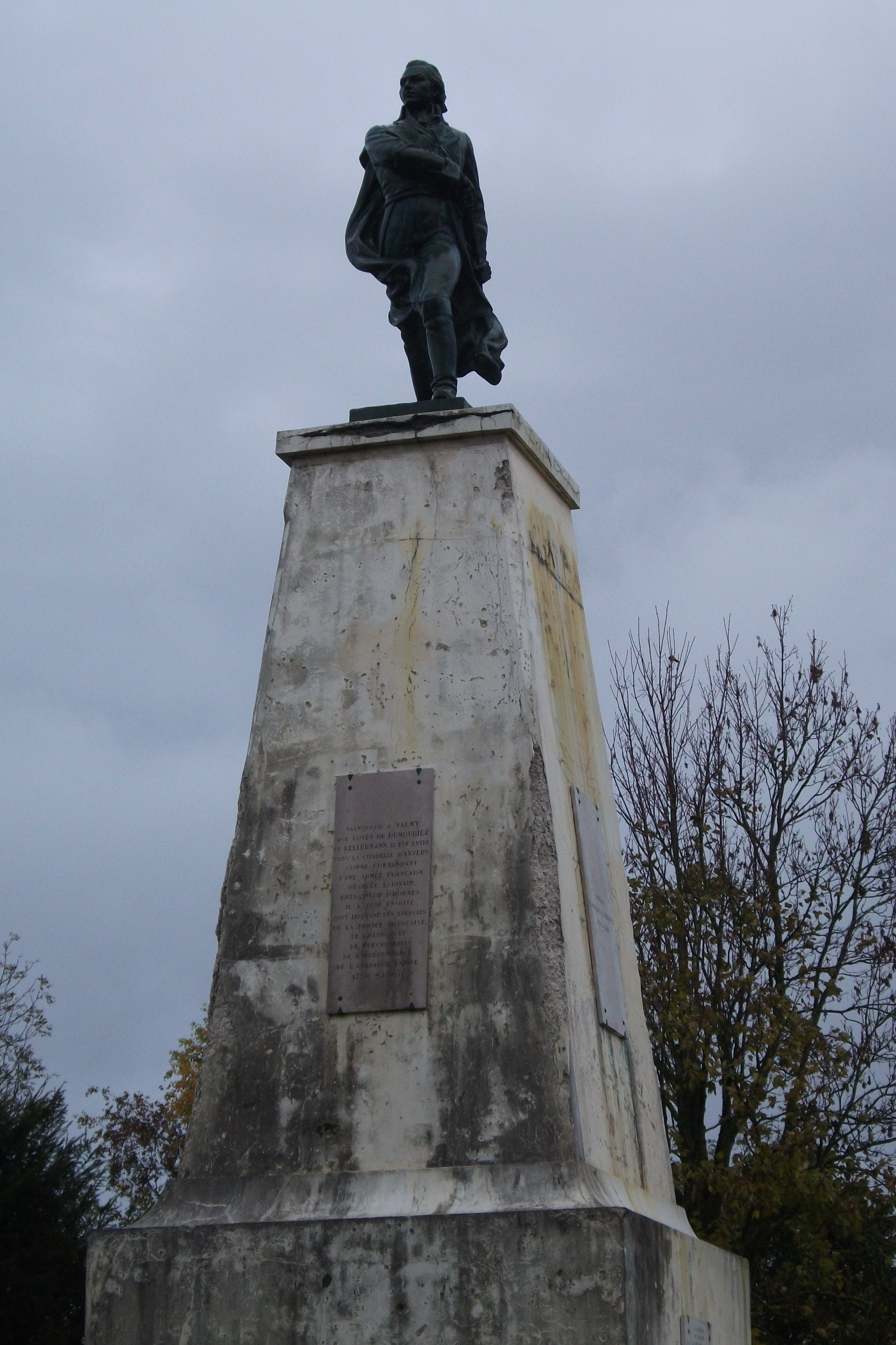
Statue of Francisco de Miranda at Valmy.

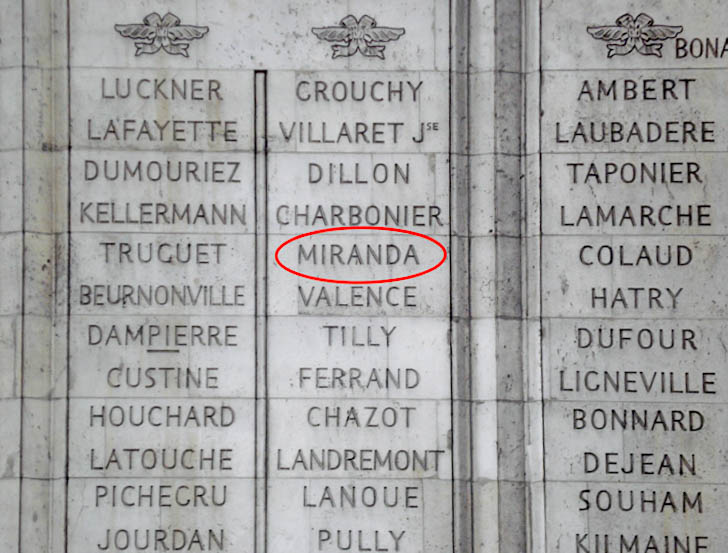
Miranda's name engraved on the Arc de Triomphe in Paris.

Francisco de Miranda (Caracas, 1750 – Cádiz, 1816), forerunner of Spanish American independence, is the figure who best symbolises the bond between France and Venezuela: a general of the French Revolution and, at the same time, the creator of the Venezuelan flag and a signatory of the Venezuelan declaration of independence.

=== In the French Revolution ===
He rose to the rank of général de division in the Army of the North in 1792 and fought at Valmy at the head of some two thousand soldiers under Dumouriez; brought before the Revolutionary Tribunal, he escaped the guillotine thanks to the defence of the lawyer Chauveau-Lagarde. He lived in Paris, in the Tuileries quarter, from where he spread republican ideals among his compatriots in Spanish America. Close to the Girondins, he became a suspect and had to take refuge in England. According to tradition, Napoleon said of him that "the sacred fire of the love of liberty" burned in his breast.

=== From republican ideals to Venezuelan independence ===
Taking advantage of the war between France and England, Miranda tried to relaunch the struggle for Venezuelan independence: the yellow, blue and red tricolour he designed was hoisted for the first time on 12 March 1806 aboard the brig Leander. The occupation of Spain by Napoleonic troops in 1808 opened the way to the autonomy of Caracas; Miranda signed the declaration of independence of 5 July 1811, received dictatorial powers in April 1812 and, after the armistice of San Mateo, was arrested; he died in a Spanish prison in Cádiz on 16 July 1816.

=== Shared memory ===
His name is engraved on the Arc de Triomphe among the generals of the Revolution and the Empire, his portrait hangs in the Museum of the History of France at the Palace of Versailles, and a statue of him stands at Valmy, facing that of General Kellermann. In Paris, a bronze statue of Miranda by Arturo Ruza presides over the group of Latin American figures in the square de l'Amérique-Latine (17th arrondissement). In Caracas, the Plaza Francia, inaugurated by President François Mitterrand on 9 October 1989, is bordered by the Francisco de Miranda avenue.

On the bicentenary of his death in 2016, the town hall of the 1st arrondissement of Paris hosted the exhibition Miranda – L'Amérique espagnole vue et rêvée from 14 to 24 June. That same month, the Venezuelan embassy in France paid tribute to him at the Arc de Triomphe by rekindling the flame of the Tomb of the Unknown Soldier; during the ceremony, French general Bruno Dary received the Order of Generalísimo Francisco de Miranda.

== Background ==
The history of Franco-Venezuelan relations dates back to the attacks by French pirates and privateers on the cities of the Venezuelan coast during the colonial period (1567, 1666, 1676, 1678, 1680). In 1543, French pirates reached the ruins of Nueva Cádiz, on Cubagua, where some ten inhabitants still remained, and set the town on fire, once again causing the island to be abandoned.

In 1678, the French fleet under Admiral d'Estrées was wrecked on the coral reefs of the Las Aves archipelago during a failed attempt to seize the Dutch island of Curaçao.

In 1783, the representative of King Charles III of Spain, José de Gálvez, applied the Cedula of Population to promote Catholic immigration to the province of Trinidad, then part of the Captaincy General of Venezuela. Most of those who answered the call were French planters who, with their slaves, developed sugar cane cultivation on the model of Saint-Domingue. In February 1797 Trinidad was occupied by the British, and part of the population of French origin began to move to Venezuela.

Franco-Venezuelan friendship has its roots in the participation of General Francisco de Miranda (see the dedicated section) in the French Revolution, where he distinguished himself at the Battle of Valmy (1792), the capture of Antwerp and the siege of Maastricht. Other milestones were the expedition of the French naturalist Aimé Bonpland to Venezuela (1799–1800) with Alexander von Humboldt and the stays of the hero of Venezuelan independence Simón Bolívar in Paris and Amiens between 1801 and 1806.

Equestrian statue of Simón Bolívar by Emmanuel Frémiet, Cours la Reine, next to the Pont Alexandre III, Paris.

The occupation of Spain by Napoleonic France gave the Venezuelan creoles the opportunity to break away from Madrid, with the creation of the Supreme Junta of Caracas in 1810.

French officers were numerous among the troops commanded by Miranda and Bolívar during the Venezuelan War of Independence, including Jean Rolichon, Colonel Joseph du Cayla, Lieutenant Colot, Colonel Rafael Chantillon, Colonel Manuel Serviez, naval captain Renato Beluche, the privateer Louis-Michel Aury, Luis Perú de Lacroix, Atanasio Girardot, Jean Lafitte, Prospero Révérend, Juan José Dauxión Lavaisse, Jean-Baptiste Bideau, Pierre Labatut, Augustin Gustave Villaret, Charles Eloi Demarquet and Henri La Fayette Villaume Ducoudray Holstein, among others.

In 1816, to help Simón Bolívar finance his expedition from Les Cayes in south-western Haiti, the businessman Benoît Chassériau formed a consortium in Port-au-Prince with Jean Pavageau, Michael Scott, George Robertson, S. Campbell and Maxwell Hyslop. Between 1822 and 1825 Chassériau was commercial agent of the French government in Gran Colombia, sent by Foreign Minister François-René de Chateaubriand.

In Paris, Francisco Antonio Zea, representative of the Colombian government in Europe, following the Liberator's instructions, engaged a French scientific mission on 1 May 1822 to establish a School of Mines, a mineralogical cabinet, the Museum of Natural History and other institutions. The mineralogist Mariano Eduardo de Rivero, head of the mission, and the chemist Jean-Baptiste Boussingault arrived at La Guaira on 22 November 1822, soon followed by the physician François Désiré Roulin, the entomologist Jacques Bourdon and the naturalist Justin-Marie Goudot.

General Mariano Montilla recommended the French physician Prospero Révérend to care for the Liberator on his arrival in Santa Marta on 1 December 1830. Révérend treated him without fees in the following days and was his last doctor; the 33 bulletins he wrote and the autopsy report are the only medical evidence of Bolívar's illness and death.

== History ==
=== 19th century ===
With the dissolution of Gran Colombia in 1830, France and the young Republic of Venezuela took their first steps in state-to-state relations. In 1833 a first bilateral convention was signed and a French consul was appointed in Caracas and La Guaira; in 1839 a treaty of friendship, commerce and navigation was signed.

General Rafael Urdaneta, former president of Colombia, fell ill in London while travelling in Europe as Venezuela's minister plenipotentiary; his condition worsened on his arrival in Paris, where he died on 23 August 1845, aged 56.

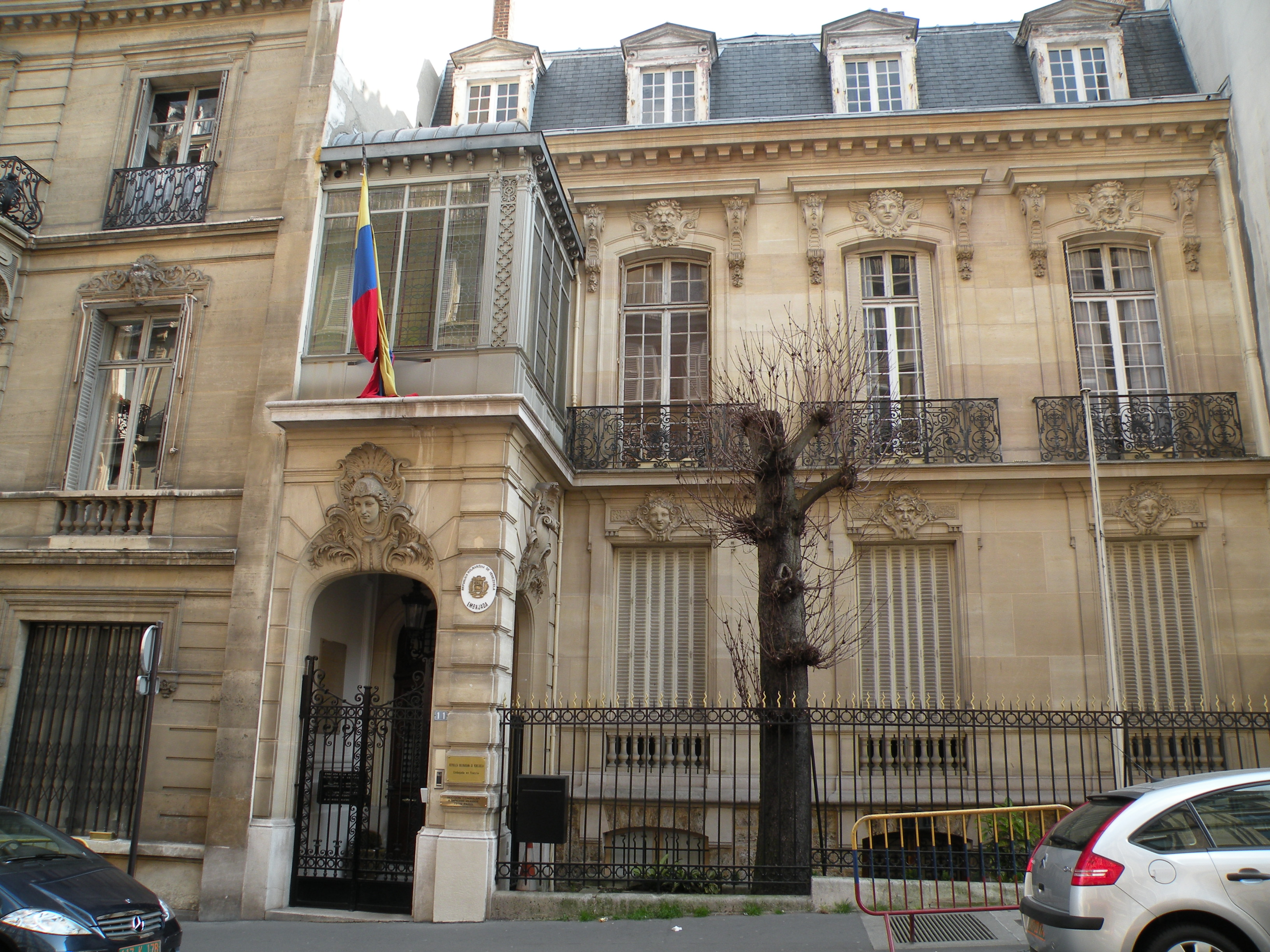
Embassy of Venezuela in Paris.

Among French explorers, besides Bonpland and Boussingault, Jean Chaffanjon stands out: commissioned by the French Ministry of Public Instruction in 1884, he made two journeys along the Orinoco, the first in 1884–1885 with the painter Auguste Morisot; on the second, in 1886, he believed he had reached the river's source. Jules Verne, who never visited the Orinoco basin, wrote The Mighty Orinoco drawing partly on Chaffanjon's works, which he mentions in the novel, as well as on Humboldt's.

During the first century of Venezuelan independence, relations alternated between rapprochement – especially under President Antonio Guzmán Blanco, a great admirer of the France of Napoleon III – and periods of tension over the debts of the Venezuelan state to French citizens and companies. These tensions twice led to the breaking off of diplomatic relations (1881–1885 and 1906–1913).

Antonio Guzmán Blanco (1829–1899) was the most "Francophile" of Venezuelan presidents. He stimulated the country's economic growth from 1870 to 1887, when he left for good for Paris, and sought to make Venezuela a "tropical France". One of his urban works was the first iron bridge in Caracas, the Puente de Hierro, linking the city centre to the south.

The Compañía Minera Nacional Anónima El Callao was founded in 1870 by the Corsican merchants Antonio Liccioni and Jean Cagninacci to mine gold in Bolívar State.

During this period, political instability led at least four Venezuelan presidents to seek French protection: José Tadeo Monagas (sheltered for a time in the French legation in Caracas), as well as Manuel Felipe de Tovar, Juan Crisóstomo Falcón and Antonio Guzmán Blanco (exiled in Paris). The last three died on French territory (Tovar and Guzmán in Paris, Falcón in Martinique).

Élie Théodore Delor, head of a mission of the Compagnie Générale Transatlantique, promoted with President Guzmán Blanco's approval a series of companies: the Société Agricole et Minière du Venezuela (1881), which obtained a contract for gas lighting in Caracas and several inland towns; and the Société Française des Houillères du Neverí, selected to build and operate the Naricual–Guanta railway, including the section from the port of Guanta to Barcelona.

The Gran Ferrocarril de La Ceiba was planned, built and run by the Corsican entrepreneurs Benito Roncayolo and his sons Juan and Andrés Roncayolo. The contract for the line from La Ceiba to Sabana de Mendoza was signed in Caracas on 17 March 1885 between engineer Jesús Muñoz Tébar, Minister of Public Works, and Benito Roncayolo. The section was completed on 31 December 1886 and opened to traffic on 20 January 1887.

In 1891 the government annulled the concession for the Gran Ferrocarril del Táchira between La Fría and El Brazo, granted in 1884 to Manuel Tejera. In 1892 the French Company of Venezuelan Railways began building the Gran Ferrocarril del Zulia between Santa Bárbara and El Vigía (60 km), whose main challenge was crossing the Chama River. On 31 December 1892 the government contracted Benito Roncayolo to build the Gran Ferrocarril del Táchira, financed by the Crédit Mobilier of Paris; the line opened on 5 July 1895 and was later extended to Encontrados, at the confluence of the Zulia and Catatumbo rivers, with the government receiving 5% of the profits.

In 1897, after the signing of the Treaty of Washington, Paris was chosen as the neutral seat of a tribunal to settle the dispute over the Essequibo territory between the United States of Venezuela and the British Empire, with three months to deliver an arbitral award.

On 3 October 1899, the tribunal sitting in Paris, in which American judges represented Venezuela, ruled unanimously in favour of the United Kingdom after sitting for only six consecutive days of the three months provided for by the Treaty of Washington. The award left Venezuela only the mouths of the Orinoco and part of the adjacent territory, while the United Kingdom obtained most of the territory west of the Essequibo River, whose border was later demarcated by a mixed British–Venezuelan commission.

In 1898, Victor Crassus Guillaume acquired the 54 km cocoa railway between Carenero and El Guapo, which operated until 1950, "since its precarious economic situation did not allow it to properly fulfil the function it was meant to serve".

In 1900 the French Company of Venezuelan Railways abandoned the operation of the Gran Ferrocarril del Zulia, much of the line having been damaged by the flooding of the Chama River.

=== 20th century ===
After the outbreak of the Liberating Revolution, employees of the French Cable Company were instructed to help the revolutionaries fighting to overthrow the government of Cipriano Castro; official telegrams sent via the French cable were retransmitted in code to the Caracas offices, which became the information centre on government troop movements.

In 1903, fleeing the French law of 1 July 1901 on associations, which outlawed religious congregations, a group of priests of the French community of the Sons of Mary Immaculate arrived in Venezuela and founded the Colegio Francés in Caracas at the end of that year. Plaza Altamira was renamed Plaza Francia under an agreement between Caracas and Paris to have a Plaza Francia in Caracas and a Place du Venezuela in Paris.

In 1908 the Corsican community of Paria was exiled to Trinidad by President Cipriano Castro over the alleged manipulation of information transmitted through the French Cable Company, headquartered in Carúpano. After the fall of Castro's regime in December 1908, President Juan Vicente Gómez decreed a general amnesty and the exiled Corsicans began to return in 1909.

Diplomatic relations were restored in 1913 with the signing of the Franco-Venezuelan Protocol, which provided for the progressive payment of the external debt and compensation for the interruption of the French cable service. At that time France was the second destination of Venezuelan exports after the United States, and its fourth supplier after the United States, the United Kingdom and Germany.

At the start of the First World War, Venezuela remained neutral. In August 1914 the Gómez government, accused of Germanophilia, proposed through its foreign ministry a World Congress of Neutrals, without success. In 1915, despite the escalation of the conflict, payments of French claims were accelerated.

The metal components of the suspension bridges over the Guárico and Torbes rivers were designed and built by the French firm Gaston Leinekugel Le Cocq et Fils, of the hydrographic engineer Gaston Leinekugel (1867–1965). The "Juan Vicente Gómez" bridge (or El Sombrero bridge), 213 m long, was built between 1927 and 1930 and inaugurated on 6 May 1930 for the centenary of Bolívar's death; the "Libertador" bridge over the Torbes, 200 m long, built between 1928 and 1930, was inaugurated on 17 December 1930.

In 1939, the team of French urban planners Henri Prost, Jacques Lambert and Maurice Rotival proposed a monumental plan for Caracas structured around Avenida Simón Bolívar, which was never carried out.

In 1953 the Franco-Venezuelan Expedition, led by Major Frank Rísquez Irribarren (1915–1969), reached the sources of the Orinoco in the Sierra Parima on the Brazilian border; Professor Joseph Grelier and his colleagues collected minerals and biological specimens.

The first commercial Concorde flight from Paris arrived in Venezuela on 9 April 1976, landing at Maiquetía after covering the 7,167 km route in six hours with a stopover in the Azores; a first special flight had taken place on 12 February 1976. Air France operated the Concorde on a regular basis until 1983.

The French consortium led by Maurice Cancelonni's Société générale de techniques et d'études (SGTE) won the tender for the construction of the Caracas Metro in May 1978; the Compagnie industrielle de matériel de transport (CIMT) and Alsthom-Atlantique supplied the rolling stock, while Cerci, a subsidiary of Jeumont-Schneider, supplied the real-time automation systems. On 2 January 1983 President Luis Herrera Campins inaugurated the first section of Line 1 to mark the bicentenary of the Liberator.

During the 1992 Venezuelan coup d'état attempts led by Hugo Chávez, the French government "immediately signalled its refusal to accept a breakdown in institutional legitimacy". Several Latin American countries, including Venezuela, have been accused of sheltering members of the terrorist organisation ETA wanted in Spain and France, Canada and the United States being the only American countries to list the organisation as terrorist.

=== 21st century ===
In the context of the Venezuelan presidential crisis, French President Emmanuel Macron called the 2018 Venezuelan presidential election "illegitimate" and, on 26 January 2019, announced that without elections within eight days France would be ready to recognise Juan Guaidó as "President in charge". On 4 February 2019 he announced that France recognised Guaidó as "President in charge" to implement an electoral process.

After the presidential election of 28 July 2024, the European Union, of which France is a member, declared on 29 August that it did not recognise the democratic legitimacy of Nicolás Maduro, without formally recognising Edmundo González Urrutia as the winner either.

In June 2025, the French-Chilean citizen Camilo Castro disappeared after crossing the Colombia–Venezuela border at Paraguachón and was held in Venezuela for more than four months; he was released through French diplomatic efforts and arrived in Paris on 16 November 2025.

In December 2025, France's deputy permanent representative to the United Nations Security Council, Jay Dharmadhikari, stressed the importance of respecting international law in the fight against drug trafficking amid rising tensions between the United States and Venezuela.

After the capture of Maduro by the United States in early January 2026, Foreign Minister Jean-Noël Barrot stated that the operation breached the principle of the non-use of force, while Macron welcomed that the Venezuelan people had been rid "of the dictatorship". On 5 January, government spokesperson Maud Bregeon specified that France "neither supported nor approved" the method used and that, in the event of a transition, the winner of the 2024 election should play a central role.

On 2 June 2026, the Venezuelan National Assembly approved, at the request of acting president Delcy Rodríguez, the appointment of the historian Samuel Moncada as ambassador to France, also accredited to Andorra and Monaco.

After the two earthquakes that struck Venezuela on 24 June 2026, France deployed 85 rescue workers, who carried out search and clearance operations until 4 July, and sent 44 tonnes of humanitarian aid from the French Antilles with the French Red Cross and the support of the French Armed Forces in the Antilles. The earthquakes damaged the premises of the French embassy in Las Mercedes (Caracas), whose consular services were temporarily moved to the Colegio Francia in La Carlota; visa processing, suspended since 21 September, resumed on 20 October 2026.

== State visits ==
Route of Charles de Gaulle's tour of South America (21 September – 16 October 1964), which began in Venezuela.

Venezuela was the first stop of President Charles de Gaulle's 32,000 km tour of South America, from 21 September to 16 October 1964. Replying to the welcome speech by Venezuelan President Raúl Leoni at Maiquetía, he declared: "For the first time in history, a French head of state is officially visiting South America". He drove through Caracas in an open car and addressed the Congress, recalling Francisco de Miranda, whose name is on the Arc de Triomphe; he exchanged decorations with his counterpart, receiving the Order of the Liberator, and continued to Colombia on the afternoon of 22 September. According to the special edition of the ORTF television news of 18 October 1964, Venezuelan fighter jets escorted his Caravelle over the Caribbean coast; he addressed the two hundred Venezuelan parliamentarians and told Raúl Leoni that both countries agreed that "all oppression and all hegemony" should be banished; he also visited a hospital run by a French nun of the Saint Vincent de Paul order in a working-class district of Caracas.

President François Mitterrand's Latin American tour began in Venezuela on 4 October 1989; bilateral agreements were signed in Caracas on drug control, technical assistance in customs and tax administration, technology transfer and joint ventures in several industries, and investment opportunities in oil, petrochemicals, gas and nickel. On 20 March 1998 Venezuelan President Rafael Caldera was received by Jacques Chirac at the Élysée Palace and by Prime Minister Lionel Jospin at the Hôtel Matignon; the same day the Sorbonne awarded him an honorary doctorate, where he set out his concept of international social justice.

President Hugo Chávez met President Jacques Chirac in October 2002, March 2005 and October 2005.

In November 2007, Chávez visited President Nicolas Sarkozy to discuss the situation of the French-Colombian hostage Íngrid Betancourt.

In September 2008, Chávez visited Sarkozy again and said he sought help from "friendly" countries like France in exchange for "Venezuelan energy".

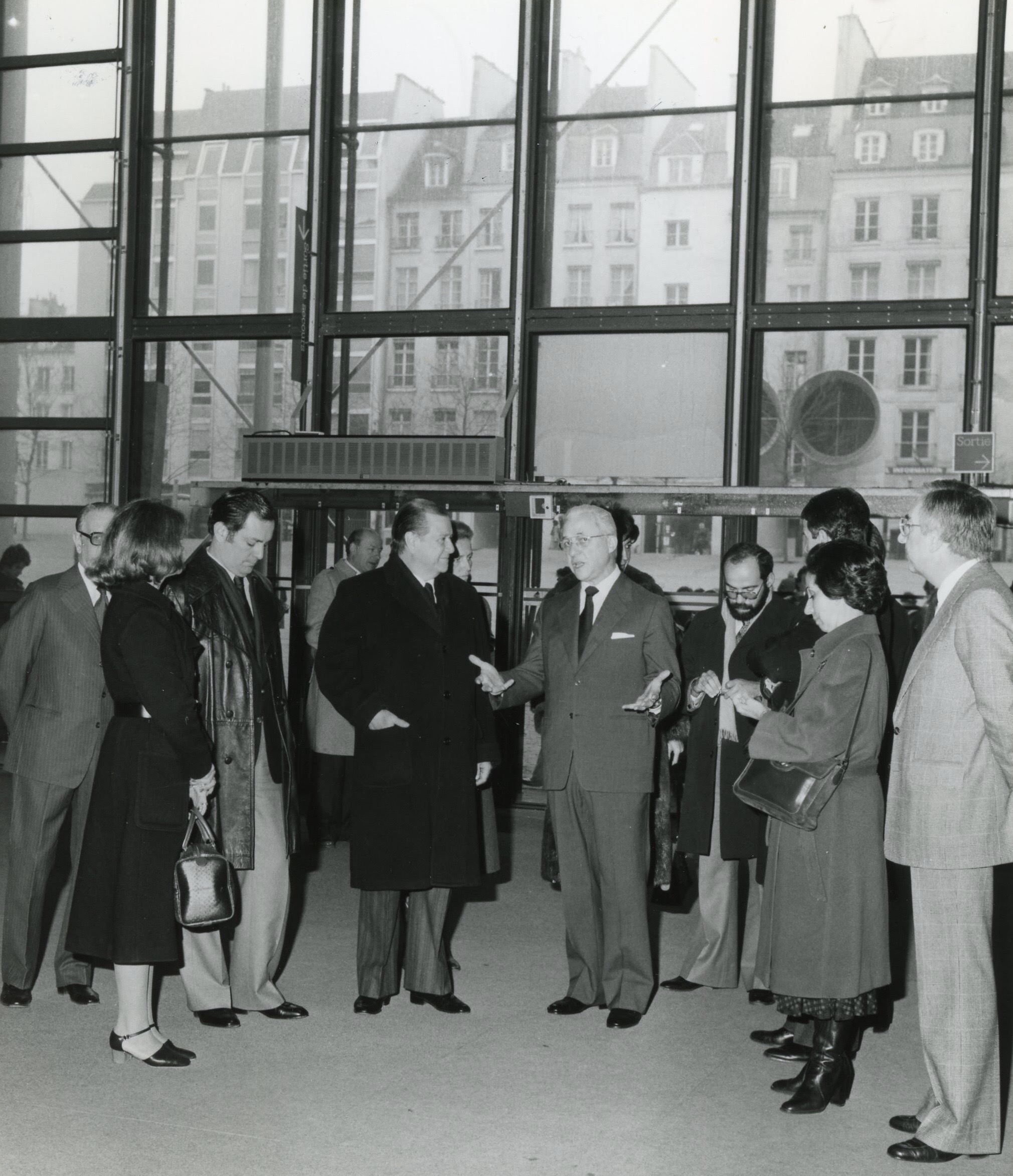
Former Venezuelan President Rafael Caldera at the Centre Pompidou in Paris, 1980.

== Agreements and cultural and scientific cooperation ==
In October 2008, the foreign ministers of Venezuela and France signed ten cooperation agreements covering energy, defence, telecommunications, tourism and the fight against drug trafficking.

In November 2012 a cooperation agreement between the French Institut de recherche pour le développement (IRD) and the Venezuelan Institute for Scientific Research (IVIC) came into force. In May 2018 the "Marcel Roche Network" for university and scientific cooperation was signed, bringing together six French universities and schools and five Venezuelan universities in political science, computer engineering, nanoscience, petroleum, architecture and urban planning.

Venezuela is home to the Lycée Français de Caracas, as well as a network of Alliances Françaises; French cinema, gastronomy and Francophonie festivals are also held.

A positive view of the Venezuelan political regime prevails in some circles of the French left.

== French investment ==
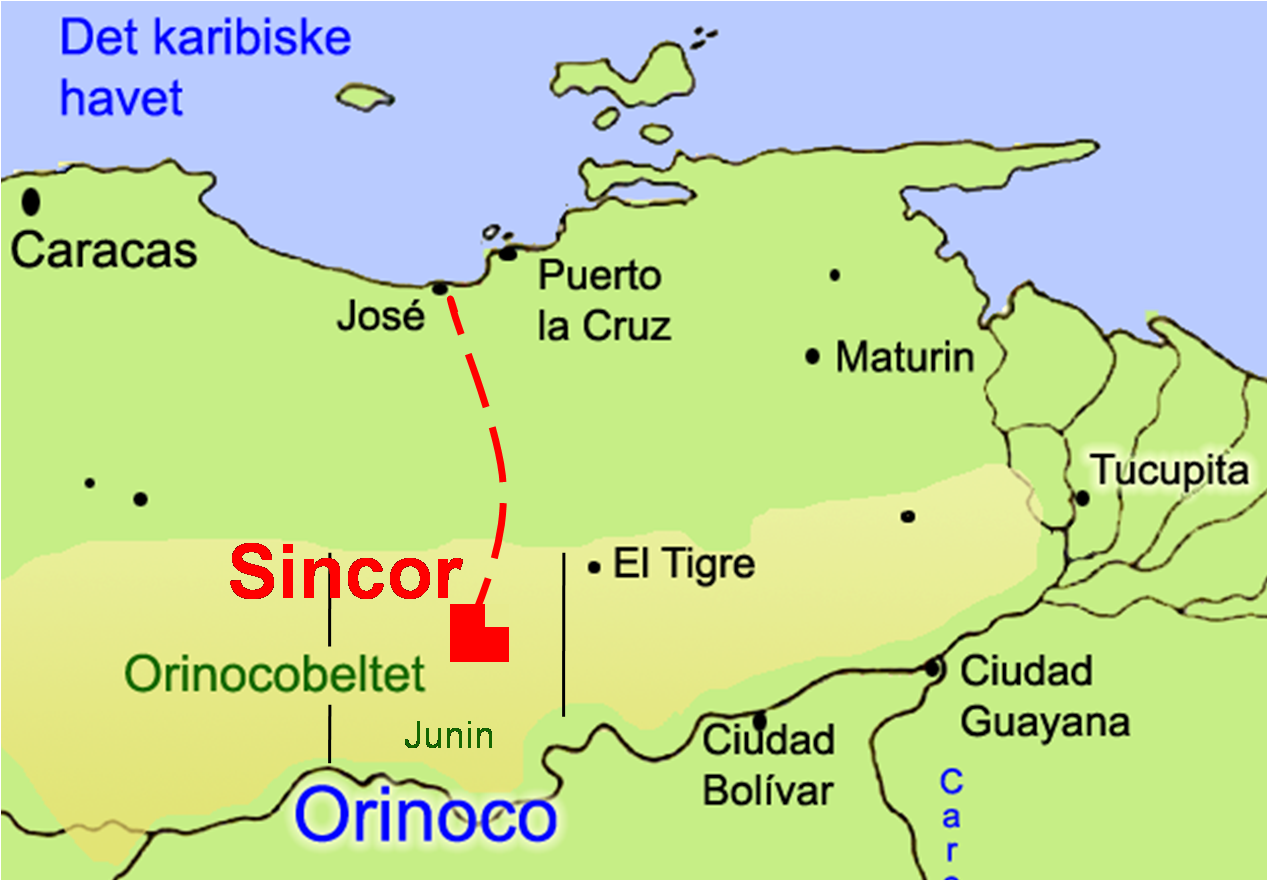
Map of the Sincor project, in which Total took part.

The French oil company Total has been present in Venezuela since 1950. Renault produced some 132,000 vehicles in Venezuela between 1963 and 1993.

The Compañía Minera Nacional Anónima El Callao was founded in 1870 by the Corsican merchants Antonio Liccioni and Jean Cagninacci to mine gold in Bolívar State.

The Gran Ferrocarril de La Ceiba was planned, built and run by the Corsican entrepreneurs Benito Roncayolo and his sons Juan and Andrés; the La Ceiba–Sabana de Mendoza section was completed on 31 December 1886 and opened to traffic on 20 January 1887.

On 15 June 1889 the railway from Barcelona to the Naricual mines entered service. The initial contract, held by the Société Civile de Côte Ferme as successor to the Société Française des Houillères du Neverí, provided for several sections, including the port of Guanta–Barcelona (18.7 km) and Barcelona–Naricual (12 km).

On 3 July 1929 the Venezuelan government granted the Compagnie générale aéropostale a concession to operate in Venezuela. In 1933 its shares were bought by the Venezuelan state, which created the Línea Aeropostal Venezolana (LAV); the fleet of Latécoère 26 and 28 aircraft was replaced by Fairchild 82Bs, with the first flights linking Maracay with Maracaibo and Ciudad Bolívar.

In 2000, the French company Pechiney signed an agreement with the Venezuelan government to invest US$260 million over three years to expand bauxite extraction at the Los Pijiguaos mine and alumina production in the state-owned Matanzas industrial zone.

As of 2005, Total was the largest foreign investor in Venezuela. That year it began negotiations with the Venezuelan government over a possible US$5 billion project to develop heavy oil in eastern Venezuela. In April 2006 the government took control of foreign-owned oil fields, including those operated by Total, which was later compensated for the Sincor project. In February 2019, after the United States imposed sanctions, Total evacuated its staff from Venezuela.

In December 2018, the French oil company Maurel & Prom bought from Shell, for €70 million, 40% of the joint venture Petroregional del Lago, which operates the Urdaneta Oeste field in Lake Maracaibo with PDVSA. In November 2023, after the temporary easing of US sanctions, PDVSA and Maurel & Prom signed an agreement to revive the joint venture's oil and gas production, PDVSA's first agreement with a European oil company since that easing. The company obtained a specific US licence in May 2024, revoked in March 2025, and in February 2026 was included in General License 50A, authorising it to operate with the Venezuelan state and PDVSA; in January 2026 the field produced about 21,000 barrels per day, of which 8,400 net for Maurel & Prom's subsidiary.

Economic relations between the two countries have been marked by nationalisations and by the political instability affecting Venezuela since 2016. Although the two countries concluded an agreement on the reciprocal promotion and protection of investments, Venezuela withdrew from the International Centre for Settlement of Investment Disputes in 2012.

== Trade ==
Venezuelan criollo cocoa, a small share of world production, is prized by high-end French chocolate makers. The French company Valrhona has worked with Venezuelan cocoa since the 1990s and in 2016 signed a ten-year partnership with the Cacao San José plantation in Carúpano (Sucre State), including 25 years of exclusivity on the varieties developed jointly.

Venezuelan rum, protected by the "Ron de Venezuela" appellation of origin, is sold in France: Diplomático launched in 2020 an edition reserved for the French market, where the brand had been present for about ten years, and Santa Teresa presented in 2023 a limited edition of its 1796 rum for that market.

== Counter-narcotics cooperation ==
In October 2026, the French Navy and the Venezuelan National Guard carried out a joint operation in the Caribbean Sea: detected by a French frigate, a Venezuelan-registered fishing boat was boarded under Article 17 of the Vienna Convention against illicit traffic in narcotic drugs, with the participation of the National Guard's UEA-45 La Guaira anti-drug unit and the coast guard of the Bolivarian Navy. Nearly 2,900 kg of drugs (1,173.5 kg of cocaine and 1,727.4 kg of cannabis) were seized and four people were arrested and handed over to the Venezuelan judiciary. The French Armed Forces in the Antilles confirmed the handover of the crew, drugs and boat to the Venezuelan authorities, while Venezuelan Deputy Foreign Minister Oliver Blanco thanked France for its cooperation and stressed that the operation was conducted in accordance with international law.

== See also ==
- Foreign relations of France
- Foreign relations of Venezuela
- Romain Nadal
