= Battle of Cartagena =

Battle of Cartagena may refer to different historical military engagements:

== In Cartagena, Spain ==
- Battle of Cartagena (209 BC), a Roman attack during the Second Punic War
- Battle of Cartagena (206 BC), a Carthaginian attack during the same war
- Battle of Cartagena (461), a naval battle between Vandals and Romans near the end of the Western Roman Empire
- Battle of Cartagena (1643), a naval battle between France and Spain during the War of the Pyrenees
- Battle of Cartagena (1758), a naval battle between Britain and France during the Seven Years' War
- Battle of Cartagena (1798), a naval battle between Britain and Spain during the Anglo-Spanish War of 1796–1802
- Siege of Cartagena (1873-1874) during the Cantonal Rebellion
  - Battle of Portmán (1873), a naval battle during the siege sometimes referred to as the "Battle off Cartagena"
- Battle of Cartagena (1939), a naval mutiny during the Spanish Civil War

== In Cartagena, Colombia ==
- Battle of Cartagena de Indias (1586), an English naval attack during the Anglo-Spanish War of 1585–1604
- Raid on Cartagena (1683), an attack by the Dutch pirate Laurens de Graaf
- Raid on Cartagena de Indias (1697), a French naval attack during the War of the Grand Alliance
- Battle of Cartagena de Indias (1741), a British naval attack during the War of Jenkins' Ear
- New Granadan siege of Cartagena (1815) during the New Granada Civil War
- Siege of Cartagena (1815), a Spanish siege during the Colombian Independence War
- Siege of Cartagena (1820–21), a Gran Colombian siege during the Colombian Independence War
