= Provincia de Padilla =

The Padilla Province was one of the first born sovereign states of Magdalena (Colombia). It was created by the law of 21 November 1857, which segregated the province Riohacha and transformed it into a department in 1864. The first city was Riohacha.

It belonged to the sovereign state of Riohacha and possessed a growing economy in addition to carrying out an important role in the radical liberalism of the country at the end of the 19th century.

== Toponymy ==
The name belongs to admiral Jose Prudencio Padilla, the native leader of the independence movement when he was known as Rio del Hacha in the XVIII century. The province changed its name in 1858.

== History ==
The province of Rio del Hacha was founded under the Spanish colonial authority in the middle of the XVIII century, it was known as Riohacha in the 19th century and formed a part of grand Colombia. Before Simon Bolivar died, he made sure unity existed between the provinces that created the first republic;
