= Siege of Cartagena (1820–21) =

Part of the Colombian War of Independence

- Part of the Colombian War of Independence
Date	14 July 1820 – 10 October 1821 (15 months)
Location	Cartagena de Indias, Viceroyalty of New Granada 10°24′N 75°30′W
Result	Gran Colombian victory

Belligerents
Gran Colombia	Kingdom of Spain

Commanders and leaders
Mariano Montilla; José Prudencio Padilla; José María Córdova; Hermógenes Maza	Gabriel de Torres (surrendered); Juan de Sámano; Francisco Warleta (surrendered)

Strength
2,500 –3,000	1,150 –2,000

Casualties and losses
Unknown	700 survivors surrender and are sent to Cuba

The siege of Cartagena (1820–1821) (Spanish: Asedio de Cartagena de Indias (1820–1821)) was a military confrontation fought in the context of the Colombian War of Independence between Patriots and Royalists, with the victory of the former. It was the longest siege experienced by the city in its history.

== Background ==
The United Provinces of New Granada had declared its independence from Spain in 1811, and by 1815 controlled large parts of present-day Colombia. But in 1815, after the defeat of Napoleon, the restored King Ferdinand VII of Spain had sent a large fleet under command of Pablo Morillo to restore order in the colonies and destroy the Republic.

Pablo Morillo and his veteran troops besieged and starved into submission the city of Cartagena de Indias between 26 August and 6 December 1815.

But in 1819, Simón Bolívar launched his campaign to liberate New Granada and inflicted a crushing defeat on the Royalists at the Battle of Boyacá. After the victory of Boyacá, the army of Bolívar advanced along the Magdalena River from Santafé de Bogotá towards the Colombian Caribbean, seizing several strongholds until only Cartagena was left in Royalist hands, with a solidly entrenched garrison.

== Siege ==
The siege began on 14 July 1820, when the Venezuelan colonel Mariano Montilla surrounded the city. The garrison was led by the Spanish governor and brigadier, Gabriel Ceferino de Torres y Velasco. Also present were Viceroy of New Granada Juan de Sámano and colonel Francisco de Paula Warleta y Franco. The Spanish were still connected by sea and were supported by the surrounding towns, so there were initially no problems when it came to access to supplies. The fleet of Patriot Admiral José Prudencio Padilla was required, but it was occupied conquering Riohacha and Santa Marta.

In the meantime, the divisions commanded by Córdova and Maza arrived to reinforce the pressure on the Royalists, after their victories and pacification of Antioquia and Magdalena, and with the mission of preventing the Royalists from supplying themselves with food and supplies from Corozal. Brigadier Torres y Velasco now wanted to negotiate, but Montilla rejected the request to meet with him. Torres later wrote to Bolívar, but he also refused to talk.

In January 1821, Padilla's fleet arrived at Cartagena, blocking the port with 40 ships. On 24 June 1821 at night, Padilla assaulted the Royalist in Ánimas Bay, near the current Los Pegasos dock, capturing 11 enemy ships and their weapons. After this, the fate of the garrison was sealed. Viceroy Sámano managed to escape by sea to Panama, which would remain in Spanish hands until November. Torres y Velasco was forced to capitulate to General Montilla on 10 October, bringing the last Royalist fortress in the Colombian Caribbean definitively under Patriot control.

Torres y Velasco and his troops were sent to Cuba, where Torres y Velasco was tried and acquitted for losing the city.

== Sources ==
- Marley, David (2005). Historic Cities of the Americas: The Caribbean, Mexico and Central America. Santa Bárbara: ABC-CLIO. ISBN 978-1-57607-027-7.
- Restrepo, Juan Manuel (1858). Historia de la revolución de la República de Colombia en la América Meridional. Tomo III. Besanzon: Imprenta de José Jacquin.
- Mitre, Bartolomé (2003). The Emancipation of South America. A condensed translation of History of San Martin by General Don Bartolomé Mitre. Translated to English by William Pilling. Buenos Aires: Stockcero. ISBN 978-9-87205-060-3.
- Viloria de la Hoz, Joaquín (2005). "De la Patria Boba a la Gran Colombia". En Federico Tomás Adlercreutz, 1793-1852: vicisitudes militares, económicas y sociales de un conde sueco en América. Comité de Publicaciones de la Facultad de Administración de la Universidad de Los Andes. ISSN 0121-7062.
- Henao, Jesús María & Gerardo Arrubla (1920). Historia de Colombia para la enseñanza secundaria. Tomo II. Bogotá: Librería Colombiana.
- Galvis Madero, Luis (1970). La Gran Colombia, 1819–1830. Lerner.
- Cartagena Explorer: The Siege of Cartagena – La Heroica Bravely Resists the Spanish Reconquest
- Córdova : gloria y asesinato del héroe. Tomo I / Armando Barona Mesa; prólogo del académico Antonio Cacua Prada
- Palacios, Marcos & Frank Safford (2002). Colombia: país fragmentado, sociedad dividida: su historia. Bogotá: Norma. ISBN 978-9-58046-509-6.

== Links ==
- Cartagena es liberada
- Cartagena Explorer
