= Henri La Fayette Villaume Ducoudray Holstein =

Henri Louis La Fayette Villaume Ducoudray Holstein (born Heinrich Ludwig Villaume, 23 September 1772 in Schwedt/Oder, Uckermark, Brandenburg, Prussia – 23 April 1839 in Albany, New York) was a soldier in France, Colombia and Venezuela, and an author in the United States.

== Biography ==
Decoudray Holstein was an officer in the French Army under Napoleon and was taken prisoner in Cádiz, Spain. In 1813 Ducoudray Holstein departed for Philadelphia, Pennsylvania but was denied entry in the U.S. Army. In 1814 he arrived at Cartagena de Indias, where he joined Simón Bolívar and was appointed officer in the army. With the grade of colonel he was an eye witness of the crucial revolutionary years 1814-1816.

In Cartagena he was first in the Corsairs of French privateer Louis Aury, with whom he maintained a friendship, and later at militia corps of General Manuel del Castillo y Rada, who just fought the royalists of Santa Marta during the liberation wars on the Río Magdalena. When a government crisis arose in January 1815 as a result of several coups in a short period of time, Villaume stood at the side of Castillo y Rada, who ended the political instability militarily. Here he married the neogranadine María del Carmen.

When general Pablo Morillo lay siege to Cartagena from late August to early December 1815, he served as General defending the fortress Boca Chica on the island of Tierra Bomba in the harbor entrance. The day before the surrender, he fled to Haiti with the Venezuelan officers of Bolivar on the ship of his friend, the naval commander of Cartagena, Louis Aury.

He met the Liberator Simón Bolívar in January 1816 in Port Au Prince and joined him. Holstein took part in Les Cayes Expedition to liberate Venezuela from Spanish rule.Villaume took part in the landing on Margarita island in May and the installation of Bolívar as commander-in-chief there. Despite the surprising taking of Carúpano by the vanguard of Bolivar, he saw clearly ahead of the forthcoming retreat of Ocumare de la Costa and left on 23 June, the army of Bolivar. He embarked again to Haiti where disappointed with the womanizing and totalitarian behavior of Simón Bolívar "in his eyes" who has repeatedly fled during engagements against the Spanish enemy, Ducoudray Holstein resigned in 1816, left Bolívar army and moved to Aux Cayes, Haiti in order to get by there as a bookseller and music teacher.

In 1822, Ducoudray Holstein conceived, carefully planned, organized and directed a for-profit commercial enterprise seeking to invade the Spanish colony of Puerto Rico and declare it the independent “Republica Boricua.”

His experience with Bolívar and with the independence wars in Venezuela are described in Holstein, Henri Louis Ducoudray (12 January 2011). Memoirs of Simón Bolívar. CreateSpace Independent Publishing Platform. ISBN 978-1456545116.

He later moved to the United States, settling in Albany, New York, where he became a language teacher and editor of The Zodiac.

== Family ==
He married Maria del Carmen (c. 1800 Colombia - 1 May 1855 Albany, New York); they had son Lafayette Ducoudray Holstein (1 August 1826 New York - 7 April 1864).

== Works ==
- Recollections of an Officer of the Empire
- Henri La Fayette Villaume Ducoudray Holstein (1824). Memoirs of Gilbert Motier La Fayette. Charles Wiley. "Henri La Fayette Villaume Ducoudray Holstein."
- Henri La Fayette Villaume Ducoudray Holstein (1829). Memoirs of Simon Bolivar and his principlal generals. S. G. Goodrich.
- Henri La Fayette Villaume Ducoudray Holstein (1833). Le Glaneur Francais. Russell Robbins. p. 240. "maubourg."

== See also ==
- Ducoudray Holstein Expedition
