= Ducoudray Holstein Expedition =

Attempt by commercial interests to invade Puerto Rico

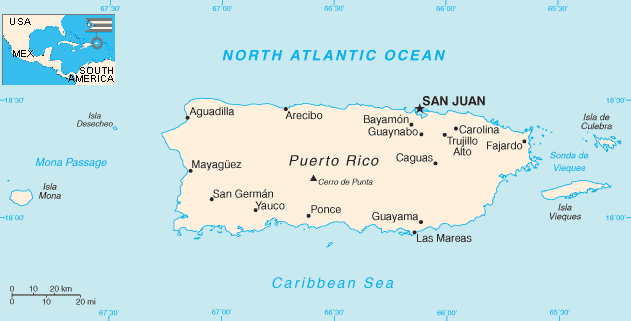
- Map of Puerto Rico
- Operational scope: Puerto Rico
- Type: Amphibious Invasion, overthrow of colonial government.
- Location: Puerto Rico
- Planned: early 1820s
- Planned by: Henri La Fayette Villaume Ducoudray Holstein
- Objective: Removal of Spanish forces from Puerto Rico, and declaring the Boricua Republic
- Date: 1822
- Outcome: Eventual cancellation

The Ducoudray Holstein Expedition was an attempt by commercial interests to invade Puerto Rico, and declare it the independent "Republica Boricua" in 1822.

In the 1820s there was a plot to invade Puerto Rico, declare its independence from Spain, proclaim the Republica Boricua and establish its capital in Mayagüez. This invasion was different from all its precursors since none before had intended to make Puerto Rico an independent nation, and use the Taino name Boricua as the name of the republic. It was also intended more as a mercantile venture than a patriotic endeavor. It was the first time an invasion intended to make the city of Mayagüez the capital of the island.

The enterprise was conceived and carefully planned, organized and directed as a for-profit commercial enterprise by general Henri La Fayette Villaume Ducoudray Holstein, a Germano-French veteran of the Napoleonic Wars and the Spanish American wars of independence.

== Background ==
In 1819, Ducoudray Holstein moved to Curaçao, there he began socializing with wealthy French foreigners living in western Puerto Rico that conducted business with Curaçao. These foreigners resented the restrictions on commerce and sea transportation by the Spanish Authorities on the island as a consequence to the insurgent activities of Simon Bolivar in Venezuela. They courted Ducoudray because of his military experience, with the intention of making him interested in leading an armed movement to invade Puerto Rico to convert the island into a republic. For this thus group of foreigners would give him support in any way possible and they counted on a simultaneous general rebellion organized by them amongst the black slaves of the island. Even though they counted on the help of the slaves, the political program of the República Boricua, inspired on European Republican Ideals, it did not include the emancipation of the slaves.

While Ducoudray Holstein was in Curaçao he was visited by numerous men including: A. Mattei ("Matthey"), a businessman of French origin with connections in Puerto Rico, George Curiel a Jewish businessman established beforehand in Saint Thomas who in 1819 would return to his native Curaçao, a sailor whose surname was Bouyet, believed to be Juan Bautista Buyé, a contrabandist of French origin and a collaborator of Roberto Cofresí (a beach in Cabo Rojo bears his name). Ducoudray also socialized with a lawyer from the United States called Baptiste Irvine, and editor for the New York Columbian, who would later be a diplomatic agent of the US in Chile. Irvine maintained contacts in Curaçao with Marcow, one of the Marcovich brothers and immigrant sailors from Ragusa, Yugoslavia, who also resided in Curaçao.

On March 1, 1822 Ducoudray moved from Curaçao to Saint Tomas, where he had been before, and on April 6, 1822 he obtained there a passport to Puerto Rico. On April 20, 1822 the Curacayian Francis de Chelo informed the mayor of Aguadilla, don Juan Martínez de Acevedo, about a conspiracy of insurgent corsairs that were organizing in the Venezuelan port of La Guaira, that was composed of three mayor ships and four "flecheras". Each one of those ships would transport three hundred men for disembarking, furthermore the ones that would be brought in the "flecheras" to take the ports of Ponce and Aguada. Afterward on May 18, 1822 the mayor of Aguadilla informed everything to Coronel don José Navarro, Superior Political Chief, "Intendente General" and Interim Governor of the island.

== Preparations ==
Ducoudray Holstein's expedition found economic support in Fajardo, Naguabo, Guayama, Mayagüez and Hormigueros, in Puerto Rico, and in Philadelphia, Boston, Baltimore and New York City. He also found a group of experienced officers, and troops ready in an instant to begin the invasion. The Ducoudray Holstein expedition obtained financial support from influential people through wealthy foreigners in Puerto Rico, and other influential sectors in the United States. The expedition was expensive, but the support he received was plentiful. Included were a number of large well-armed ships, whose owners knew the risk that ran their ships taking part in this bellicose endeavor. The troops were mercenary forces whose officers where French.

In the course of these efforts Ducoudray and his family moved to San Tómas in the Danish Virgin Islands. From there Ducoudray traveled to Philadelphia in the United States where he found much support and hired several ships. On August 10, 1822, don Juan Leamy, the Spanish Vice-Consul in Philadelphia, reported that a Frenchman surnamed "Wischaur" was recruiting 200 men for an expedition. The secret agent in Puerto Rico for the expedition was Peter Dubois, a mulatto, native from Guadeloupe, living in Daguao, a barrio of Naguabo. In Philadelphia, Ducoudray and Irvine, alongside forty other persons leased a brig, the "Mary", for $20,000 from its owner Thomas Wattson, who knew the purpose of the expedition. The Mary was armed with two cannons. They also leased a Dutch brig, the Eendracht. They acquired numerous rifles, pistols, cartridges, gunpowder and other munitions of war, a cargo of flour and left Philadelphia en route to the Antilles in August 1822. A boat from Baltimore and one from New York will also join them on the high seas.

Three neighbors from Fajardo appeared on September 13, 1822 before Don Francisco González de Linares, first Civil Governor of Puerto Rico, to inform him that they had discovered the existence of a revolutionary movement for the independence of the island, this movement had support abroad and had many followers on the island, among whom was a resident Frenchman from Fajardo called don Pedro Dubois; Derzá, a Dutchman from Guayama and José Vicente Roman, a Saint Tomas resident of Puerto Rico since 1811. After June 26, 1821 when an insurgent squadron led by a such Villanueva had appeared in view of the port of Mayagüez intending to seize the port battery and set fire to the city, all of Puerto Rico remained on alert. On that occasion the insurgents were rejected by the neighbors of Mayagüez. The military Department of Western Puerto Rico (which covered from Aguadilla to Guayanilla), the Spanish army had 29 individuals assigned to Mayaguez and Aguadilla forts, but it was obvious that such defenses were completely inadequate. By 1822, in the neighboring Danish island of San Tomas there were heightened rumors of an invasion to Puerto Rico, island in which fields and coasts were being carefully monitored in order to avoid the formation and organization of expeditionary groups that could launch an attack against it.

Under instructions, seven hundred citizens of France and Germany, under the orders of the Ducoudray Holstein had departed from Boston, headed to the island of San Tomas with nine schooners to form an expedition against Puerto Rico. The Ducoudray expedition arrived on September 16, 1822, at the Swedish island of Saint Barthélemy (France gave the island to Sweden in 1784) and there it left the Selina and the Andrew Jackson, vessels which were part of the expedition. Ducoudray wanted to go first to La Guaira in two boats to find Colombian reinforcements, but it was not necessary to bring these. Meanwhile, Simon Bolivar launched his first call for a congress to meet representatives of the Hispanic peoples of the Americas to join efforts and finish his liberating work. On board the Brig Mary, which brought 125 men under his command, Ducoudray Holstein wrote a letter to Mr. Boyé asking him to get the money required from Curiel to recruit one hundred men, indicating that once the boats returned from Mayagüez he would send 300 Daalders to his wife through an agent of the republic, may it be Curiel or anyone else.

Spanish authorities in Puerto Rico were well aware of what was happening, because the Governor of Saint Barthélemy, Johan Norderling, told them two brigantines and a schooner - part of the expedition commanded by Ducoudray Holstein, consisting of eight to nine ships with four hundred to five hundred men, six thousand rifles and large collection of gear to attack Puerto Rico - had arrived from New York and Boston to the island of Saint Barthélemy, which was a neutral port and a base of operations accessible to all, bound for the Dutch Island of Curaçao. They preferred to wait for the expedition to take shape and for all the involved vessels to meet in the Antilles. Another communication from New York reported Puerto Rican authorities that some local separatists had forwarded the sum of twenty-four thousand pesos to finance the costs of this expedition. Furthermore, all this was then confirmed by reports of don Angel Laborde, Commander of the base of Puerto Cabello in Costa Firme; of the Count of Ligny, Spanish agent in Santómas; don Juan Leamy, Spanish Vice-Consul in Philadelphia; and the Secretary of State in Madrid.

== Disclosure and arrests in Curacao ==
In the midst of his journey between San Bartolomé island and the port of La Guaira (Venezuela), Ducoudray and Irvine confronted a storm and rough seas which caused failures in two ships and forced them to change their plans. The owners of vessels decided to interrupt his trajectory and enter the port of Curaçao, where they arrived on September 21, 1822. The Brig Eendracht came under the command of Captain Gold, and the Brig, the Mary came under the command of captain Aaron Burns, commissioned by Ducoudray as captain of the Boricua Navy. Ducoudray and Irvine arrived in Curaçao in the company of a manager, five colonels, one hundred officers and many other Frenchmen which would integrate his projected expedition Puerto Rico, and with a good number of young men from the United States who, as mercenaries, would form part of the same expedition. For the most part these were respectable citizens. Among them was P. Heiliger, probably of the same Heyliger family from the island of San Eustaquio which was very prominent in Santa Cruz and was well established in Hormigueros and the northern coast of Mayagüez. Dutch authorities in Curaçao under pressure from the Spanish authorities in Puerto Rico decided to intervene. The Brig the Eendracht arrived credited by fake Dutch papers as a result Governor Paul R. Cantzlaar, Secretary William Prince, judge Serurier (Daniel Serurier, President of the Curaçao Tribunal of Justice), the Chief Executive Prosecutor Mr. Isaac James Rammelmann Elsevier, proceeded to confiscate the ship. The other brig, the Mary, in different circumstances, since its papers were in order, but it was also loaded in men and arms, was also intervened and put under surveillance by the Dutch authorities. Ducoudray, who had disembarked and was staying in attorney Elsevier house as a guest was arrested on September 23, 1822 and authorities occupied the valuable cargo of weapons that they brought. Also the proclamations and other documents that incorporated the true nature of their business and plans of landing by Añasco, where they would be joined by the men gathered by Peter Dubois in Puerto Rico to then take the city Mayagüez by military force, which was destined to establish the headquarters initially and then the Council of State and the capital city of the Boricua Republic.

Disembarking the valuable cargo of Ducoudray expedition ships, Curaçao's Dutch authorities found 6,000 rifles, 500 carbines, 150 pairs of pistols, 12 campaign cannons, 6 campaign gun carriages, 200 mounts, 15 cartridges barrels, 60 barrels of gunpowder and two boxes, one containing printed proclamations prepared in advance to be used as goals of the invasion were being achieved, and which revealed the purpose of the expedition, and the other filled with Cockades of four colors for the clothing of the expeditionary forces. It is likely that other vessels that were part of the expedition and never came to Curaçao were captured by general don Francisco Tomás Morales Spanish field marshal.

The Danish Governor of San Tomas; Peter Carl Frederick von Sholten wrote on October 8, 1822 to the Governor and Captain General of Puerto Rico don Miguel de la Torre, who had only a month in Office, offering information about the mulattos Pierre "Bidet" and Louis or François "Pinau" and telling him that the projected expedition had been prepared by a Frenchman called "Tonet", who in the past had been Governor of Guadalupe and was now a well-known agent of then Haitian President Jean Pierre Boyer. Peter Dubois was arrested by the authorities of Puerto Rico which occupied important documents. He was tried for the crime of conspiracy with foreigners, found guilty and executed on October 12, 1822 in the presence of slaves from several ingenios involved in the plot, in Guayama and in the vicinity of Añasco, place chosen by Ducoudray Holstein to carry out the landing of troops because of its lack of fortifications with artillery and its convenient proximity to Mayaguez.

== República Boricua ==
The expedition called for the proclamation of the República Boricua or Boricua Republic in Spanish. The word Boricua came from Boriquén, the Taino name for the island of Puerto Rico.

One of the documents the plotters prepared beforehand was a "Solemn act of the Declaration of Independence" there they wrote: "The Spanish government has given us the most forcible proofs of its tyranny, its bad faith, and of its incapacity to protect and to govern us". In the same document they held the Spanish king responsible for treating: "us a subjects, as slaves; it has been deaf to our just and lawful remonstrances," and later writing that "Fully impressed with these truths, we declare solemnly before the Almighty God, before the whole Universe, that we are resolved to suffer a similar tyranny no longer. A free, independent, and wise Government will give us happiness, strength, and consistency". Later on the declaration appoints the general-in-chief of the expedition (Ducoudray-Holstein) as president and provisional civil, political, and military chief until a National Congress could be assembled to discuss the project of a constitution and the installation of legislative, judicial, and executive powers.

Another document of Ducoudray-Holstein comprised orders to the officers of the expedition. It informed them "to cause the inhabitants to forget that you are strangers". He maintained that the soldiers try to learn Spanish, and to be virtuous by not using foul language, not drinking and not partaking in games of chance. The Republica Boricua was going to give people full citizenship, equality of rights and duties, regardless of "their skin color, their religion, and their birth place." Foreigners Americans; regardless of color, would make part of this new republic. The new republic was also envisioned of being made up of "thousands of foreigners" that would arrive.

The new republic would have a constitution. It would give equality to citizens of the new nation including freedom of religion. The new country would open its ports and its custom fees would be low. The republic's organization was also envisioned by the plotters. Each municipal council would send a deputy to the central council. Also political prisoners arrested by the Spanish would be liberated. On the other hand, the slave population of the island would not be freed since that would mean the collapse of the local economy. The government would be a liberal one, and in some time a congress and an improved constitution would be drafted. There would be separation of the three powers.

=== Mayagüez, capital of the Boricua Republic ===
Apart from Mayagüez being the cradle and the capital of the Freemasons in Puerto Rico, which was perhaps the best source of support and contacts, general Ducoudray Holstein had many reasons to make the capital of the Republic Boricua, Mayagüez since in the western area of Puerto Rico resided many of their more affluent advocates, it had a significant French population, given that it was the site where many French immigrants who managed to flee the French Saint Domingue were established. Furthermore, the Bay of Mayagüez was the largest and had one of the best ports of the island, the Ensenada of Mayagüez had the largest and fastest-growing population in Puerto Rico. The city lacked fortifications which could impede the invasion, and its port was the most active on the island, which, for being so distant from San Juan, would take longer for the Spanish forces to reach from the capital of San Juan.

== Trials ==
Ducoudray Holstein and Baptiste Irvine were judged in Curaçao during more than ten months as mercenaries and for disturbing the peace for sailing using false Dutch papers. Ducoudray claimed he had always kept well aware of the nature of his expedition to the Governor of Curaçao, and their damaged vessels had sought an emergency shelter in the neutral port of Curaçao, and that he was entitled to receive an equal treatment as another distinguished traveler in a foreign country, therefore had done nothing that deserved to deprive him of his liberty or his right to receive the hospitality of the place. He indicated that if Curaçao was neutral, there was no cause or reason to stop him nor to seize anything, because his expedition was not aimed against the Netherlands. He also pointed out that his accusers were a gang of bandits and pimps and that everything the Governor and his henchmen were interested in was to enrich themselves unfairly staying with ships, money, load, the accoutrements of war and other spoils of the Ducoudray Holstein expedition, which had cost more than 150,000 Rijksdaalders, excluding the value of the ships, all in clear detriment of prestige in the Netherlands. This gave rise to the most damaging murmurings and was public scandal.

The Civil Governor of Puerto Rico, Gonzalez de Linares insistently claimed shipment of Ducoudray - Holstein and other prisoners to Puerto Rico, but Dutch authorities in Curaçao refused to do so. Eventually Ducoudray Holstein and Baptiste Irvine were found guilty, sentenced to death and their possessions were confiscated by the Dutch authorities because of their alleged criminal acts. Ducoudray Holstein expressed that he did not fear for his life, because their executioners would not dare kill him when everyone knew that there was no evidence to justify such a thing. In fact, Leonard Sistare, who was convicted of altering the paper of the brig The Eendracht, had been allowed to leave Curaçao without receiving punishment or suffering any penalty.

When Ducoudray Holstein and Irvine appealed to the Superior Court of The Hague in the Netherlands, the appeal was denied. Then they requested a reconsideration of that judgment and this resource was also denied, but discomfort and the public outcry grew in such a way and came to have such a magnitude that the Governor, informed by his spies, instructed the President of the Court to grant the appeal. When everything seemed lost for them, they were granted that third appeal. Then the King of the Netherlands, William I of Orange-Nassau, received the advice of his Council of State and pardoned them, probably due to the influences of Lafayette and the government of the United States, which immediately allowed Ducoudray Holstein to immigrate to their country. The Minister of The Colonies of the Netherlands ordered the Governor of Curaçao to suspend all legal proceedings, which should be annulled and their records destroyed, that the accused be treated according to their ranks and education, released and that their expenses be paid until they reach a place chosen by them.

== Aftermath ==
When deported, Ducoudray Holstein sailed to the United States while Irvine, who was American, decided to move to Caracas, where he remained until 1824, when he moved to Puerto Cabello, the most important stronghold of Venezuela.

The President of the United States, James Monroe and John Quincy Adams, the United States Secretary of State, denied any involvement in this matter on the other hand three major U.S. citizens, including Sergeant Major Andrews, a former officer of the Army and Mr. Agnew, an influential landowner and ship owner who provided a good part of the funds for the expedition, and Mr. Baptiste Irvine who was the second in command of the Ducoudray expedition.

On April 5, 1824 Ducoudray arrived in New York City with María del Carmen, his wife and his sons decided on settling in the United States. He taught a course on military tactics and altered his own name, using instead of his name, and as first name, the surname Lafayette, perhaps to conform to the American way of using names or to honor his friend whom he owed his life and freedom, because that same year, at the behest of the United States Congress, the Marquis de Lafayette was invited by President James Monroe to visit United States, something that made on July 12, 1824. Lafayette was baptism godfather to the eldest son of Ducoudray, who was called La Fayette in honor of his godfather.

The Ducoudray family, with their three children, settled in the village of Seneca, on the outskirts of Albany and near Geneva in the State of New York, and since then the General retired to live the quiet life of a university professor teaching at Geneva College (today Hobart & Smith) in New York and in the Albany Female College. Ducoudray Holstein died in Albany in 1839 and his remains rest in the rural cemetery in the city. His family continued to live there for 25 years until the death of his son Lafayette D. Holstein in 1864. He had reduced the Ducoudray surname to a mere middle initial to have his surname be simply Holstein.

== See also ==
- Military history of Puerto Rico
- Ramón Emeterio Betances
- Antonio Valero de Bernabé
- María de las Mercedes Barbudo
- El Grito de Lares
- Intentona de Yauco
- Puerto Rican Campaign
- Puerto Rico Independence Party
- Puerto Rican Nationalist Party
