= Manuel del Castillo y Rada =

Neogranadine general

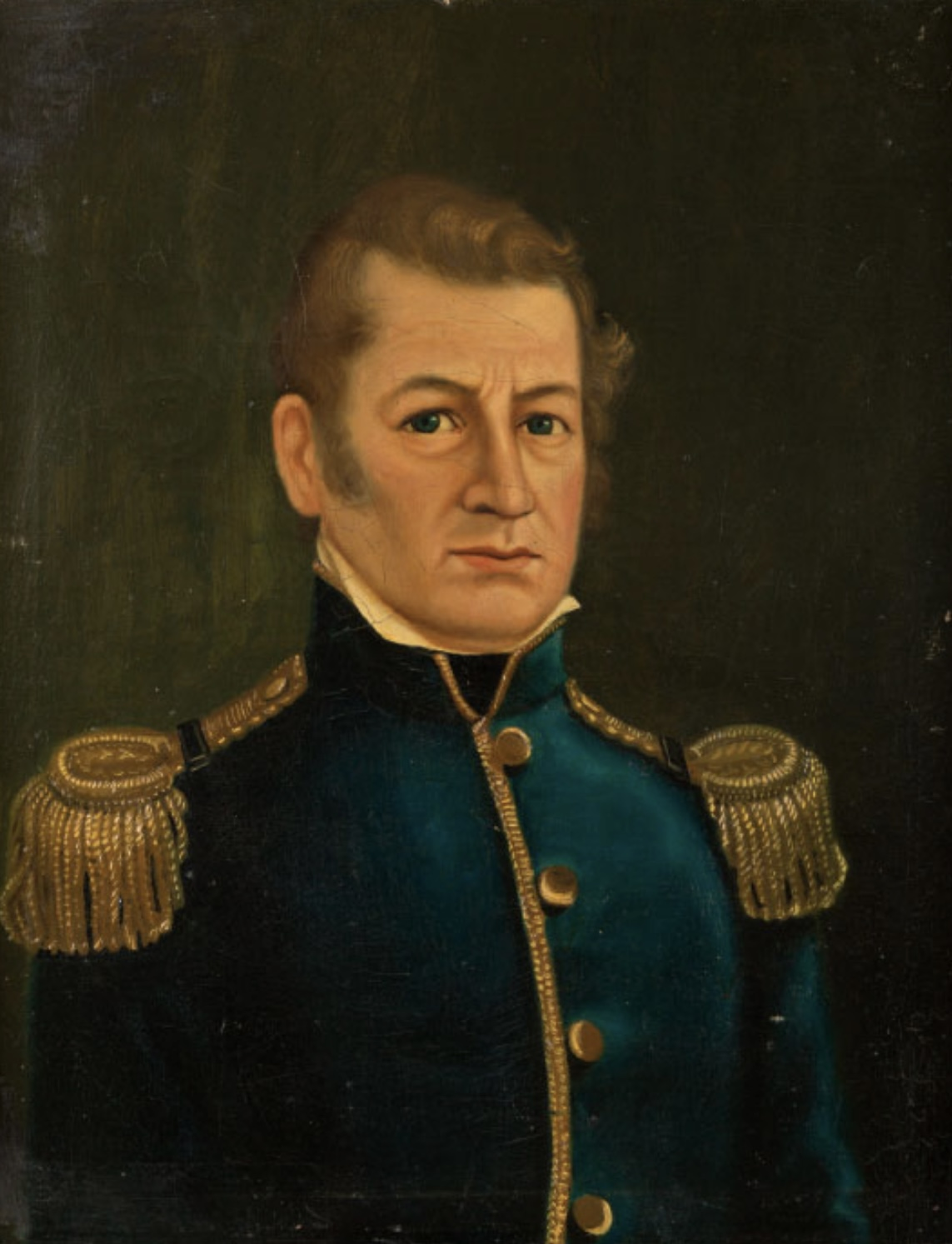
Manuel del Castillo Y Rada (1781–1816) posthumous portrait by Constancio Franco Vargas

Manuel del Castillo y Rada (Cartagena de Indias, 1781 – Cartagena de Indias, 24 February 1816) was a Neogranadine general, who fought for the independence of New Granada from Spain. He was executed during the Spanish Reconquista after the Siege of Cartagena (1815), by order of Pablo Morillo.

== Biography ==
His father was Don Nicolás del Castillo, a native of Alicante, and his mother, Doña Manuela Rada, of aristocratic lineage. His elder brother was José María del Castillo y Rada. He was orphaned at the age of five. He married Isabel de Blasco on 6 August 1815. After obtaining the degree of Doctor of Law, he joined the militia with the rank of captain.

On 19 November 1810 he joined the National Battalion in Santa Fe de Bogotá. In January 1811, the government of Santa Fe entrusted him with incorporating the province of Mariquita into Cundinamarca. Castillo then returned to Santafé where Antonio Nariño had become president. In January 1812, Manuel del Castillo joined Commander Joaquín París Ricaurte to submit the province of El Socorro to Cundinamarca. Castillo was then appointed by Congress as commander of the Province of Pamplona and head of the army vanguard in order to protect the Union from the Royalist forces in Venezuela.

In December 1812, Colonel Castillo joined Bolívar's troops to attack the Royalist army from Tunja and Cartagena. Bolívar's forces were supported by hundreds of Castillo's men in the victorious Battle of Cúcuta on 28 February 1813. However, relations deteriorated due to Bolívar's plan to continue towards Caracas, and Castillo's refusal to follow him.

In January 1814 he was appointed military commander of Cartagena de Indias. On 25 September 1814, Bolívar returned to Cartagena after the destruction of the Second Republic of Venezuela. Castillo supported the legitimate government of Cartagena against a revolt, and with the help of Pedro Gual Escandón, he took control over Cartagena on 18 January 1815.
In March 1815, Simón Bolívar was advancing to take Santa Marta and requested extra men and supplies from Cartagena, but Manuel del Castillo refused to support him. As a reaction, Bolívar laid siege to Cartagena for a month and a half, without success. The siege was lifted on 8 May and a disillusioned Bolivar left New Granada for Jamaica.

In the meantime, a large Spanish fleet under command of Pablo Morillo had arrived on the Venezuelan coast in April. In August 1815, Pablo Morillo arrived in Santa Marta to restore the monarchy in New Granada. From there he advanced on Cartagena and besieged the city from 18 August.

Manuel del Castillo led the defense of Cartagena until October, when a conspiracy of José Francisco Bermúdez, Mariano Montilla and Louis-Michel Aury deposed him from military command and placed him under arrest. In December, the situation in the city had become so desperate that the revolutionary leaders decided to escape by the sea, the imminent occupation by Morillo's army. But Manuel Castillo was prohibited from accompanying them in their escape, under threat of death.

Left at the mercy of the Spanish, commander Manuel del Castillo y Rada was tried by a Permanent War Council established by the Spanish government and shot on 24 February 1816.

== Sources ==
- El Universal
- Historia biografia
- bicentenarioindependencia.gov.co
