= Mariano Montilla =

Venezuelan major general

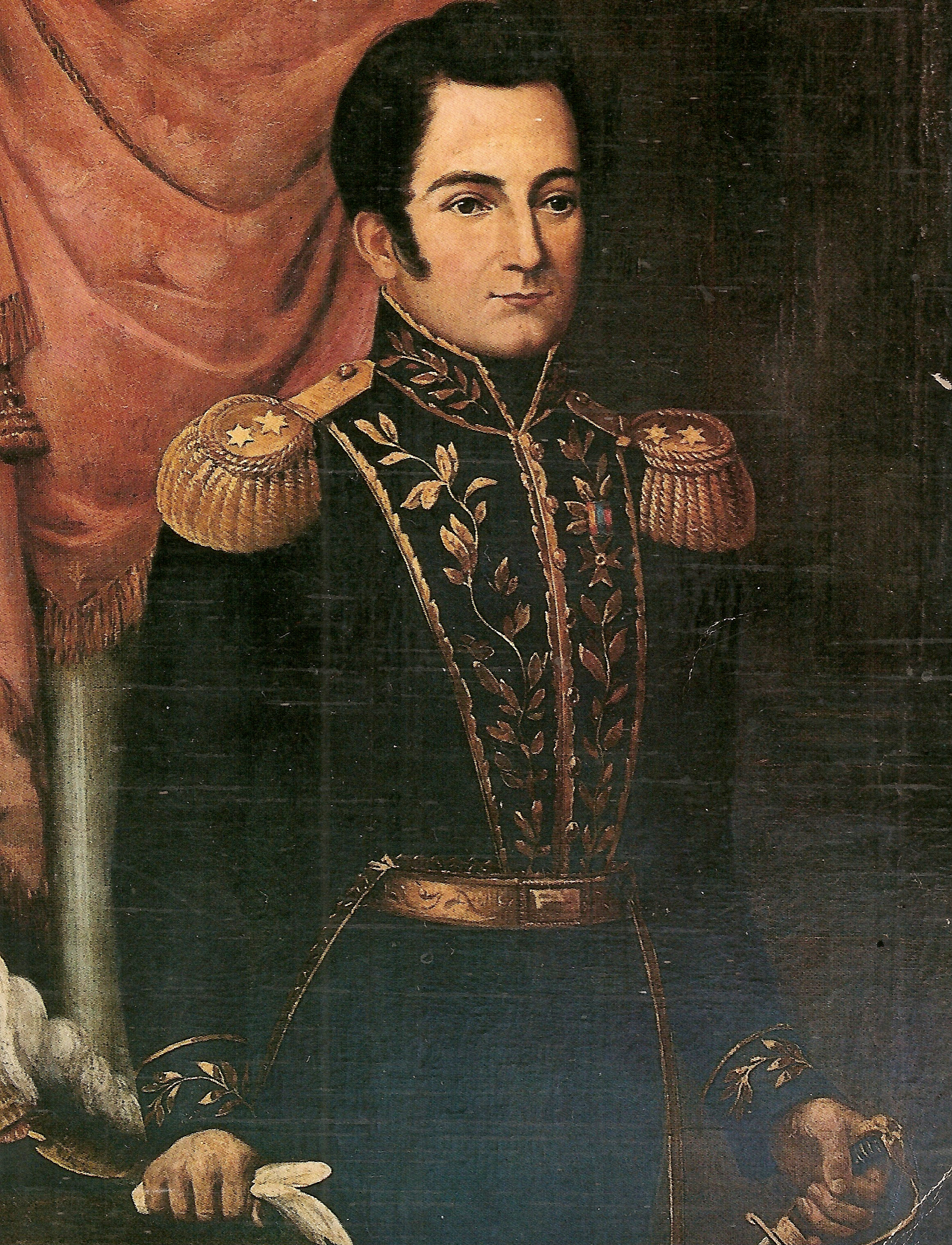
Mariano Montilla. Portrait by Martín Tovar y Tovar

Mariano Montilla (8 September 1782 in Caracas – 22 September 1851 in Caracas) was a major general of the Army of Venezuela in the Venezuelan War of Independence.

== Biography ==
=== Youth ===
As a young man he went to Spain where he joined the American King's Life Guard. In 1801, under the command of Manuel Godoy, he fought in the Oranges War between Spain and Portugal and was wounded at the battle of Olivenza. He then returned to Caracas. In 1808 he was active in the emerging revolution for the independence of Venezuela. Following the events of the Revolution of April 19, 1810 where Montilla participated, the commanding General and other colonial officials designated by Joseph Bonaparte to oversee the Captaincy General of Venezuela, were deposed by an expanded municipal government in Caracas that called itself: the Supreme Junta to Preserve the Rights of Ferdinand VII (La Suprema Junta Conservadora de los Derechos de Fernando VII). One of the first measures of revolutionaries was to send diplomatic missions abroad to seek support and recognition of the Supreme Junta of Caracas as the legitimate councilor of Venezuela in the absence of the King. Montilla along with Vicente Salias were sent by the Junta to Jamaica and Curaçao to spread the news about revolutionaries events in Venezuela. Later that year he was appointed commander of a squadron of militia volunteers from the valleys of Aragua. Subordinate first to the Marquis del Toro, then to Francisco de Miranda, in 1811 he fought in the insurgency that erupted in Valencia. Between 1811 and 1812 he retired to Philadelphia in the United States to recover his health.

=== War of Independence ===
After the campaign of 1813 Mariano Montilla joined the forces of Simón Bolívar and was engaged in several battles between 1813 and 1814. In 1814, following defeat by the royalists, he was forced to emigrate to Cartagena de Indias in the New Granada, where he undertook the defense of the city against the siege imposed by the Spanish general Pablo Morillo. He was named military governor of the city and promoted to colonel in 1815. When the city fell to Morillo army on December 6, 1815, he escaped to Haiti, and later aided general Bolívar in the unsuccessful naval expedition of Los Cayos. After a period of residence in the United States, in 1817 he took command of the island of Margarita, from which base he led the campaigns against Barcelona and Cumana.

In 1820, in Margarita, he took command of the Irish Legion which had newly arrived under the leadership of William Aylmer and Francis O'Connor. Bolivar employed the Legion as an amphibious raiding force supported by Luis Brion fleet, harassing royalist garrisons on the north coast of New Granada to distract enemy attention from his own inland campaign. As commanding general Montilla led in the battles of Fonseca, Tablazo and Molino, the withdrawal from Valledupar and the successful battle of Laguna Salada. Later in 1820 he landed in Sabanilla, in the province of Cartagena, opened the port for trade, defeated the royalists at Pueblo Nuevo and established communications with Bolivar's forces in the interior of New Granada.

In September 1821 he was promoted to brigadier general and that year continue the pivotal siege of Cartagena assisted by naval forces under José Prudencio Padilla. The city fell on October 10, 1821, after a siege lasting 159 days. Among the defenders who surrendered was Brigadier Gabriel Torres, commander of the royalist forces. The patriots captured large stores of gunpowder, lead, rifles and field pieces. In 1823 Maracaibo fell to the forces sent by the Spanish Field Marshal Francisco Tomás Morales. Montilla moved to Riohacha to establish a base of operations for the liberation of Maracaibo, which was achieved after a Battle of Lake Maracaibo fought on July 24, 1823, isolated the Spanish from relief.

=== Later career ===
In 1824, Montilla was appointed commanding general of the department of Zulia and promoted to divisional general. The following year he returned to Cartagena de Indias, where he served as commander of the department of Magdalena. In 1828 he was appointed leader of department of the Isthmus (Panama) and Magdalena. In 1830 he was involved in a movement that supported Rafael Urdaneta as president of Gran Colombia. As a result, in January 1832, the Ministry of War and Navy of New Granada passed a decree deemed him a traitor to the fatherland and expelled him from New Granada. However, in January 1833, Congress allowed him to return, and in November 1833 Montilla was appointed minister plenipotentiary to restore friendly relations with England and France and to seek recognition of Venezuelan independence from Spain, a mission that was largely successful. He died in Caracas in 1851, and in 1896 his remains were moved to the National Pantheon of Venezuela.

== Legacy ==
Montilla appears as a Comandante General in Sid Meier's Civilization VI, available only to users playing as the Gran Colombia civilization.
