= Siege of Cartagena (1815) =

Part of the Colombian War of Independence

- Part of the Colombian War of Independence
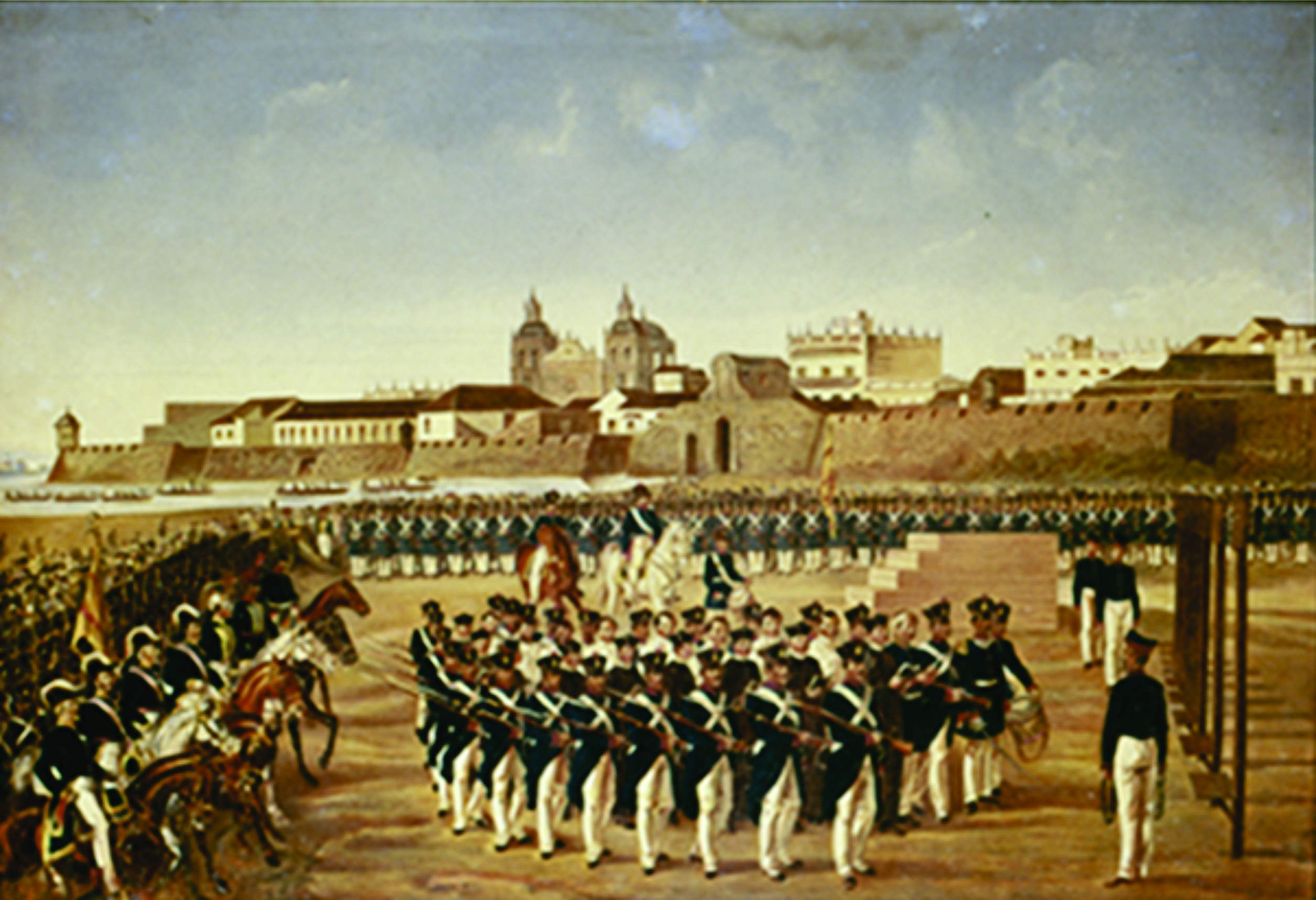
- Execution of "the 9 Martyrs" outside Cartagena on 24 February 1816
Date	26 August – 6 December 1815 (105 days)
Location	Cartagena de Indias, Viceroyalty of New Granada 10°24′N 75°30′W
Result	Spanish victory

Belligerents
United Provinces of New Granada	Kingdom of Spain and the Indies (the Spains)

Commanders and leaders
Manuel del Castillo y Rada; José Francisco Bermúdez	Pablo Morillo; Francisco Tomás Morales

Strength
2,600 soldiers 1,000 militia 360 artillery pieces	11,000 soldiers

Casualties and losses
200 killed 400 prisoners executed	3,000 dead (most disease); 3,000 sick in hospital
- 6,000 civilians dead from hunger or disease

The siege of Cartagena (1815) (Spanish: Asedio español de Cartagena de Indias) was a successful 105-day Spanish siege by combined naval and ground forces under command of General Pablo Morillo, of the Colombian city and fortress of Cartagena de Indias, defended by Republican forces under the leadership of Manuel del Castillo y Rada and José Francisco Bermúdez, between August and December 1815.

== Background ==
The United Provinces of New Granada had declared its independence from Spain in 1811, and by 1815 controlled large parts of present-day Colombia. But in 1815, after the defeat of Napoleon, the restored King Ferdinand VII of Spain had sent a large fleet under command of Pablo Morillo to restore order in the colonies and destroy the Republic.

Pablo Morillo and his veteran troops landed in Santa Marta, which was still in the hands of the Royalists. Reinforced with some 3000 llaneros under command of Francisco Tomás Morales, he marched on the major port city of Cartagena de Indias.

His Republican opponents were deeply divided. Between 1812 and 1814, the New Granada Civil War between the United Provinces of New Granada and the Free and Independent State of Cundinamarca had weakened the Patriots.
In March 1815, Simón Bolívar was advancing to take Santa Marta and requested extra men and supplies from Cartagena, but the city's Governor general, Manuel del Castillo y Rada refused to support him. As a reaction, Bolívar laid siege to Cartagena for a month and a half, without success. The siege was lifted on 8 May and a disillusioned Bolivar, who had lost half his army to disease and desertion against a so-called ally, left New Granada for Jamaica.

== The siege ==
On 26 August, Morillo and his army arrived before the walls of Cartagena.
Morillo was informed that the Republican authorities not only had not evacuated the residents of Cartagena, but also had allowed the surrounding population to take refuge in the fortress, thereby increasing the number of besieged to 18,000 people. Therefore, the Spaniards decided not to storm the fortress, but to achieve its surrender by starving it out.

During the siege, food supply became the main problem facing the besieged city. A month after the siege had begun, famine set in, aggravated by disease caused by unsanitary conditions. During the last 22 days of the siege, the defenders began to cook and eat leather goods, and there were even cases of cannibalism. More soldiers died from hunger than in battle.

In turn, the Spanish soldiers did not tolerate the tropical climate well and suffered from yellow fever and dysentery. Mortality from disease began to exceed losses from combat. Morillo decided to intensify military operations. The Spaniards twice tried to capture Tesca Lagoon in order to strengthen the naval blockade of the fortress, but both times they were forced to retreat, having suffered heavy losses.

On 17 October, the commander of Cartagena, Manuel Castillo, was relieved of command and replaced by the Venezuelan general José Francisco Bermúdez. To prolong the defense of the fortress, Bermudez ordered the requisition of all available food supplies and set fixed prices for them.

On 11–12 November, an assault was launched on two key defensive points - the Corma heights, where the Candelario monastery was located, turned by the Republicans into a real fortress, and the island of Tierrabomba. The defense of the monastery was led by Venezuelan Lieutenant Colonel Carlos Soublette. He had only 130 men fighting against 800 Spaniards. At the most critical moment of the battle, the patriots were supported by the cannons of Castle San Felipe de Barajas, and the Spaniards were forced to abandon further attempts to break through to Cartagena from land.

Simultaneously with the assault on the Candelario monastery, Morales launched an attack on Tierra Bomba Island. He managed to cut off the mainland forts that protected Bocachica from the fortress. In a hurry to build on his success, Morales attacked Fort Angel on the island itself, but, despite heavy losses, he was unable to take it.

On 4 December, Morillo sent an ultimatum to the fortress authorities, offering to capitulate within three days. On the same day, at a council of war, the defenders of Cartagena decided not to capitulate, but to try to get out of the besieged city by sea and head towards Jamaica or Haiti. On the night of 5 December, the Cartagena authorities and some of the defenders set sail on ships, many of them corsairs, others merchant ships, under command of the French corsair Louis-Michel Aury. Of the nearly 2,000 people who left on 6 merchant ships and 10 armed schooners, only 600 people managed to reach Haiti. Many ships sank, ran aground or returned to port and were captured by the Spaniards.

On 6 December 1815, Morillo's troops occupied Cartagena, whose streets were littered with the corpses of the dead. Of the 18,000 civilians, 6,000 had died from epidemics and famine.

== Consequences ==
The loss of Cartagena, the city that had been at the vanguard of independence, was a heavy blow to Republican morale. It was the best defended city, and the most likely place to have been able to stop Morillo's force, as it had done with the British in 1741. Instead, Morillo would go on to reconquer the rest of the Viceroyalty of New Granada in short order, entering Bogotá on 6 May 1816. He restored the power of the Spanish crown with very tough measures, in a period which the New Granadians called the “Reign of terror”.

In Cartagena, many Republicans who hadn't been able to escape over sea were executed, including Manuel del Castillo y Rada and José María García de Toledo as part of a group later known as the 9 Martyrs. José Francisco Bermúdez had escaped by boat, together with Antonio José de Sucre, Carlos Soublette, Gregor MacGregor, Bartolomé Salom, Mariano Montilla, Henri La Fayette, José Prudencio Padilla and others who would later play an important role in the struggle against Spanish domination.

== Sources ==
- Córdova : gloria y asesinato del héroe. Tomo I / Armando Barona Mesa; prólogo del académico Antonio Cacua Prada
- Cartagena Explorer: The Siege of Cartagena – La Heroica Bravely Resists the Spanish Reconquest

== Links ==
- Durán Becerra, Tomás (2009). El sitio de Cartagena por parte de Pablo Morillo como escenario del choque de legitimidades entre la monarquía española y los movimientos independentistas de la Nueva Granada. Bogotá: Facultad de Ciencia Política y Gobierno de la Universidad Colegio Mayor de Nuestra Señora del Rosario, pp. 33–36.
- Mercado, Jorge (2015) [1963]. Campaña de Invasión del Teniente General don Pablo Morillo 1815–1816: El régimen del terror. Ediciones LAVP, pp. 98. ISBN 9781508504900.
- Encina, Francisco Antonio (1961). Bolívar y la independencia de la América española: Independencia de Nueva Granada y Venezuela (parte 1). Tomo III. Santiago: Nascimiento pp. 560–578.
- Albi, Julio (1990). Banderas olvidadas: el ejército realista en América. Madrid: Instituto de Cooperación Iberoamericana, pp. 154. ISBN 978-84-7232-547-0.
- Jesús María Henao & Gerardo Arrubla (1820). Historia de Colombia para la enseñanza secundaria. Tomo II. Bogotá: Librería Colombiana, C. Roldán & Tamayo, pp. 335.
