= José Prudencio Padilla =

Colombian admiral in the Spanish American wars of independence

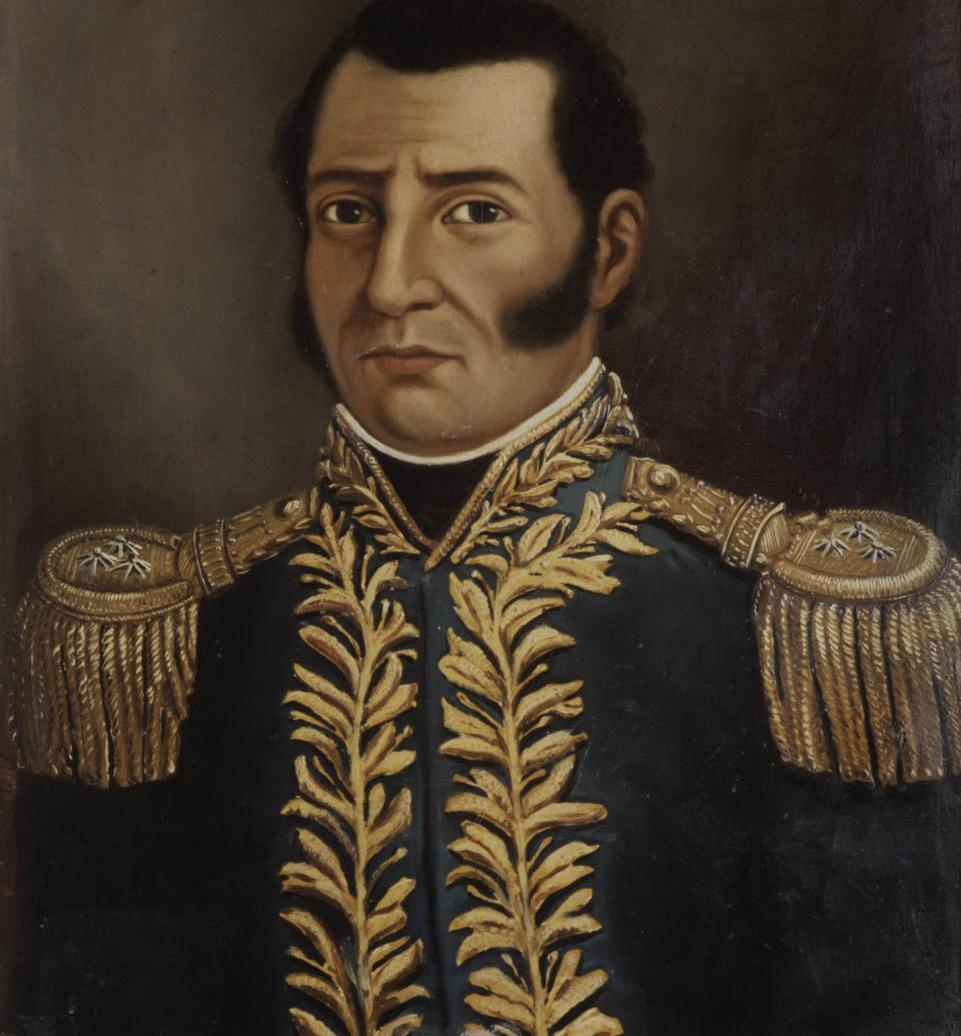
- Born: 19 March 1784; Riohacha, Viceroyalty of New Granada
- Died: 2 October 1828 (aged 44); Bogotá, Gran Colombia
- Military career
- Allegiance: Kingdom of Spain (1798–1811); United Provinces of New Granada (1811-1819); Gran Colombia
- Branch: Spanish Navy; Colombian National Navy; Bolivarian Navy of Venezuela
- Service years: 1798-1828
- Rank: Boatswain (Spanish Navy); Admiral (Colombian Navy)
- Conflicts: War of the Third Coalition; Battle of Trafalgar; Colombian War of Independence; Siege of Cartagena (1815); Bolívar's campaign to liberate New Granada; Siege of Cartagena (1820–21); Venezuelan War of Independence; Battle of Lake Maracaibo

Admiral José Prudencio Padilla López (Riohacha, 19 March 1784, – Bogotá, Colombia, 2 October 1828) was a Neogranadine military leader who fought in the Spanish American wars of independence and a hero in the battles of independence for Gran Colombia (present-day Colombia, Venezuela, Ecuador and Panama).
He was the foremost naval hero of the campaign for independence led by Simón Bolívar, and the creator of the first Navy and Admiral of Great Colombia. He is best known for his victory in the Battle of Lake Maracaibo on 24 July 1823, in which a royalist Spanish fleet was defeated.

== Life and career ==
His parents were Andres Padilla, who was a builder of small boats, and Lucia Lopez. He started life as a seaman at 14 years old in the service of merchant's vessels sailing between overseas ports and the Spanish homeland, and appeared as a porter at the Royal Spanish chamber of the New Kingdom of Granada.
On October 21, 1805, he received his baptism of fire at the battle of Trafalgar, where he served aboard the San Juan Nepomuceno where he would be wounded and taken prisoner by the English. In 1808, after his release he returned to Spain, where he was appointed to the boatswain's arsenal at Cartagena de Indias. On April 11, 1811, he took part in the decision of the people of Getsemani, who, in sympathy with the city of Cartagena, joined in the proclamation of independence of Cundinamarca, thus disregarding the authority of the metropolis. In 1814, he saw action at Tolu and captured a Royalist sloop of war with a crew of 170 that was heading to Panama. Although the ship he captured had more powerful guns than the one he commanded, it could not resist the attack and surrendered. In recognition of this, the Granadino government awarded Padilla with a promotion as the second frigate lieutenant.

In 1815, he served under the command of Simón Bolívar when he marched from Bogotá to free Santa Marta. In Cartagena de Indias, he was present at the siege by the army of General Pablo Morillo, which the Republicans attempted to hold, until it became impossible to resist the siege and the leaders fled by boat.
Later on he went to Jamaica, and as Captain, he met Bolívar in Haiti to reinforce the expedition which sailed from Los Cayos de San Luis on March 31, 1816, where he won the naval victory at Los Frailes (May 2), and conducted the landing at Carúpano (June 1). Afterwards, he was promoted to frigate captain and commander in chief of the riverine forces, where he made significant inroads over the province of Cumana. In 1819, he participated in the campaign of Casanare, in which he managed the transportation of troops and war material.
As second-in-command to Admiral Luis Brión he arrived at Riohacha on March 12, 1820, where he fought in the battles of Laguna Salada, Pueblo Viejo, Tenerife, La Barra, Ciénaga de Santa Marta and San Juan. Named commander-in-chief of the forces of the Republic that besieged Cartagena, he captured several Spanish vessels. On April 19, 1823, he was promoted to brigadier general of the Colombian Navy. This time he was invested with the office of commander-general of the Third Department of the Navy and of the Zulia Theater of Operations; on this position, he did a brilliant job that culminated on July 24, 1823, in the naval battle of Lake Maracaibo, in which he defeated the Spanish squadron, which led to the capitulation of the field marshal Francisco Tomás Morales the following August 3, 1823.

=== Incarceration and death ===
On November 24, 1826, he was promoted to general of division. However, at the beginning of 1828, Padilla was linked to an act of indiscipline in which several officers were involved in Cartagena, after which he was arrested and sent to prison in Bogotá on May 26, 1828. During the night of September 25, 1828, while Padilla was still in prison, an attack was carried out against the life of the Liberator (Septembrine Conspiracy). Some 40 men assaulted the San Carlos Palace to assassinate Simón Bolívar, but he jumped out of the window and escaped. In the meantime, some conspirators scaled the walls of the building which served as a prison, to release Padilla and appoint him as their chief. Padilla seems to have refused and there is no record of his escape, but he was judged by a tribunal for the charge of conspiracy, then sentenced to death and executed in the Plaza de la Constitución in Bogotá on 2 October 1828.

The remains of Admiral Padilla lie inside the Cathedral of Our Lady of Remedios in Riohacha, which was declared in his honor as a Cultural Heritage of the Colombian nation.

== Honors ==
=== Colombia ===
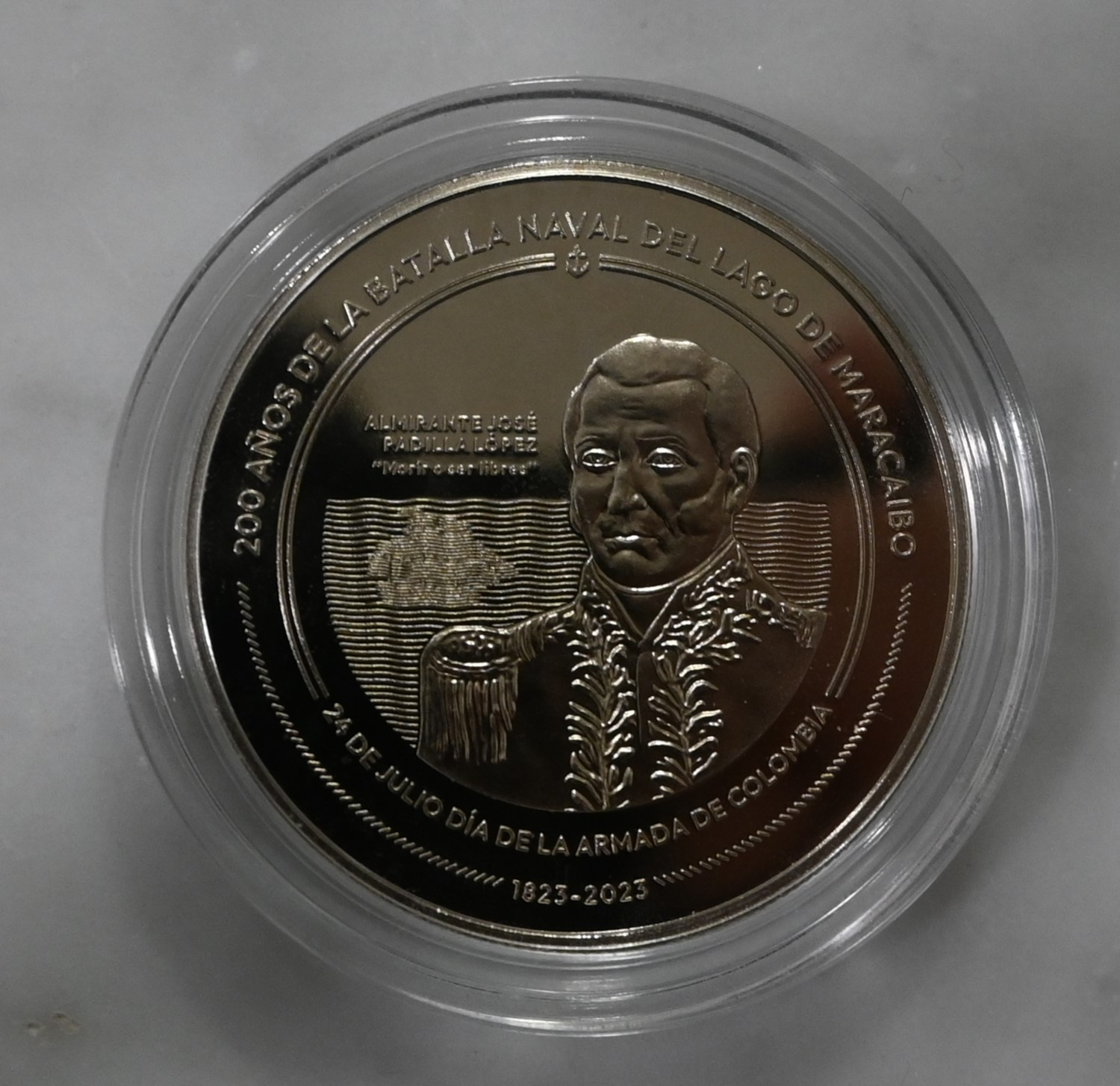
10,000 COP commemorative coin celebrating the 200th Anniversary of the Battle of Lake Maracaibo

In Colombia, the airport of his hometown Riohacha, was named Almirante Padilla Airport in his honor. The Colombian Navy's Officer Academy, Escuela Naval de Cadetes Almirante Padilla, was also named in his honor. Several ships of the Colombian Navy have been named ARC Almirante Padilla in his honor, the current class of frigates that the ARC have in service are named Almirante Padilla-class frigates and the first ship of this class that was laid down was named ARC Almirante Padilla (FM-51). There is also the Order of Naval Merit Admiral Padilla also named in his honor.

In 2023, in commemoration of the 200th anniversary of the Naval Battle of Lake Maracaibo the Central Bank of Colombia released a commemortaive coin with a value of $10,000 COP, the obverse side of the coin includes the image of Admiral José Padilla López with the inscription of the phrase "Morir o ser libres” (To die or to be free) which was a proclamation to his men before the historic battle started. The reverse side of the coin contains the coat of arms of the Colombian National Navy.

=== Venezuela ===
In Venezuela he is commemorated with the naming of the Almirante Padilla Municipality in Zulia State. 2023
