= Benito Salas Vargas =

Colombian military leader

- Born: April 1770; Guayabal, Viceroyalty of New Granada
- Died: 18 September 1816 (aged 46); Neiva, Huila, United Provinces of New Granada
- Spouse: Juana Lopez
- Children: 5
- Military career
- Allegiance: United Provinces of New Granada
- Conflicts: Battle of Cuchilla del Tambo; Battle of La Plata

Benito Salas Vargas (April 1770 – 18 September 1816) was a Colombian soldier who participated in the Colombian War of Independence against the Spanish. However, he was captured by the Spanish after the Battle of La Plata and executed. Benito Salas Airport was named in his honour in 1986.

== Early life ==
Benito Salas Vargas was born in Guayabal, in April 1770, to Santiago de la Sala and Andrea de Vargas. He was one of their five children. He married Juana Lopez in Neiva, Huila in 1799, and fathered five children.

== Revolution ==
In 1811, Salas joined the forces of Brigadier Jose Diaz, who was under the command of Antonio Baraya. Salas swore his allegiance to the United Provinces of New Granada in Timaná on 8 December 1812. He fought with Antonio Nariño. He participated in the Battle of Cuchilla del Tambo on 29 June 1816. He was taken captive after the Battle of La Plata on 10 July.

Lieutenant Colonel Ruperto Delgado presided over the trial and the jury was made up by members of the Batallón Voltígeros de la Guardia. Salas and five other men were found guilty by the court and were executed in Neiva by firing squad on 18 September 1816. The men were buried by priest Felipe Bernal the same day.

== Legacy ==
Salas was the maternal grandfather of writer Ubaldina Dávila.

According to tradition Salas' head and hands were buried on the La Manguita estate near Neiva after being on display in the main square of the city. An airfield was created on the La Manguita estate in 1932 due to the Colombia-Peru War. This airstrip was expanded into the La Manguita airport, which was inaugurated on 14 August 1936. The airport was renamed to the Benito Salas Airport in honour of Salas in 1986.

== Works cited ==
=== Books ===
- María, Pedro (1891). Crónicas de Bogotá. Vol. 3. Imprenta de La Luz. Archived from the original on 2017-09-05.

=== Journals ===
- de Paula Plazas Sánchez, Francisco (1981). "Familia Salas" (PDF). Boletín de Historia y Antigüedades (736). Colombian Academy of History: 245–266. Archived from the original on 2026-05-21.

=== News ===
- "Huellas de la Independencia en el Huila". La Nación. 17 July 2010. Archived from the original on 27 September 2011.
- Calderón, Martha (3 December 2022). "Waldina Dávila Ponce De León Escritora huilense del siglo XIX con proyección universal". Diario del Huila. Archived from the original on 21 May 2026.
