= Battle of Cachirí =

Part of the Colombian War of Independence

- Part of the Colombian War of Independence
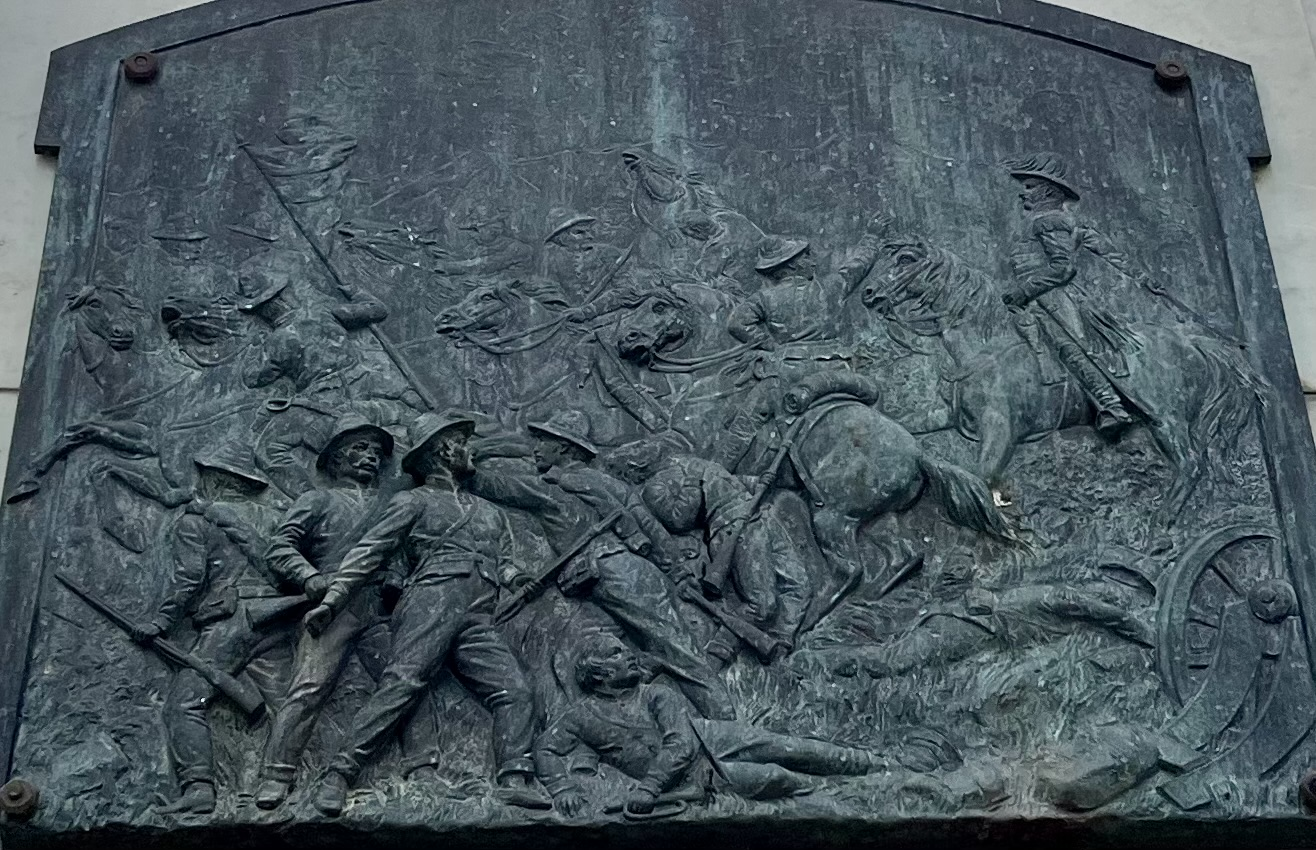
- A relieve depicting the battle.
Date	22 February 1816
Location	Cachirí, Pamplona Province, United Provinces of New Granada(present-day Santander Department, Colombia) 7°32′18″N 72°59′10″W
Result	Spanish victory

Belligerents
New Granada	Kingdom of Spain and the Indies

Commanders and leaders
Custodio García Rovira; Francisco de Paula Santander; José Maria Vergara y Lozano	(Spain) Sebastián de la Calzada (Spain) Carlos Tolrá

Strength
~2,080	~2,100 and 1 artillery piece

Casualties and losses
1,200 killed and wounded 500 captured 2 guns lost	150 killed or wounded

The Battle of Cachirí took place on February 21–22, 1816, during the Spanish Reconquest of New Granada as part of the Colombian War of Independence. The battle is named after the Paramo de Cachirí, which is located in the Santander Department in present-day Colombia. It was fought between the Army of the North of the United Provinces of New Granada and the V Division of Spanish Expeditionary Army. The battle came about as an attempt by brigadier general Custodio Garcia Rovira to defend the Socorro Province as well as the interior of the country from the invasion force led by Spanish colonel Sebastian de la Calzada, who was part of general Pablo Morillo's campaign to reconquer New Granada. Rovira went on the offensive on February 8, forcing Calzada to retreat from Pamplona to Ocaña. Whilst there, 300 cazadores under the command of Captain Silvestre Llorente were incorporated into his division. With these reinforcements, he swiftly countermarched south and met the republicans at the Paramo Cachiri.

Between February 21 and 22, 1816, fierce fighting occurred. On the first day, the Republicans managed to control the situation and put up a stiff defense thanks to the fortifications they had built days prior. The next day the fight resumed with greater fury, and the Spanish through a flanking maneuver supported by artillery were able to break the republican line and to cause havoc amongst their ranks, after which they deployed their cavalry which dispersed the republican troops causing them to flee.

Republican troops who were not killed or taken prisoner, dispersed in various directions, abandoning their supply train and weapons which fell into the hands of the Spanish. Calzada's decisive victory meant that entire northern line of defense had collapsed landscape, as well as clearing the path for his advance to the republican capital at Santa Fe.

The battle led to the virtual destruction of the Army of the North. Rovira was sacked from his command and replaced by French Colonel Manuel Roergas de Serviez. Calzada halted his advance until Brigadier Miguel de la Torre's expeditionary troops joined up with his, the two then captured the capital, Santafé, on May 6, 1816.

This battle along with the battles of Cuchilla del Tambo and La Plata fought in June and July 1816 would mark the end of the first Neogranadine republic and the return of Spanish control over New Granada until 1819.

== Background ==
The United Provinces of New Granada had declared its independence from Spain in 1811, and by 1815 controlled large parts of present-day Colombia. But in 1815, after the defeat of Napoleon, the restored King Ferdinand VII of Spain had sent a large fleet under command of Pablo Morillo to restore order in the colonies and destroy the Republic.

After landing in Venezuela in April 1815, Morillo began to meticulously plan the reconquest of New Granada, while the main invasion force involved attacking the strategic port city of Cartagena de Indias, another force would invade New Granada from the east in Venezuela. On May 15, 1815, Morillo ordered Spanish colonel Sebastian de la Calzada to raise an army in Barinas to do this, this would be Fifth division of the Spanish Expeditionary Army.

In July 1815 Morillo landed in Santa Marta, and deployed an advance force to take the river port of Mompox whilst he and his veteran troops besieged and starved in to submission the major port city of Cartagena de Indias between 26 August and 6 December 1815. In the meantime, Calzada and his 5th Division invaded New Granada on October 18, 1815, from the town of Guasdualito and penetrated the eastern plains of the Casanare province of New Granada. Calzada's goal was to pivot north and captured the important cities of Ocaña and Pamplona which would clear the road to the capital Santafé de Bogotá by the time Morillo's forces would come marching down after taking Cartagena. Calzada's V Division had some 2,211 men divided into 2 infantry regiments, 4 companies of cazadores, 2 cavalry squadrons (one of carabiners and the other lancers) and a company of artillery men with 4 artillery pieces.

When the Spanish penetrated the eastern llanos, the only republican army in the vicinity to face them was the Army of the East under the command of Brigadier Joaquín Ricaurte Torrijos who had at his disposal 150 infantrymen and 1,000 cavalry. Ricaurte intercepted Calzada's forces on 31 October in an area called Chire. At the Battle of Chire, the republicans were victorious however Calzada's troops were able to escape destruction as Ricaurte's cavalry did not press their attack but instead focused on looting their defeated enemy, historian José Manuel Restrepo argued that had the republicans conducted a second cavalry charge they would have probably destroyed Calzada's army. Despite escaping total destruction, Calzada's forces had suffered some 200 dead and around 300 captured and missing as a result of the battle, nevertheless he continued his invasion, pivoting northward and crossed the Cordillera Oriental of the Andes through the Chita Pass into the Tunja Province with aims of marching towards Cúcuta.

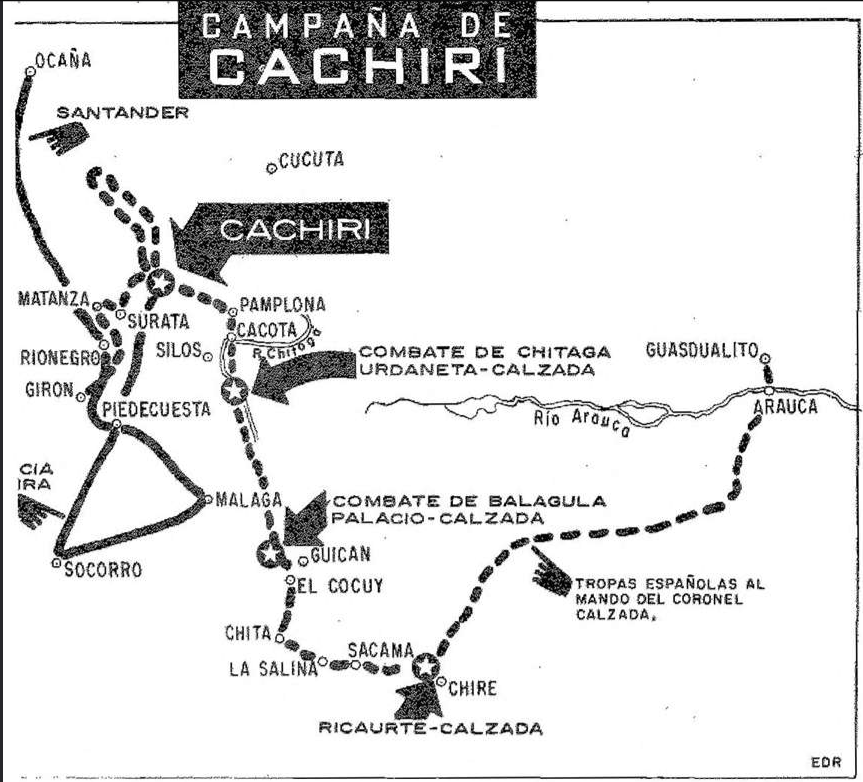
Map showing the routes taken by the Spanish and republican armies during Calzadas invasion before and after the Battle of Cachiri 1815–1816.

The republicans having received very little intelligence on the composition of Cazlada's troops, believed that he had only 400 troops which were described as being in bad condition based on the report given to the government by Brigadier Ricaurte following the Battle of Chire. Based on this information, the Governor of the Pamplona province Fernando Serrano and the commander of the army of the union in Cúcuta; General Rafael Urdaneta attempted to intercept Calzada at the Chitaga river and defeat him there. The republicans gathered a force of 500 infantry and 500 lancer cavalry to oppose him, however to their surprise the 400 strong army that they had been informed about was in reality an army of 2,000 men, the two sides clashed at the Battle of Bálaga, on the Chitagá River on 25 November, where Calzada was victorious over the republicans. The defeated republican troops were forced to retreat to the town of Cácota, where only 200 troops of the 1,000 strong army had been able to escape the defeat. They were unable to stay long as the Spanish troops were close behind them, forcing Urdaneta to retreat to the provincial capital of Pamplona at 11pm that same night, arriving the next day to the city. Urdaneta and governor Serrano then abandoned the city on November 26, and headed for Matanza, taking with them important documents and weapons to prevent their capture by the Spanish. On November 28, Calzada and his division entered Pamplona triumphantly.

Urdaneta's defeat at Bálaga and the capture of Pamplona by the Spanish shortly after, now meant that any republican force north of the city had their communication and supply lines cut off from the rest of the country. Colonel Francisco de Paula Santander along with his veteran 500 fusiliers of 5th Line battalion of the union who was based in Ocaña, as they had attempted to liberate Mompox from Spanish control were now left stranded as result. With Morillo to the north and Calzada to the south, Santander made the decision to conduct a risky retreat from Ocaña to Piedecuesta, where the rest of the army of the north had been gathering. On December 22, 1815, Santander skillfully withdrew his men south through an abandoned path that led to the town of Girón eventually arriving in Piedecuesta, for leading this skillful retreat Santander received a commendation from the government of the union. There he was able to meet up with Brigadier General Custodio Garcia Rovira who had been named commander of the Army of the North, from there they would attempt to defend the main route that led to the capital of the United Provinces.

== The Battle ==
After defeating Urdaneta in Bálaga and having captured Pamplona, Colonel Sebastián de la Calzada wanting to rest his troops after their long march, decided spend the months of December and January in the city where his army grew to be around 2,200 men in total. Whilst there he requested more uniforms and munitions from royalist headquarters in Maracaibo in neighboring Venezuela.

Meanwhile, in Piedecuesta, Rovira and Santander had gathered around 1,600 fusiliers, 1,400 lancers (on foot), and 100 cavalrymen that had been sent from Tunja, Socorro, and Santafé. General Urdaneta who had been at Piedecuesta was recalled to the capital Santafé to answer for his conduct at the Battle of Bálaga.

Calzada, still garrisoned in Pamplona soon received word of the republican army's presence in Piedecuesta. Seeking to lure them out of their advantageous position, Calzada conducted a feint march north towards Ocaña, as he had received word that royalists troops were approaching that city. Calzada and his army marched towards Ocaña by way of the moorland (Páramo) of Cachirí. During his crossing of the Páramo de Cachirí he left a column of 300 men at the entrance of the Páramo, in order to goad Rovira into responding.

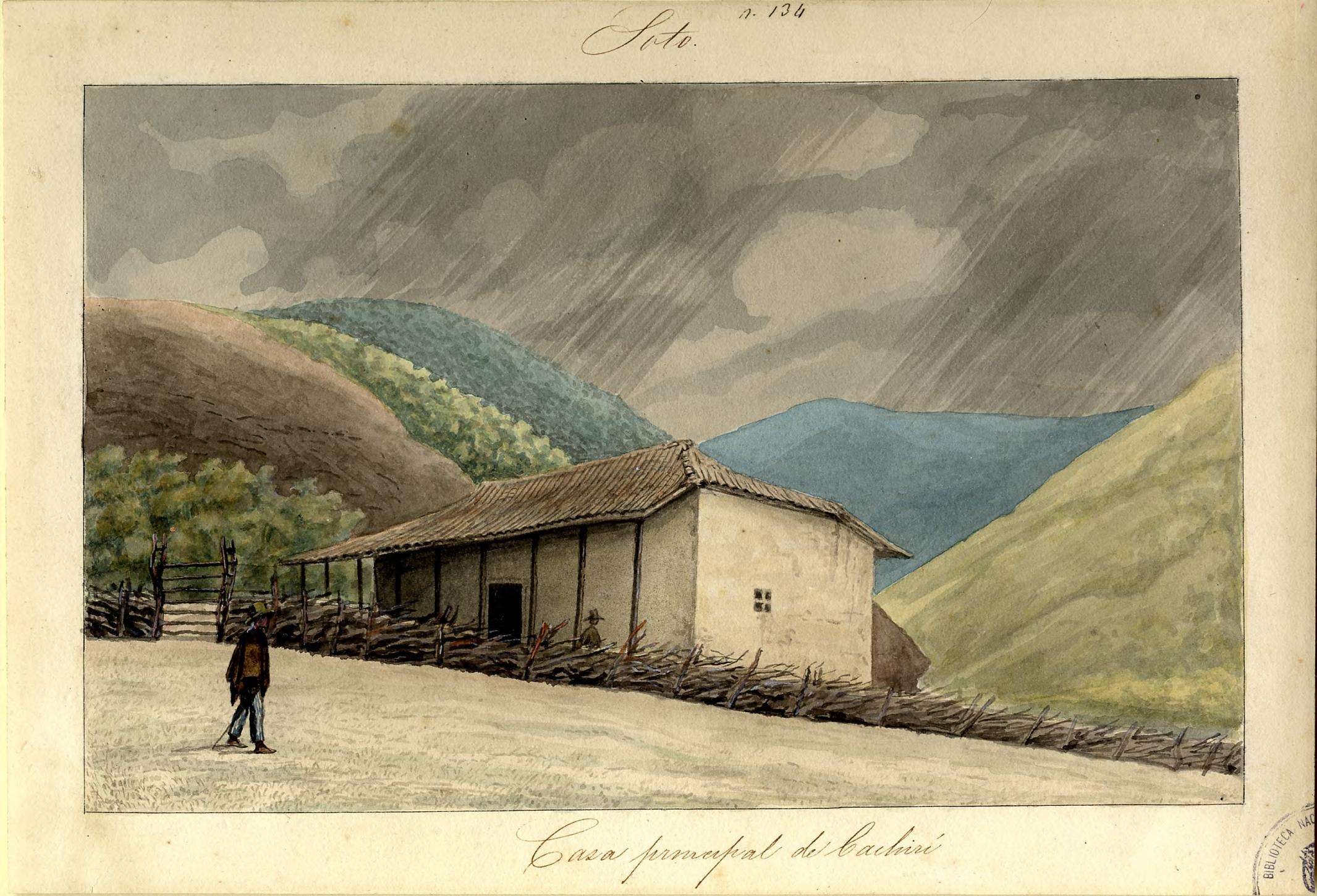
Acuarela painting of the main house of the Cachiri Hacienda made in 1850 by Carmelo Fernandez.

Upon receiving intelligence on the presence of these troops in Cachirí, Rovira went on the offensive, ordering his vanguard to attack the Spanish in the Páramo. On 8 February 1816, the republican vanguard engaged the 300 Spanish troops, after a couple hours of combat the Spanish withdrew in good order, the republican troops attempted to pursue them but lacking sufficient cavalry and munitions were unable to give chase.

Despite this, Rovira was emboldened by this small victory and decided to commit all of his forces in the offensive ordering that the army march from Piedecuesta to Cachirí where he would make his stand. During his march towards the Paramo whilst near the town of Cacota he received word of a group of Spanish troops that were advancing through the Cúcuta valley, these troops were accompanying the supply train that Calzada had requested from Maracaibo. Seeking to deny Calzada of his supplies he ordered that Colonel José María Mantilla take a battalion to intercept them which deducted a sizable number of troops from his army. 8 days later on February 16, Rovira and the bulk of the army were finally positioned the Páramo of Cachiri, where they would defend the road that led to Bucaramanga and the Socorro province. Rovira organized his 2,000 infantrymen and 80 cavalry in three lines of defense with some units placed in advanced positions. Rovira was confident in his defense plan, however his second in command Colonel Santander protested, as he believed that using such strategy with such novice troops who were in the majority armed with lances due to a lack of muskets, was a risky endeavour. Nevertheless Rovira stood firm and decided to make his stand there.

Meanwhile, Calzada who had been expecting reinforcements from the Spanish troops marching down south, received a force of 300 cazadores from the Victoria infantry regiment, chosen among the best of the best expeditionary battalions under the command of Captain Silvestre Llorente.

With these reinforcements, on 20 February 1816 Calzada turned around and countermarched to face the Republicans.

=== February 21 ===
Calzada found the Republican army in the Páramo de Cachirí, on February 21 between the hours of 1pm and 2pm his troops spotted an advanced republican observation force. Calzada then ordered his vanguard now under command of Captain Llorente to attack the observation force. The Spanish troops engaged the republicans and quickly defeated them, forcing the survivors to retreat to the main republican line on the slope of the hill.

The Spanish encouraged by their small victory continued their advance but were however halted in doing so as a dense mountain fog set in preventing them from conducting their attack. At around 5pm the fog lifted and operations resumed, the dense fog had also affected the patriots who had not spotted the Spanish forces until the very last second. With the fog lifted Calzada was then able to observe that Rovira had formed his troops in three defensive lines on the slope of the hill, behind them was the main house of the Cachirí hacienda. The first Numancia battalion which had earlier engaged the advanced republican observation force, then arrived at a small house where they awaited the 2nd Numancia battalion.

With these battalions brought up, Calzada then ordered an assault, instructing his first battalion to conduct a frontal assault and also ordered that the companies of Cazadores from the 1st and 2nd Numancia battalions to attack the republican right flank, which they did successfully. The Spanish attack on the republican right flank caused panic in the republican first line of defense that was only contained thanks to the heroics of Venezuelan Colonel Pedro Arevalo who brought up his battalion to the first line and fended off the Spanish attack. Fighting continued until nightfall arrived which led to a stop in combat between the two sides.

The performance of the Patriot troops on the first day of battle had inspired much confidence in Rovira who decided pull back his forces to another set defensive lines behind the ones they had been occupying during the day.

=== February 22 ===
The next day, Calzada ordered his troops to attack once again. Two fusilier companies and a company of carabiners, advanced forward where they reached the previous Republican positions, that had been abandone, during the night. There they only found a security post that they took prisoner. Encouraged by this, they passed the river and began to climb the hill in whose foothills the republicans had placed a hidden battalion that ambushed the Spanish conducting a volley fire on that killed twenty men and wounded many others.

Meanwhile, Calzada ordered that his right flank under the command of Sergeant Major Matías Escute and his column of cazadores attack the patriot left flank, and ordered his left flank be led by Captain Llorente and his column of cazadores attack the patriot right flank supported by a 4-pounder gun. While these two units conducted their flanking maneuver, he ordered that the grenadier companies of the Numancia and Sagunto battalions under the command of Lt. Colonel Carlos Tolrá conduct a general advance on the republican center while also conducting volley fire on them.

Musket fire was exchanged for more than an hour with the patriots initially able to hold the line; however one of the republican battalions placed in the first trench line: the Santafé battalion began to receive heavy musket and artillery fire from their flanks which resulted in the death of their commanding officer, this led the troops of the Santafé battalion to abandon the trench which quickly fell under control of the Spanish . The Tunja battalion that was placed behind them was supposed to take their place, but they also withdrew as did a 3rd republican battalion that was supposed to continue defending. The withdrawal of these units led to a general disorder which began to take a hold on the patriot troops. The Spanish took advantage of this and their center effort was then given the order to execute a bayonet charge.

With the frontline republican battalions in disorder, Colonel Santander attempted to fend off the attack by ordering his battalion, the 5th battalion of the Union to conduct volley fire on the advancing Spanish units, this battalion put up a heavy fire, but before being able to conduct a second discharge they were swarmed by the fleeing front line battalions. The republican troops became further disorganized as the Spanish infantry clashed with them. Calzada took advantage of the terror and disorder amongst the patriot troops and ordered Captain Antonio Gomez to charge with his cavalry against the patriots. The Spanish cavalry charge further dispersed the disorganized patriot troops which led to a chaotic rout.

The scene soon became a massacre as the Spanish cavalry to the cries of Long live the King! chased and cut down the fleeing patriots, and continued chasing them as far as the town of Matanza where the river prevented them from continuing their chase. In the War diary of the 5th Division, Lt. Colonel Carlos Tolrá described the massacre noting that:"There has never been a more horrible scene than the one presented on the road from Cachirí to Cacotá" as the republican dead and their abandoned supplies littered the road in their desperate attempt to flee their attackers.

General Rovira and Colonel Santander managed to escape the mayhem, followed by only a handful of officers and men.

== Aftermath ==
Cachirí was a serious defeat for the Republicans and effectively destroyed the Army of the North. In his report to Morillo, Calzada estimated that the republicans had lost around 2,000 men in total; with 1,000 being dead along with 500 prisoners; 200 of these being wounded, the other 300 would later be impressed into the Spanish Army. The Spanish also captured "4 battalion standards, 2 artillery pieces, 750 muskets, 300 lances and 45,000 paper cartridges." Calzada was able to continue his advance towards Santafé de Bogotá, which he occupied on 6 May 1816.

News of the defeat reached Santa Fe on February 29, the first political consequences of the defeat were seen on March 7 when Garcia Rovira was relieved of his command and replaced with French born general Manuel Roergas de Serviez as commander of what remained of the Army of the North. President Camilo Torres resigned on March 12 and was replaced by the young José Fernandez Madrid as president of the United Provinces. Republican leaders fled to Popayan, but were again defeated at the Battle of Cuchilla del Tambo on 29 June, which put a definitive end to the First Republic of New Granada.

== Sources ==
- Córdova : gloria y asesinato del héroe. Tomo I / Armando Barona Mesa; prólogo del académico Antonio Cacua Prada
- “García Estrada, Rodrigo, Córdoba-Restrepo, Juan Felipe. (2016) 1816: El terror y la sangre sublime. Bogotá: Editorial Universidad del Externado. ISBN 978-958-738-778-0.
- Mercado, J. (1963). Campaña de Invasión del Teniente General Don Pablo Morillo 1815-1816. Editorial Iris.
- Moreno de Ángel, Pilar (1989) Santander. Bogotá: Editorial Planeta. ISBN 978-958-42-7692-6.

== Links ==
- Universidad Industrial de Santander
- Universidad externado de Colombia
