= Intercontinental de Aviación =

Colombian airline

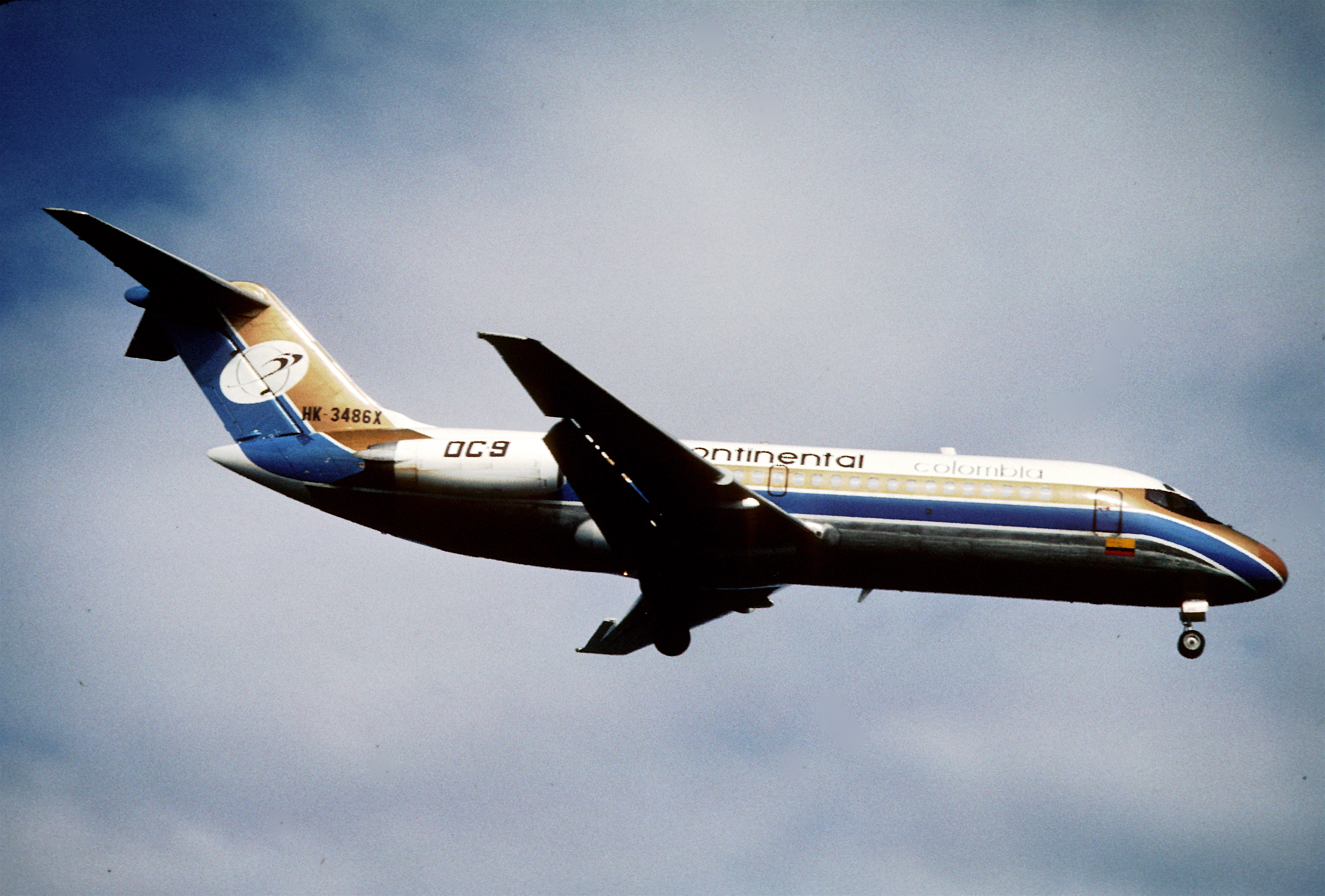
IATA	ICAO	Call sign
RS	ICT	CONTAVIA
- Founded: October 16, 1960 (as Aeropesca)
- Ceased operations: February 2005
- Hubs: El Dorado International Airport
- Secondary hubs: Alfonso Bonilla Aragón International Airport
- Fleet size: 6
- Destinations: 26
- Headquarters: Bogotá, Colombia
- Key people: Luis Alfredo Gallego Ramos (General manager)
- Employees: ~700 (1999)
- Website: www.inter.com.co

Intercontinental de Aviación S.A. (English; lit. 'Intercontinental Aviation' and operated as INTER) was a regional airline based in Bogotá, Colombia. It operated domestic services and flights to neighboring countries. Its main hub was located at El Dorado International Airport in Bogotá, with a secondary hub at Alfonso Bonilla Aragón International Airport in Cali. The airline closed operations in 2005.

== History ==
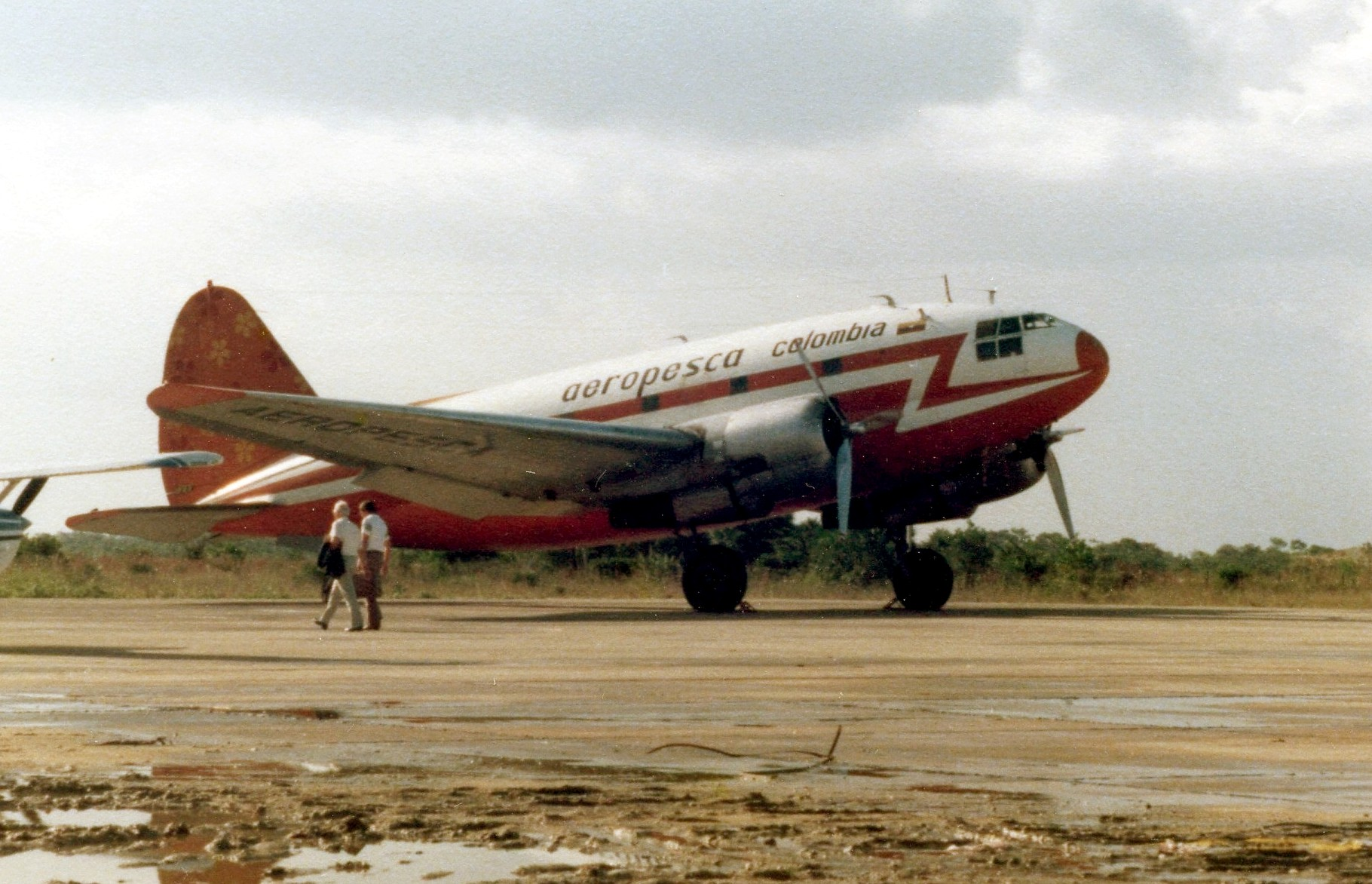
A Curtiss C-46 parked at Philip S. W. Goldson International Airport in 1979

The airline was founded as Aeropesca Colombia on October 16, 1960, initially transporting fish and various goods. Aeropesca began operating charter flights outside of Colombia by 1965, using a Curtiss C-46 Commando. It later ventured into the passenger market in late 1971, using two Vickers Viscounts from Aloha Airlines.

After suffering from several accidents, the airline was sold to a group of shareholders who changed their name and image to Intercontinental de Aviacion in 1982. Only one Vickers Viscount and the Curtiss C-46 operated with the company. A McDonnell Douglas DC-9-15 and another Vickers Viscount were purchased, and on June 3, 1983, it began operating from Bogotá to the west.

After changing shareholders in 1986, Intercontinental consolidated itself as a developing company and became a competitor for Avianca and SAM. The airline began operating international flights in 1991, and more DC-9-15s were acquired, followed by two De Havilland DHC-8s. The Executive Class and VIP lounges began to be offered in Bogotá, Cali, Medellín and Barranquilla.

In March 1999, the Colombian Civil Aviation Authority temporarily suspended Intercontinental's operating certificate due to disputes concerning airport and landing fees. In October 2000, the airline attempted to modernize its fleet by purchasing Beechcraft 1900Ds and two Boeing 737-300s; however, neither type was ever operated.

On October 14, 2004, the U.S. Department of the Treasury revealed that Intercontinental was financed and controlled by members of the Norte del Valle cartel, which led the airline to be blacklisted with links to drug trafficking, along with 14 other bussinesses. The Colombian government seize the airline in February 2005 and permanently immobilized the six aircraft it had at the time.

== Destinations ==
Intercontinental operated scheduled flights to the following cities:

=== National ===
Colombia

- Arauca (Santiago Pérez Quiroz Airport)
- Barranquilla (Ernesto Cortissoz International Airport)
- Bogotá (El Dorado International Airport) Hub
- Bucaramanga (Palonegro International Airport)
- Cali (Alfonso Bonilla Aragón International Airport) Hub
- Cartagena (Rafael Núñez International Airport)
- Corozal (Las Brujas Airport)
- Cúcuta (Camilo Daza International Airport)
- Florencia (Gustavo Artunduaga Paredes Airport)
- Ipiales (San Luis Airport)
- Maicao (Jorge Isaacs Airport)
- Medellín (Olaya Herrera Airport)
- Medellín (José María Córdova International Airport)
- Neiva (Benito Salas Airport)
- Pasto (Antonio Nariño Airport)
- Pereira (Matecaña International Airport)
- Popayán (Guillermo León Valencia Airport)
- Riohacha (Almirante Padilla Airport)
- San Andrés (Gustavo Rojas Pinilla International Airport)
- Tumaco (La Florida Airport)
- Valledupar (Alfonso López Pumarejo Airport)

=== International ===
Cuba

- Habana (José Martí International Airport)

Ecuador

- Esmeraldas (Colonel Carlos Concha Torres Airport)
- Tulcán (Teniente Coronel Luis A. Mantilla International Airport)

Panama

- Panama City (Tocumen International Airport)

Venezuela

- San Antonio del Táchira (Juan Vicente Gómez International Airport)

== Fleet ==
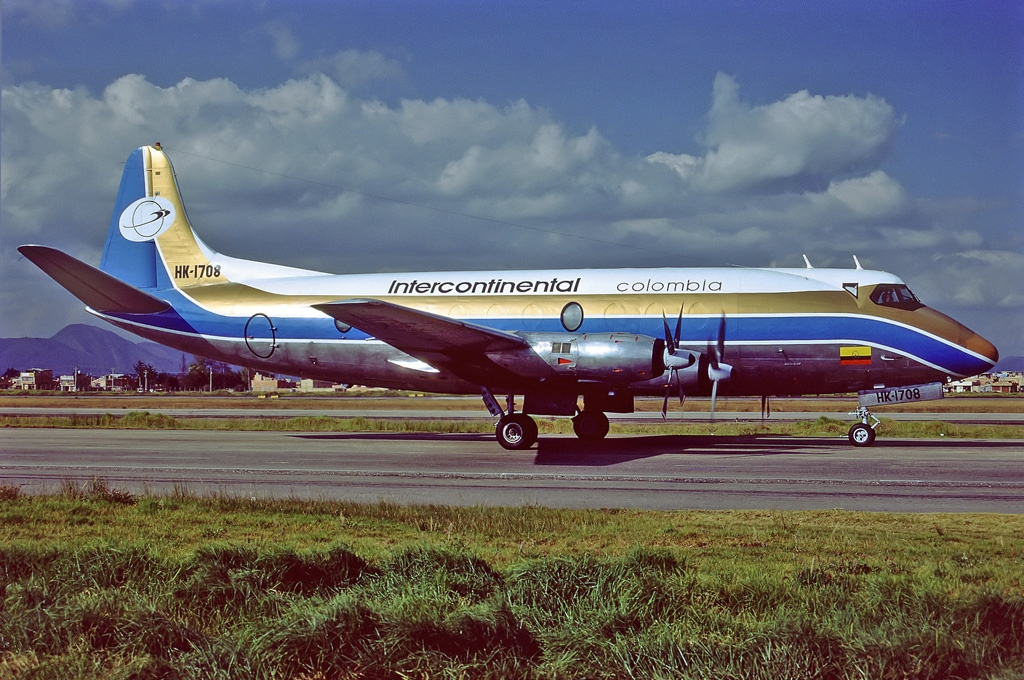
A Vickers Viscount taxiing at El Dorado International Airport in 1991

Aeropesca and Intercontinental consisted of the following fleet:

- Boeing 727-100
- Bombardier Dash 8 Q300
- Consolidated PBY Catalina
- Curtiss C-46 Commando
- Lockheed Model 18 Lodestar
- Lockheed Ventura
- McDonnell Douglas DC-9-15
- Vickers Viscount

== Accidents and incidents ==
- On November 4, 1965, a Consolidated PBY Catalina (registered HK-811) went missing during a domestic flight. Four of the six occupants on board were discovered 9 days later near the Peruvian border.
- On July 11, 1966, a Curtiss C-46 Commando (registration HK-527) went missing over mountainous terrain during a flight from Bogotá to Buenos Aires. The aircraft was carrying eight bulls for an exhibition in Buenos Aires. All 8 occupants on board were killed.
- On January 5, 1974, a Lockheed Model 18 Lodestar (registered HK-1146) had a landing gear failure during takeoff at Bogotá. The aircraft returned to the airport and tried to land; however, the brakes were ineffective, causing it to overshoot the runway and come to rest in a drainage ditch. All 5 occupants on board survived.
- On January 21, 1974, a Vickers Viscount was hijacked and diverted to Cali.
- On August 14, 1978, a Curtiss C-46 Commando (registration HK-1350) flying in worsening weather conditions drifted off course during a flight from Bogotá to Tame and crashed into Mount Paramo de Laura near Tota, Colombia, killing all 18 people on board. Certified to carry only six passengers, it had 15 passengers on board at the time of the crash.
- On August 26, 1981, Aeropesca Flight 221, a Vickers Viscount (registered HK-1320), flew into Mount Santa Elena, killing all 50 people on board.
- On March 26, 1982, Aeropesca Flight 217, a Vickers Viscount (registered HK-2382) flew into a mountain near Quetame while on a flight from La Vanguardia Airport to El Dorado International Airport, killing all 21 people on board.
- On March 31, 1991, a Vickers Viscount (registered HK-1708) was damaged beyond economic repair while on a flight from El Dorado International Airport to Gustavo Rojas Pinilla International Airport. Both artificial horizons failed in turbulence at 16,000 feet (4,900 m). Control of the aircraft was regained at 4,000 feet (1,200 m). and a successful emergency landing was made at Olaya Herrera Airport, Medellín. The lower main spar was found to have cracked. The aircraft had previously suffered a gear collapse on February 14, 1988.
- On January 11, 1995, Intercontinental de Aviación Flight 256, a McDonnell Douglas DC-9-14 (registered HK-3839X), crashed on approach near María La Baja. The accident killed 52 passengers and crew; one person survived the crash.
- On September 14, 1997, a Bombardier Dash 8 Q300 (registered HK-4062X) was on a flight from San Andrés to Pereira, via Bogotá. As the aircraft landed at Matecaña International Airport, the nose and left main undercarriage, followed by the right main undercarriage, collapsed. All 39 passengers and 5 crew members survived. The aircraft was damaged beyond repair and was written off; however, it was preserved at Bojacá on private farmland for ground equipment.
- On June 14, 2002, a DC-9-14 (registered HK-3859X) overshot the runway on landing at Benito Salas Airport. All 65 passengers and 6 crew members survived, while the aircraft was written off.

== See also ==
- List of airlines of Colombia
