= Aeropesca Flight 221 =

1981 plane crash in southern Colombia

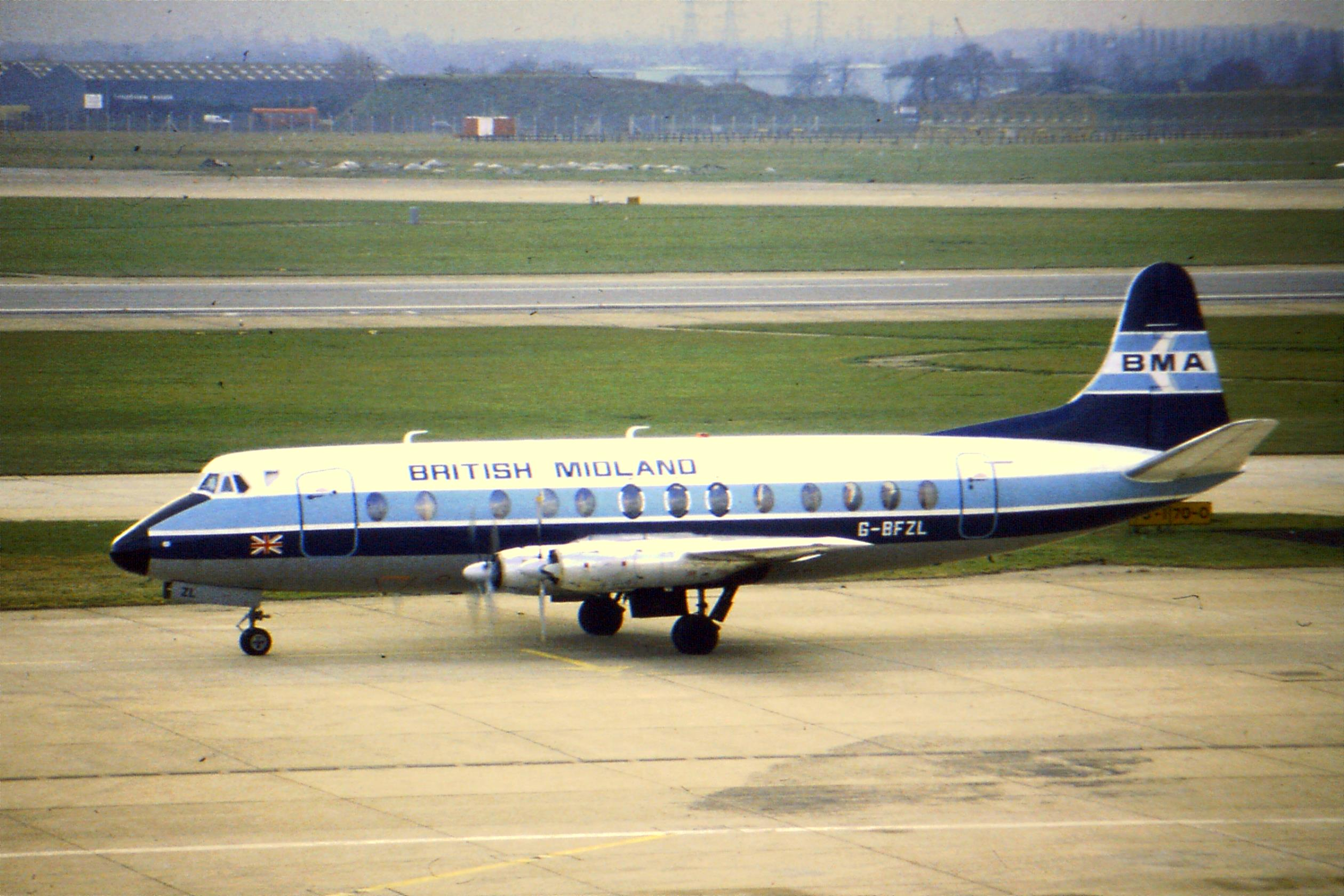
- A Vickers Viscount similar to the accident aircraft

Accident
- Date: 26 August 1981
- Summary: Controlled flight into terrain (CFIT)
- Site: Cerro Matiqui, Colombia; 2.03°N 75.47°W

Aircraft
- Aircraft type: Vickers Viscount 745D
- Aircraft name: Ciudad de Popayana
- Operator: Aeropesca
- Registration: HK-1320
- Flight origin: Florencia-Gustavo Artunduaga Paredes Airport (FLA/SKFL), Florencia, Colombia
- Destination: Neiva Airport, Colombia
- Passengers: 44
- Crew: 6
- Fatalities: 50
- Survivors: 0

Aeropesca Flight 221 was an internal scheduled passenger flight from Florencia Airport to Neiva Airport in Colombia. On 26 August 1981 it was being operated by a Vickers Viscount turboprop airliner registered in Colombia as HK-1320 when it collided with Mount Santa Elana, an Andean mountain peak, destroying the aircraft and killing all 50 on board.

== Investigation ==
The investigation by the Colombian authorities concluded the probable cause was "continuing VFR in meteorological conditions below the minimum laid down in the Manual of Colombian air routes".

== Aircraft ==
The aircraft was a four-engined Vickers Viscount 745D turboprop airliner registered HK-1320 with Vickers construction number 112, it first flew on 22 February 1956 in the United Kingdom and was delivered to Capital Airlines in the United States on 3 March 1956. After service with Capital, Austrian Airlines and Aloha Airlines it was bought by Aeropesca in 1971.
