= Chinauta =

Town in Cundinamarca, Colombia

Chinauta is Corregimientos of Colombia of the municipality of Fusagasugá in the department of Cundinamarca in Colombia.
