= Battle of La Plata (1816) =

- Part of Spanish reconquest of New Granada of the Colombian War of Independence
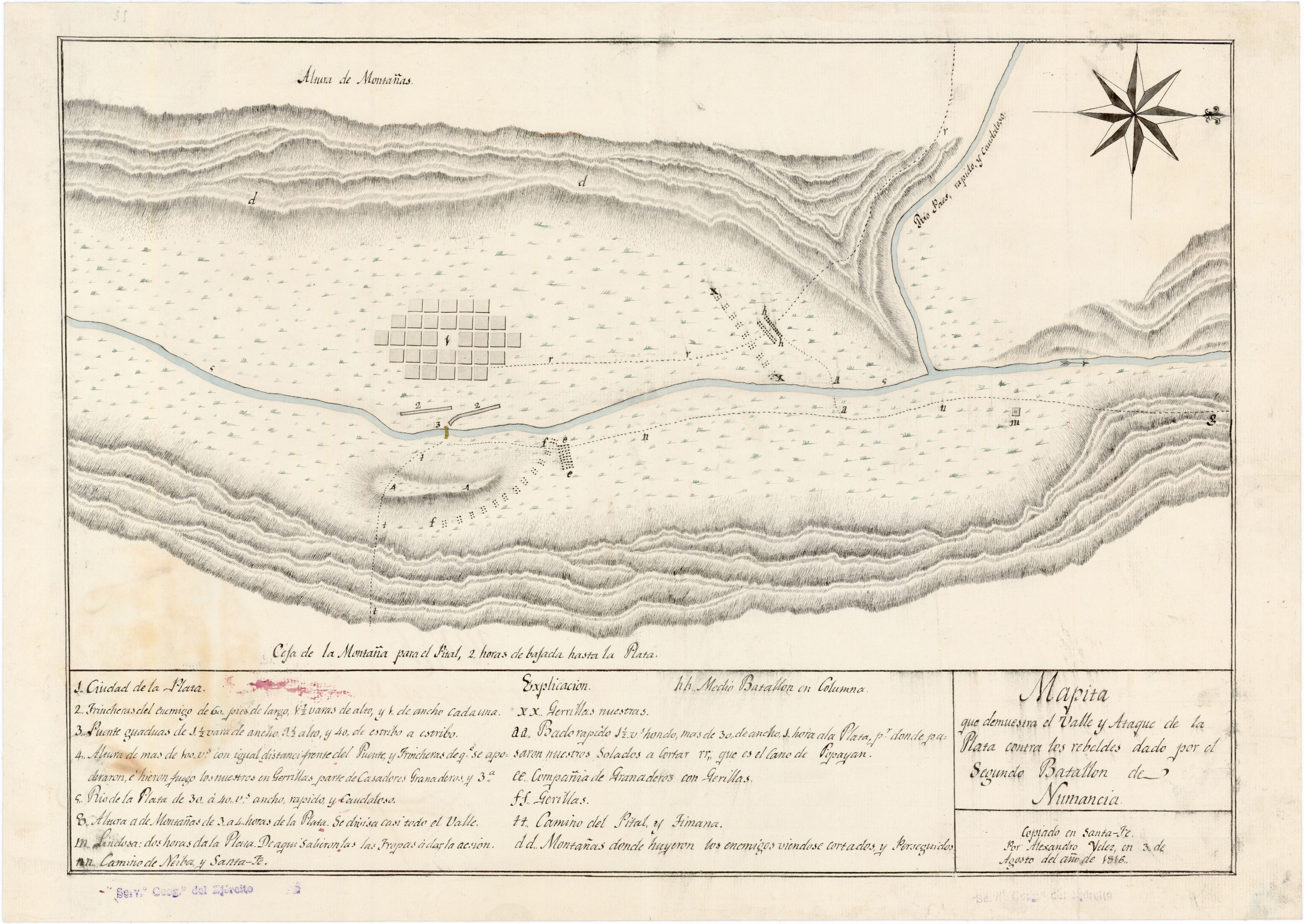
- Spanish map detailing the action made in 1816 titled Map showing the Valley and Attack of La Plata against the rebels given by the Second Battalion of Numancia.
Date	July 10, 1816 (210 years ago)
Location	La Plata, Neiva Province, United Provinces of New Granada
Result	Spanish victory: Destruction of the army of the union; End of the first republic; Reestablishment of Spanish control of New Granada

Belligerents
Kingdom of Spain	United Provinces of New Granada

Commanders and leaders
(Spain) Carlos Tolrá	Liborio Mejía (POW); Pedro Monsalve (POW)

Strength
400 troops	150 troops

Casualties and losses
Light	60 killed 56 captured Large number of weapons and ammunition captured

The Battle of La Plata was an action of the Colombian War of Independence fought on July 10, 1816, at and near the town of La Plata in the Neiva Province of New Granada (now Huila Department, Colombia). In this action the Spanish Army under the command of Lt. Colonel Carlos Tolrá defeated the remnants of the southern army of the Union under the command of President Liborio Mejía of the United Provinces of New Granada. It was the last major military engagement of the Spanish Recoqnuest of New Granada and signified the end of the first republic and the reestablishment of Spanish rule over New Granada.

== Background ==
After the fall of Cartagena de Indias in December 1815, the relentless advance of General Pablo Morillo's Spanish troops into the interior of New Granada seemed unstoppable. His colonels, Warleta, Calzada, Santa Cruz, Torre, and Bayer, had seized key provinces by mid 1816, paving the way for Morillo's triumphant entry into the capital, Santafé de Bogotá on May 26.

In this critical context, Lt, Colonel Liborio Mejía, commander of the southern army of the Union garrisoned in Popayán, assumed the presidency of New Granada when President José Fernández Madrid resigned upon arriving to Popayán, having fled the capital. In June of 1816, Mejia set out to halt the advance of Spanish Brigadier Juan de Sámano who was marching from Pasto with an army of 2,000 men. However, his southern army was virtually annihilated at the Battle of Cuchilla del Tambo on June 29. Mejía, with his last remaining men, managed to escape capture and fled to the town of La Plata while Sámano occupied Popayán on July 1.

In La Plata, Mejía joined forces with the remnants of the Socorro battalion, led by Colonel Pedro Monsalve, who had escaped from Bogotá before its capture by the royalists. The combined patriot forces barely numbered 150 men.

Shortly thereafter, the patriots received news that 400 soldiers of the 2nd Numancia battalion, under the command of Lieutenant Colonel Carlos Tolrá, were heading to La Plata to confront them. Faced with this threat, the patriots decided to entrench themselves at the La Plata River, west of the city. To this end, they deployed their troops in improvised parapets at the entrance of a wooden bridge over the river, using the bridge's own planks as protection and leaving only the guadua (bamboo) structure, which prevented the passage of large groups.

== Battle ==
Colonel Tolrá, upon arriving with his detachment and learning of the measures taken by the patriot forces, ordered three companies; Cazadores, Grenadiers and the 3rd Company under the command of Captain Juan Francisco Capdevila, to attack from the front to distract the enemy, while he crossed the river with the rest of his troops to surprise them from the rear.

The battle began at 11 a.m., the outnumbered patriots concentrated their efforts on the defense on the bridge, which allowed Tolrá to find a ford and cross the river, although some of his men drowned in the attempt. Faced with the simultaneous attack from both fronts, the independentists were forced to abandon their fortifications and attempted to escape towards Popayán, crossing enemy lines.

The royalist troops attacking from the front crossed the bamboo bridge and, and launched a bayonet charge, which further disorganized the patriots, causing their dispersal. The battle was intense and bloody and many bodies fell into the river, the fighting was concluded by nightfall. Some patriots managed to escape the site, for which Tolrá ordered the 4th company to pursue them.

== Aftermath ==
In the days following the battle, the last patriots who had managed to escape were captured by the company Tolrá had sent in pursuit. Among those captured were President Mejía, Colonel Monsalve, and several other officers. According to the report given by Colonel Tolrá to General Morillo regarding the action, the Spanish commander estimated that the patriots had suffered around 60 deaths and that 56 prisoners had fallen into his hands. The Spanish also captured a flag and a large quantity of war material consisting of 9 boxes of cartridges, each with 1,000 cartridges; 2 boxes of 4-pound cannon cartridges, and bulk gunpowder; 86 loose packages; 4,000 flints; 119 rifles; 140 bayonets; 4 war drums; 2 iron bars and a tent. The battle marked the annihilation of the Socorro battalion, this being the last unit of the Army of the Union to succumb to the Spanish invasion.

On July 30, the prisoners were taken to Santafé where their sentences were handed down. President Mejía was executed on September 3, 1816, under the charge of treason by order of General Pablo Morillo and Field Marshal Juan Sámano at the age of 24, while Colonel Monsalve was taken to El Socorro and was executed by firing squad facing backwards along with his brother Juan José on September 3 in the town square by express order of General Morillo. While the rest of the other prisoners were either pardoned, imprisoned, or were forced to serve in the ranks of the Spanish army.

The defeat marked the end of the United Provinces of New Granada and the return of Spanish rule over New Granada, this period would see hundreds of officials, officers, and sympathizers of the first republic executed or imprisoned by the Spanish during the following year. The royalists managed to eliminate all resistance, except for the few army units that managed to escape to the Casanare plains, whose survival would be decisive for the subsequent development of the war.
