= Intercontinental de Aviación Flight 256 =

1995 aviation accident in Colombia

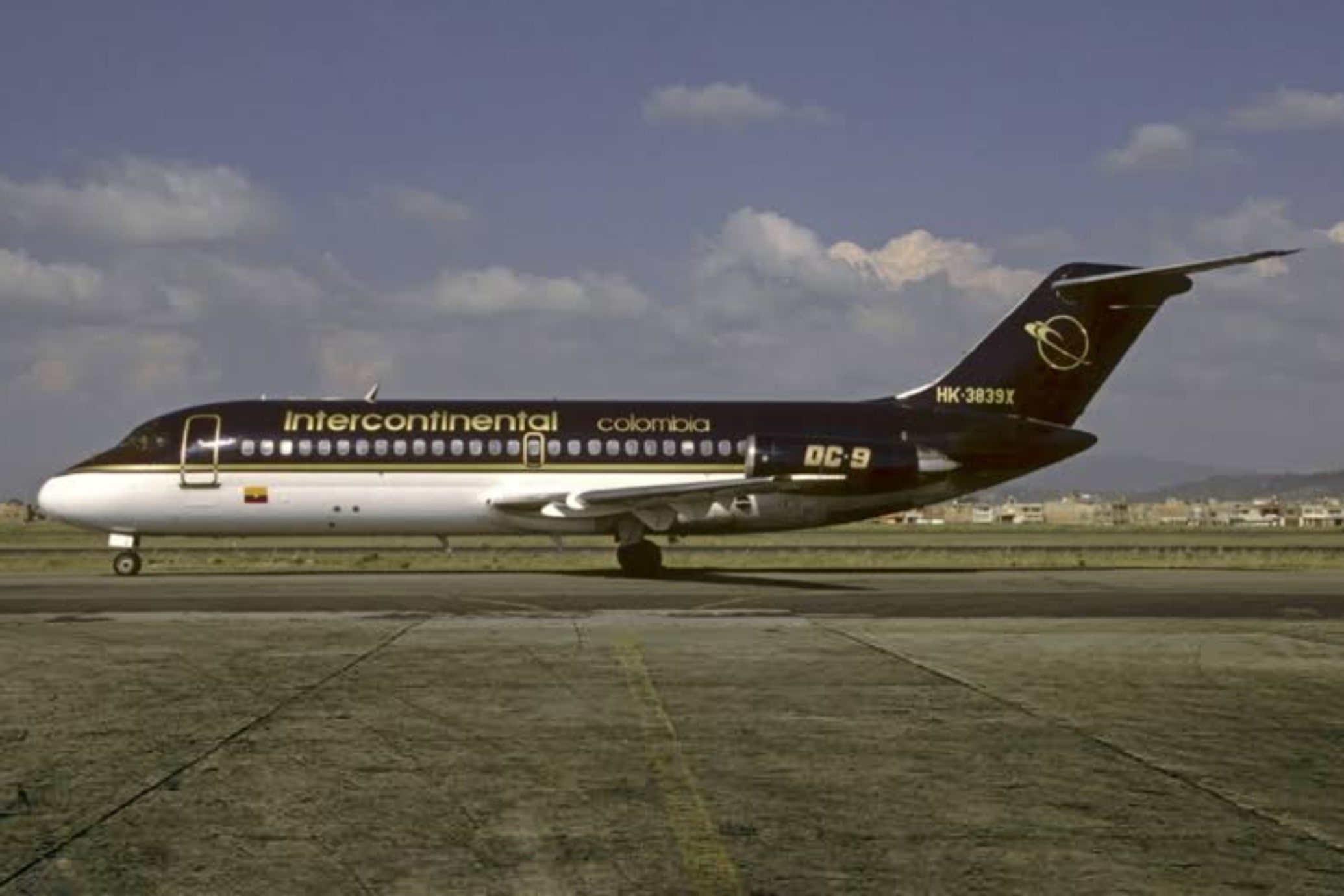
- HK-3839X, the aircraft involved, seen one day before the accident

Accident
- Date: 11 January 1995
- Summary: Controlled flight into terrain due to altimeter failure and pilot error
- Site: María La Baja, near Rafael Núñez International Airport, Cartagena, Colombia; 9.9833°N 75.3500°W

Aircraft
- Aircraft type: McDonnell Douglas DC-9-14
- Operator: Intercontinental de Aviación
- IATA flight No.: RS256
- ICAO flight No.: ICT256
- Call sign: INTER 256
- Registration: HK-3839X
- Flight origin: El Dorado International Airport, Bogotá, Colombia
- Destination: Rafael Núñez International Airport, Cartagena, Colombia
- Occupants: 52
- Passengers: 47
- Crew: 5
- Fatalities: 51
- Injuries: 1
- Survivors: 1

Intercontinental de Aviación Flight 256 was a scheduled flight from El Dorado International Airport, Bogotá, on a service to Rafael Núñez International Airport, Cartagena, and San Andrés. On 11 January 1995, the McDonnell Douglas DC-9-14 operating the flight flew into the ground during its approach to Cartagena Airport, killing all but one of the 52 people on board. The sole survivor was a nine-year old girl who sustained minor injuries.

== Aircraft and crew ==
The aircraft involved was a McDonnell Douglas DC-9-14 that had its maiden flight on 15 February 1966. On 29 April 1993, the aircraft was transferred to Intercontinental de Aviación, where the aircraft was re-registered as HK-3839X. The aircraft was almost 29 years old and had 65,084 flight hours and 69,716 take-off and landing cycles at the time of the crash.

The captain of flight 256 was Andrés Patacón (39), and the first officer was Luis Ríos (36). In the cabin there were three flight attendants: Claudia Duarte, Dalia Mora and Zaida Tarazona. On board were 47 passengers, all of whom were Colombians.

== Crash ==
The flight was scheduled to depart at 12:10 but was delayed due to a failure on the previous flight. The flight eventually departed at 18:45. The aircraft climbed to flight level (FL) 310 (31,000 ft (9,400 m)) at 19:09.

During the approach to Cartagena, the air traffic control center in Barranquilla cleared flight 256 to descend to FL 140 (14,000 ft (4,300 m)) and report when passing FL 200 (20,000 ft (6,100 m)) at 19:26. The aircraft passed through FL 200 at 19:33. The last radio contact occurred when the flight was cleared further down to 8,000 ft (2,400 m).

At 19:38, the crew of Aerocorales flight 209, operated by a Cessna Caravan aircraft, contacted the controllers. The crew reported that they had seen the lights of a rapidly descending aircraft, followed by an explosion on the ground. The plane impacted with the ground in a marshy lagoon near María La Baja, 56 km (35 mi; 30 nmi) from Cartagena Airport. The plane exploded on impact and broke into three parts. 51 people were killed: 46 out of the 47 passengers and all 5 crew members.

The sole survivor of the crash was a nine-year-old girl named Erika Delgado. She was flying with her parents and younger brother, who were killed in the crash. The girl's injuries were just a few bumps and bruises, most serious being a broken arm. She stated that her mother survived the initial impact and pushed her aside into a vegetable pile to shield her away from the fire. The girl was found by one of the local residents who came running to the rescue. She explained that there was looting at the crash site and that one of the looters stole a necklace which was given to her by her father. The looting was later confirmed, and the girl asked that the necklace be returned to her, but this was unsuccessful.

== Investigation ==
Since the crew of the Cessna reported an explosion, first suspicions arose about a terrorist attack, similar to the bombing of Avianca Flight 203 in 1989. However, investigators determined that the plane exploded when it hit the ground, and no traces of explosives were found. The probable cause of the crash was a wrong setting of the altimeter. Altimeter number 1 indicated 16,200 ft (4,900 m) on impact. Altimeter number 2 (the first officer's) worked normally, but its lights did not work, and therefore the crew could not compare their readings. Other contributing factors were the lack of radar observation in the area and the flight crew's loss of situational awareness (due to the clear weather relaxing them), as well as the airline's insufficient training of crews in this situation. In addition, it was not possible to determine whether the ground proximity warning system functioned properly, or if the crew was unable to respond to it in time, as the cockpit voice recorder (CVR) was inoperative at the time of the accident.

== See also ==
- List of aviation accidents and incidents with a sole survivor
