= Eduardo Falla Solano Airport =

Eduardo Falla Solano Airport Aeropuerto Nacional Eduardo Falla Solano
- IATA: SVI; ICAO: SKSV

Summary
- Airport type: Public
- Owner: Aerocivil
- Serves: San Vicente del Caguán, Colombia
- Elevation AMSL: 883 ft / 269 m
- Coordinates: 2°09′05″N 74°45′55″W

Map
- Location of airport in Colombia

Runways
Direction	Length		Surface
Direction	m	ft	Surface
14/32	1,500	4,921	Asphalt
- Sources: GCM

Eduardo Falla Solano Airport (IATA: SVI, ICAO: SKSV) in is a domestic airport serving the municipality of San Vicente del Caguán in the Caquetá Department of Colombia.

== Airlines and destinations ==
Airlines	Destinations
SATENA	Araracuara, Bogotá, Neiva

== Accidents and incidents ==
On 17 October 1971, Douglas C-47A HK-595 of Aerolíneas TAO crashed on take-off, killing 19 of 21 people on board. The aircraft was operating a domestic non-scheduled passenger flight although it was only certified to carry freight and three crew. It was also overloaded by 311 kilograms (686 lb).

== See also ==
- Transport in Colombia
- List of airports in Colombia
