= Aeropesca Flight 217 =

1982 aviation accident

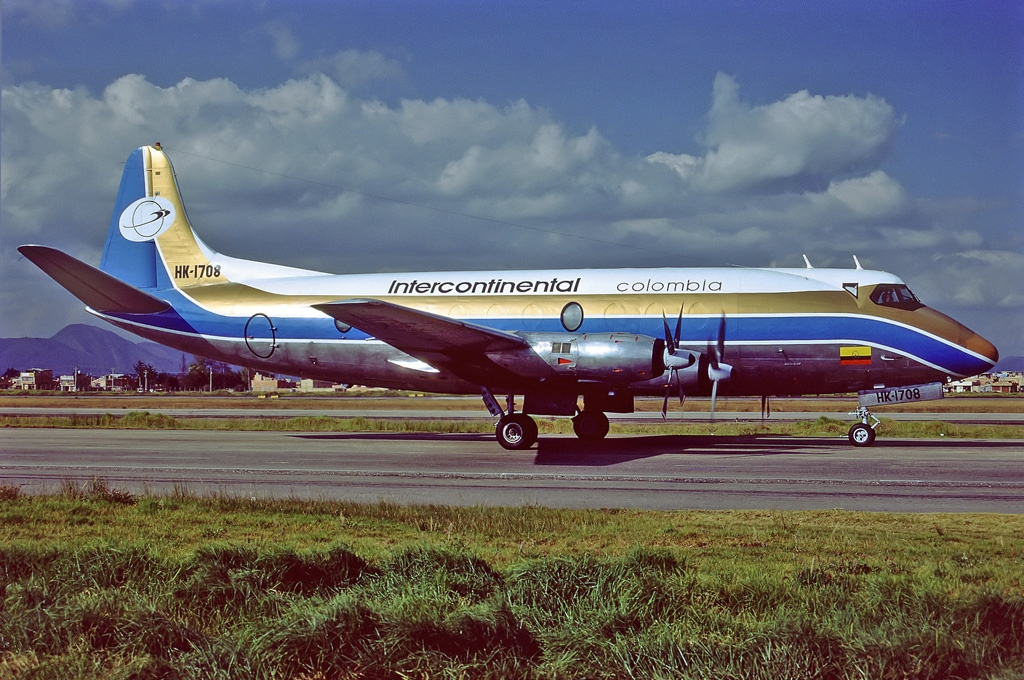
- Sister-ship to the accident aircraft in a later Intercontinental Colombia livery

Accident
- Date: 26 March 1982
- Summary: Controlled flight into terrain
- Site: Quetame, Colombia; 4°20′35″N 73°45′0″W

Aircraft
- Aircraft type: Vickers Viscount 745D
- Operator: Aeropesca
- Registration: HK-2382
- Flight origin: La Vanguardia Airport, Villavicencio, Colombia
- Destination: El Dorado International Airport, Bogotá, Colombia
- Occupants: 21
- Passengers: 15
- Crew: 6
- Fatalities: 21
- Survivors: 0

Aeropesca Flight 217 was a domestic scheduled passenger flight in Colombia from La Vanguardia Airport, Villavicencio to El Dorado International Airport, Bogotá. On 26 March 1982 the flight was operated by a four-engined Vickers Viscount turboprop registered HK-2382 which collided with a mountain at 7,700 feet 130 km south east from Bogotá near Quetame in bad weather. The storm hampered rescue attempts. All 21 on board were killed.

== Aircraft ==
The aircraft was a Vickers Viscount 745D four-engined turboprop that had been built in the United Kingdom in 1956 for Capital Airlines of the United States. First flown on 15 December 1956 it was bought by Aeropesca in March 1976.

== Accident ==
At 3:25PM, Flight 217 departed from La Vanguardia Airport to El Dorado International Airport. Mid-flight, the aircraft crashed into a mountain at an altitude of 7,700 feet (2,300 m) as it approached Bogota. Later at 5PM, a declaration of emergency was made after contact with the airliner was lost.

== Crew ==
The flight was under the command of Roberto Alfonso Simbaqueva (46) and co-pilot Alberto Leyva Garces (25). Including 4 unknown cabin crew.
