= Fernando Serrano =

Neogranadine statesman, lawyer and officer

Manuel Fernando Serrano Uribe
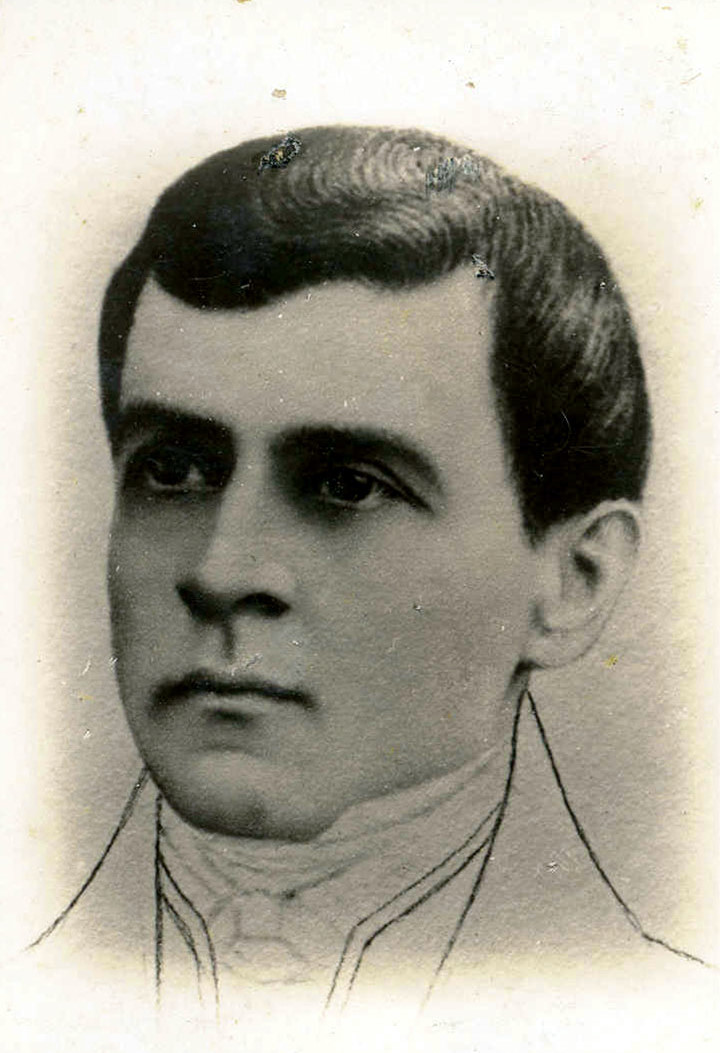

President of the United Provinces of the New Granada
- In office July 16, 1816 – September 16, 1816
- Preceded by: Custodio García Rovira
- Succeeded by: Abolished

Personal details
- Born: May 30, 1789 Cácota de Matanza, Viceroyalty of the New Granada
- Died: February 15, 1819 (aged 29) Ciudad Guayana, Captaincy General of Venezuela
- Spouse: Rosa Calderón Estrada

Manuel Fernando Serrano Uribe (May 30, 1789 – February 15, 1819) was a Neogranadine statesman, lawyer, and officer who became Governor of the Province of Pamplona and wrote its Constitution in 1815. He also served as the last President of the United Provinces of the New Granada before its dissolution and complete Reconquista.

== Early life ==
Serrano was born in the home of don Pedro Javier Serrano y Durán and doña Antonia de Uribe y Mantilla, in Cácota de Matanza, on May 30, 1789. Son of an influential family of Girón, Santander. Serrano grew up in Girón and in Piedecuesta, where his family owned a House of Commerce. He was sent to finish his studies in Santafé de Bogotá in the Our Lady of the Rosary University where he graduated with a Doctorate in Law. Upon his return to Pamplona he met Rosa Calderón Estrada, daughter of a noble and rich family of Girón, with whom he falls in love and gets married.

== Governor of Pamplona ==
Serrano was recruited to join the Independence Movement that was growing in the region, and on July 4, 1810, these forces deposed the then governor of the Province of Girón Juan Bastús y Faya and the province was incorporated to the Province of Pamplona, which was composed of the territories of Pamplona, Cúcuta, Salazar, Bucaramanga and Piedecuesta. Serrano was elected as Speaker of the Supreme Junta, making it his first job in the public service. When the Junta was dissolved, he joined the Republican Army where he was sent in special missions commanding battalions to face the Royalist Army. In 1812 he is named Commander of the Army and fought in the siege of Mensulí (in what is now Floridablanca). This successful siege gave control of Girón and Bucaramanga, to the Republicans.

Months later, The Captain Governor of the Province of Pamplona, José Gabriel Peña Valencia, stepped down, and Serrano, was designated to succeed him, becoming the third governor of the young province.

In 1815, Serrano convened an assembly to review the Constitution of the Province, and on May 17, The legislation approved the Constitution, written by him. The Constitution was very liberal in nature; the most liberal of them called for the abolition of slavery.

== Spanish Invasion ==
In November 1815, the Spanish forces had invaded Pamplona, making their way from Venezuela. Serrano’s forces were overpowered, and even with the help of Gregor MacGregor and Francisco de Paula Santander. Serrano was forced to flee Pamplona, selling all his positions and leaving his family behind, and join the army to protect the country.

Serrano’s wife, Rosa Calderón Estrada, and their four children, Silvestre, Francisca, Juan Estanislao and Rudecinda, the oldest of only eight years of age, had to flee Pamplona. They fled to Bogotá, where one of Rosá’s cousins lived in a convent; unfortunately she was recognized, captured and imprisoned.

== Presidency ==
After the capture of the president Custodio García Rovira on July 10, 1816, the country had no leader; this caused repeated defeats and confused the troops, giving a clear advantage to the enemy. General Manuel Valdez assembled the leaders of the different fronts of resistance in Arauca. This assembly choose Serrano as a clear leader giving its education and bravery on the field, he was elected on July 16 as the new president, the assembly also choose Francisco de Paula Santander as the commanding general of the armies.

His mandate however, was short lived; two months later, the Venezuelan forces decided to take charge of what was left of the armies, the Presidency was obsolete, there was no country left to preside over, most of the country was taken over by the Spanish armies. On September 16, 1816, General José Antonio Páez of the Venezuelan army, arrived in Casanare, he was charged with taking control of the Casanare front, and the generals present helped him depose Serrano. Serrano was by no means offended, as he understood the situation; instead, he took up arms and fought for him. Páez years later recognized his service and bravery and his service to the cause in his memoirs.

== Final Independence ==
Serrano continued serving in the army and in 1819, after the victory of Simón Bolívar over the Spanish, Serrano was summoned to participate in the Congress of Angostura as a delegate. Serrano, who was gravely wounded, accepted and traveled to Ciudad Bolívar to participate in this historic event. Unfortunately for him, he was in bad condition, and succumbed to his wounds on February 15, 1819, in Ciudad Guayana. He died at the age of 29.

== See also ==
- Reconquista (Spanish America)
- Gran Colombia
- Pamplona
