= Communes of Medellín =

Communes of Medellín Comunas de Medellín
- Website: www.medellin.gov.co

The urban area of Medellín, Colombia is divided into six zones, which in turn are divided into 16 communes. Communes are then divided into neighborhoods (Spanish: barrios) and institutional areas. The city has 249 neighborhoods and 20 institutional areas. Institutional areas are large sectors with some neighborhood characteristics, but its populations are not permanent and lack housing. An example of an institutional area is a university campus.

The rural areas of Medellín are divided into 5 corregimientos, these in turn are divided into villages. The districts San Antonio de Prado and San Cristóbal are the most populous districts Colombia, with over thirty thousand inhabitants each. Medellín is structured following the flow of the Medellín River, which runs from south to north.

The six zones and 16 communes are the following:

- Zone 1 - Northeast
  - Commune 1 - Popular
  - Commune 2 - Santa Cruz
  - Commune 3 - Manrique
  - Commune 4 - Aranjuez
- Zone 2 - Northwest
  - Commune 5 - Castilla
  - Commune 6 - Doce de octubre
  - Commune 7 - Robledo
- Zone 3 - Center east
  - Commune 8 - Villa Hermosa
  - Commune 9 - Buenos Aires
  - Commune 10 - La Candelaria
- Zone 4 - Center west
  - Commune 11 - Laureles—Estadio
  - Commune 12 - La América
  - Commune 13 - San Javier
- Zone 5 - Suroriental
  - Commune 14 - El Poblado
- Zone 6 - Suroccidental
  - Commune 15 - Guayabal
  - Commune 16 - Belén
