= Corregimientos of Colombia =

Administrative territorial entity of Colombia

Corregimientos of Medellín City.

In Colombia, under the country’s territorial organization framework, municipal councils may grant administrative functions to population centers located away from—or not integrated into—the municipal seat (such as Population centers and Veredas). These functions are carried out by a Local Administrative Board (Junta Administradora Local, or JAL). This intermediate administrative unit is known as a Corregimiento. The JAL submits a shortlist of three candidates for the appointment of the corregidor (the official in charge of the *corregimiento*).

== See also ==
- Communes of Medellín
