= Guayabal (Medellín) =

Commune of Medellín, Antioquia, Colombia

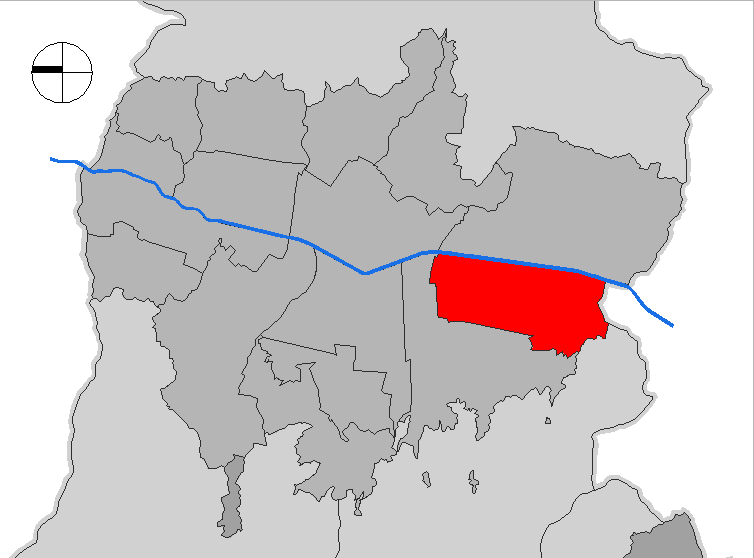
Guayabal-Medellín

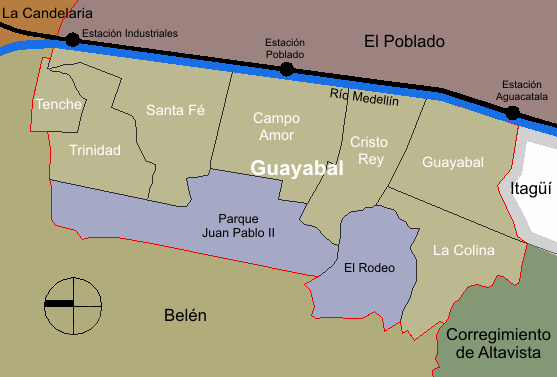
Map of Guayabal-Medellín

Guayabal is the 15th commune in the metropolitan area of the city of Medellín, Colombia.

It is the city's 2nd least populated commune with 94,960 inhabitants as of 2016. Its eastern boundary with the comuna of El Poblado runs along the Medellín River; to the south, it borders the city of Itagüí and to the west and to the north, the comune of Belén.
