= Liborio Mejía =

Colombian colonel and politician

Liborio Mejía Gutiérrez
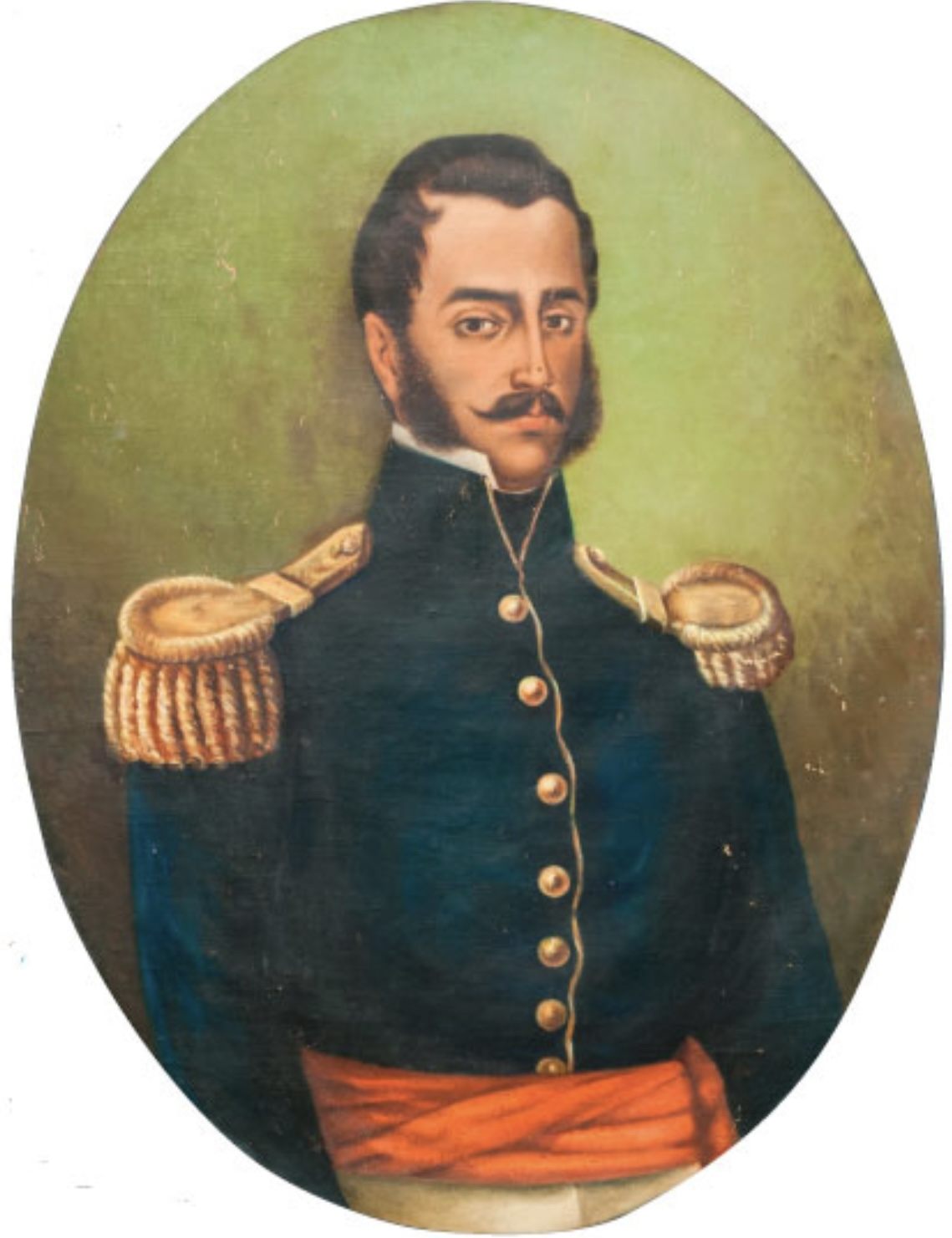
- Liborio Mejía Gutiérrez, oil on canvas, anonymous, 1821. Casa de la Convención Museum, Rionegro, Antioquia.

President of the United Provinces of the New Granada*
- In office June 22, 1816 – June 30, 1816
- Preceded by: José Fernández Madrid
- Succeeded by: Custodio García Rovira

Vice President of the United Provinces of the New Granada
- In office June 30, 1816 – July 10, 1816
- President: Custodio García Rovira

Personal details
- Born: July 28, 1792 Rionegro, Antioquia
- Died: September 3, 1816 (aged 24) Santafé, Viceroyalty of New Granada
- Education: Colegio Mayor de San Bartolomé

Military service
- Allegiance: United Provinces of New Granada
- Branch/service: Army of the Union
- Years of service: 1813-1816
- Rank: Lieutenant Colonel
- Unit: Antioquía Army,
- Commands: Antioquía Battalion, Army of the South
- Battles/wars: Colombian War of Independence: Battle of the Palo River; Battle of Cuchilla del Tambo; Battle of La Plata
- Youngest person to hold the presidency of the Colombia

Liborio Mejía Gutiérrez (July 28, 1792 – September 3, 1816) was a Colombian colonel and politician during the struggle for Independence from Spain, and in 1816, at the age of 24, Liborio Mejía became president of the United Provinces of the New Granada, making him the youngest person to ever hold the presidency of Colombia. He was executed three months later during the Reconquista led by the Spaniard Pablo Morillo.

== Early life ==
Mejía, son of José Antonio Mejía y María Gutiérrez, was born on July 28, 1792, in Rio Negro, in the province of Antioquia, in the Viceroyalty of New Granada in what is now Colombia. He studied in the Colegio Mayor de San Bartolomé between 1808 and 1812 in Santafé de Bogotá. Upon his return to Medellín, he taught philosophy in the Colegio Provincial, in what is now the University of Antioquia. He studied and worked with Francisco José de Caldas on the defense plans for Antioquia from the royalist’s Reconquista.

From 1813 he got involved in the fight for independence, joining Antioquia's provincial army under the command of colonel José María Gutiérrez. In a short time he was made colonel and put in charge of the garrison unit in Popayán.

== Political and military life ==
Facing the resignation of president José Fernández Madrid on June 22, 1816, the Permanent Commission of Congress, then assembled in Popayán, named in his place, general Custodio García Rovira as president of the United Provinces, and colonel Mejía as vice-president. Mejía, however, had to assume the Presidency with the dictatorship powers bestowed to the president by Congress, because García Rovira was unable to assume the presidency at the time.

His presidency was short lived, he had only time to assemble a War Council in which it was decided to assemble a 600 manned army led by Mejía and head south and face the forces of Juan Sámano. Mejía faced Sámano in the Battle of Cuchilla del Tambo which culminated with the defeat of the patriots on June 29. Mejía escaped to the town of La Plata where he ceded his presidential powers to Custodio García Rovira, thus assuming the vice presidency as first intended.

A detachment Spanish army, this time at the command of Lieutenant Colonel Carlos Toirá, caught up to colonel Mejía in La Plata. Mejia had only 150 troops at his disposal but decided to resist this Spanish force. The Battle of La Plata occurred on July 10, 1816, but Mejia's forces were vastly outnumbered, resulting in the final defeat for Mejía and the last troops of the neogranadine Army of the Union. Mejía was able to escape but a few days later was captured.

Made prisoner of war, he was transferred to Bogotá, where on September 3, 1816, Mejía, was executed for treason under orders of Pablo Morillo and Juan Sámano, along with other founding fathers, who later became known collectively as the Martyrs of Independence. With the defeat of Mejía at Cuchilla del Tambo, the Reconquista was established. Mejía died at the age of 25, single and with no children.

== See also ==
- Custodio García Rovira
- Pablo Morillo
