= Benito Salas Airport =

Benito Salas Airport Aeropuerto Benito Salas
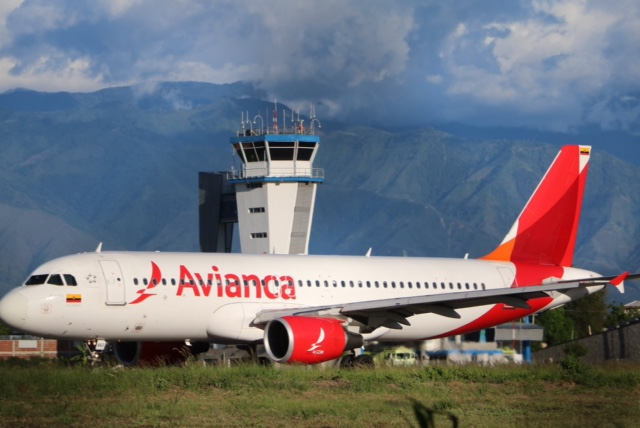
- IATA: NVA; ICAO: SKNV

Summary
- Airport type: Public
- Operator: Government
- Serves: Neiva, Colombia
- Elevation AMSL: 1,482 ft / 452 m
- Coordinates: 2°57′00″N 75°17′39″W

Map
- Location of airport in Colombia

Runways
Direction	Length		Surface
Direction	m	ft	Surface
02/20	1,865	6,119	Asphalt
- Source: WAD GCM

Benito Salas Airport (Spanish: Aeropuerto Benito Salas, IATA: NVA, ICAO: SKNV) is an airport that serves the city of Neiva, the capital of the Huila Department in Colombia. It was named after Benito Salas Vargas, a military and social leader during Colombia's (then known as New Granada) independence war (1810–1819).

The airport is in a rebuilding process that includes a new control tower and a new building with garages. It was formerly known as "La Manguita airport" because it is placed in an old ranch with that name; even today people call it "La Manguita".

== Airlines and destinations ==
Airlines	Destinations
Avianca	Bogotá
Clic	Bogotá, Cali
LATAM Colombia	Bogotá
SATENA	Cali, San Vicente del Caguan

== Accidents and incidents ==
- On 8 January 1975, Douglas DC-3 FAC-688 of SATENA crashed shortly after take-off on a flight to Gustavo Artunduaga Paredes Airport, Florencia. All 30 people on board died.

== See also ==
- Transport in Colombia
- List of airports in Colombia
