= Matanza, Santander =

Coordinates: 7°25′N 73°05′W

- Municipality and town
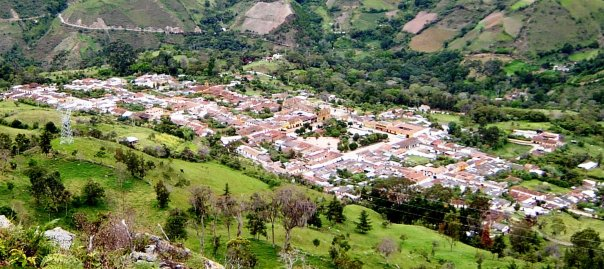

- Flag

- Location of the municipality and town of Matanza, Santander in the Santander Department of Colombia.
- Country: Colombia
- Department: Santander Department
- Time zone: UTC-5 (Colombia Standard Time)

Matanza (Latin American Spanish pronunciation: [maˈtansa]) is a town and municipality in the Santander Department in northeastern Colombia.
