= Battle of Cuchilla del Tambo =

Part of the Colombian War of Independence

Battle of Cuchilla de El Tambo
- Part of the Colombian War of Independence
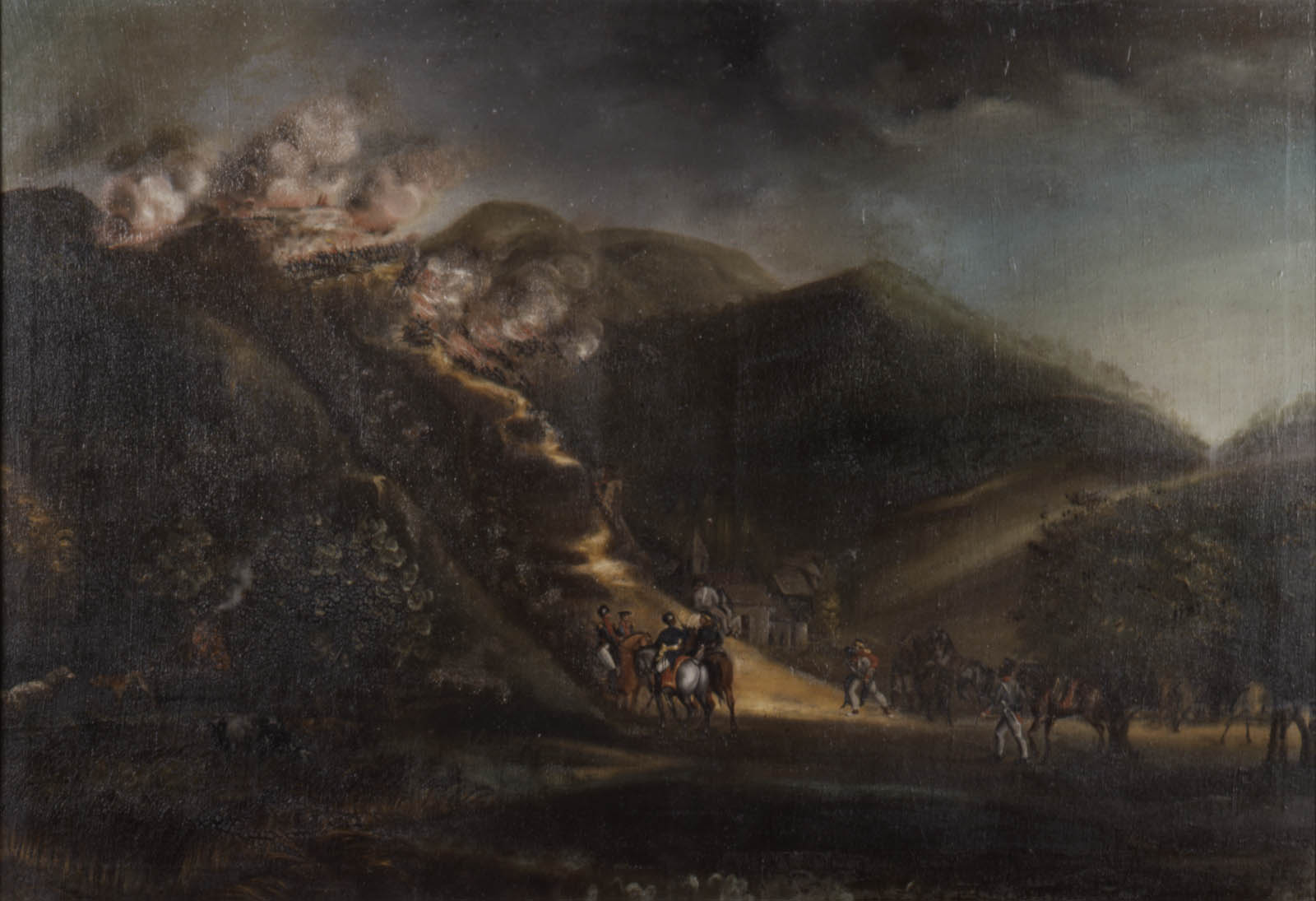
- Painting of the battle by José María Espinosa Prieto (1850).
Date	29 June 1816
Location	El Tambo, Cauca, Viceroyalty of New Granada 2.45417°N 76.8178°W
Result	Spanish victory

Belligerents
United Provinces of New Granada	Kingdom of Spain

Commanders and leaders
Liborio Mejía	(Spain) Juan de Sámano

Strength
770 men	1,400 men

Casualties and losses
250 killed, 300 prisoners	Light

The Battle of La Cuchilla de El Tambo was fought during the Colombian War of Independence, fought between the Republican troops of New Granada and the expeditionary force of the Spanish crown who came to reconquer its former colony. It took place on 29 June 1816, at a place called La cuchilla del Tambo (the ridge of El Tambo), in the vicinity of the town of Popayán (in the south of the present-day Colombia). The Republican troops were completely defeated by the Royalist army. This triumph ended the First Republic of New Granada and completed the Spanish reconquest of New Granada.

On June 27, 1816, Lieutenant Colonel Liborio Mejía and his 680 troops of the southern army of the army of the union left Popayan in the direction of Tambo to meet their enemy. On June 29 they found the Spanish troops who were numerically superior and positioned high up on the ridge of the Cuchilla de El Tambo, which they had fortified and was protected by artillery. The Republican troops fought fiercely for 3 hours but were kept at bay by enemy fire. They were finally surrounded and forced to surrender, with only Mejía and a few men managing to escape.
At the end of the fighting, the battlefield was littered with 250 dead Patriots, while Sámano took 300 prisoners and recovered all the Patriots' war material.

The Spanish then took Popayán shortly after, Colonel Mejia and the last remnants of the army of the union would be defeated days later at the Battle of La Plata marking the end of the first republic and the completion of the Spanish Reconquest of New Granada. The following months would see the arrest and executions of many of the Neogranadine patriots who had spearheaded the revolution in 1810 as well military officers and their supporters by orders of Generals Pablo Morillo and Juan de Sámano and what is known as the Regime of Terror.

== Background ==
The United Provinces of New Granada had declared its independence from Spain in 1811, and by 1815 controlled large parts of present-day Colombia. But in 1815, after the defeat of Napoleon, the restored King Ferdinand VII of Spain had sent a large fleet under command of Pablo Morillo to restore order in the colonies and destroy the Republic.

Pablo Morillo and his veteran troops besieged and straved in to submission the major port city of Cartagena de Indias between 26 August and 6 December 1815.
Spanish Brigadier Sebastián de la Calzada and his 5th Division was sent south and, after defeating the Patriot troops at the battles of Bálaga and Cachirí, occupied the capital Santafé de Bogotá on 6 May 1816.

The Republicans now only controlled the area around the cities of Popayán and Cali, but were attacked from 3 sides. From Quito and Peru, Royalist forces were sent north to San Juan de Pasto for a major offensive against Popayán. They were commanded by Brigadier Juan de Sámano, who established his headquarters in Pasto. At the same time, from Cartagena de Indias, Pablo Morillo advanced south at the head of his expeditionary force. To the east, Bogotá and the center of the country were occupied by the Spanish generals Miguel de la Torre and Sebastián de la Calzada.

In May 1816, Sámano left Pasto towards Popayán and camped with 1,400 men on the cuchilla del Tambo. During this time, the Republican troops were based in Popayán under the command of General José María Cabal, but he was replaced by Lieutenant-Colonel Liborio Mejía for being over-cautious. The new commander of the Patriot troops now took the bold decision to attack the Royalist forces rather than surrender.

== The Battle ==
Sketch of the Terrain of the Town of Tambo, During the Battle of La Cuchilla del Tambo on June 29, 1816. Made on July 19, 1818, in Santafé de Bogotá, by Antonio José Caballero. military archive of

On 27 June 1816, Lt. Colonel Liborio Mejía and the army of the south set out in search of the royalist army. The next day, June 28, they arrived at the village of Pingua where they were sighted by some advanced royal troops, who then received orders from Brigadier Juan de Sámano to fallback towards the fortified positions on the ridge.

The defensive strategy adopted by Sámano aimed at not only to repelling the Republican attack but inflict as much damage to them before their arrival at the position, with the purpose of gaining time to withdraw the field hospital established in the town of Tambo and to complete the defensive arrangements on the ridge. For this, he deployed on the afternoon of the 28th a column of 200 men under the command of the royalist guerrilla leader Simón Muñoz, so that divided into two groups, they would delay the advance of the republicans, moving from mound to mound, holding one group while the other withdrew to a new position, and repeating the same successively until reaching the town of Tambo. In the town of Tambo there was a royalist guard under the command of Major Francisco Jiménez, protecting the hospital that had been established there. Sámano ordered Jiménez to withdraw and to place the hospital one days march behind the main position, which he executed without difficulty.

On June 29, 1816 at 6 in the morning, the republicans approached the royalist positions, they divided their forces into two equal sections: the first section which had the cavalry, took the royal road towards the town of Tambo; the second section who had the artillery went parallel to them and would attempt to assault the right flank of the fortified ridge.

When the Republicans approached the town of Tambo, Sámano advanced beyond the town, in order to carry out a reconnaissance mission that would allow him to observe the movements adopted by the republicans. Thanks to this, he found that the Republicans had divided themselves into two columns; one passing through the town and the other to the right of the ridge. To further delay the republicans’ march, Sámano returned to the fortified positions and ordered that a column of the militias of Pasto, around 200 men, under the orders of Ramón Zambrano, go out to meet the enemy and offer some resistance, in the same form of as the successive jumps that Muñoz’s guerrillas were conducting.

The royalist column commanded by Muñoz, did not withdraw back the position, but instead placed themselves in a position to the left of the town of Tambo, with the purpose of conducting an attack behind the backs of the republicans, when they would attempt to scale the ridge. Reinforced Zambrano’s column with two more companies, he undertook a dilatory combat until he received orders from Sámano to retreat, in order to attract the already fatigued enemy to the entrenchments.

One of the republican troops Sub-Lieutenant José Hilario López, who was later president of Colombia, noted in his Memoirs that:

“Our column reached the last mamelon which was at a distance of half-range of musket fire from the enemy encampment, and there we placed our two cannons, and awaited for the first section to approach, and that the order for the assault be given by the Commander-in-chief, who was marching on the side of the Tambo. Verified this, the signal was given, to which we attacked violently the enemy fortifications, where we were greeted with a deadly fire of artillery and musketry; but that’s not why we stopped fixing our flags at the very foot of their entrenchments.”

The standard-bearer of the Granaderos de Cundinamarca infantry battalion, Ensign José María Espinosa, noted for his part

“Our fire was focused there, which lasted more than an hour without result, and with our ammunition being scarce, the Granaderos de Cundinamarca battalion was given the order to advance. Our soldiers threw themselves with the greatest courage and reached the foot of the entrenchments, but seeing that we suffered many casualties and began to give way, we were reinforced with the Antioquia battalion, the combat became widespread, as we committed to the attack of the fortifications almost all our troops.”

The Republican cavalry armed with carbines was placed on the left flank. When the time came, they attacked the royalist cavalry, who were armed with lances, and forced them to retreat to the site called “Los Aguacates”, where they were able regroup, as the Republicans did not continue their attack, as they had to secure the main road, the only one that the enemy could take in case of withdrawal.

For three hours from 7am to 10am the republicans fought fiercely to take the royalist fortifications but lacking the equipment to climb them and coupled with the limited supply of ammunition they had, were unable to take the fortifications. As described before, the royalist artillery pieces wreaked great havoc from the fortifications where they had been pre-loaded to make their shots. It was around noon that the column of royalist guerrillas attacked the republicans from behind. Sámano took advantage of this moment to launch a counterattack and ordered his troops out of the entrenchments and to attack the Republicans.

As a result the republicans became surrounded on all sides and order disintegrated, of which Ensign Espinosa commented

“It was no longer possible to work in concert, everyone did what they could and we fought desperately; but it was impossible to regroup, or even resist the torrent of enemies who, coming out of their parapets, surrounded us and squeezed us until we had to surrender. We succumbed but with glory.”

The republicans were surrounded and were either killed or captured, marking the end of the battle. Sámano wrote “It cannot be denied that these wicked people committed themselves with all their spite, reaching less than a block of the entrenchments. but everything was in vain”.

== Consequences ==
On 1 July 1816, Sámano's army took possession of Popayán. Among the prisoners made there was the soldier José Hilario López, who is condemned to death but was providentially saved. Lopez would become President of Colombia between 1849 and 1853. The forerunner to the independence of Ecuador Carlos de Montúfar was not so lucky: he was captured, sentenced to death in Buga and executed shortly after.

Mejía fled with his last supporters to La Plata. It all ended on 10 July, when the Royalist commander Carlos Tolrá attacked the Patriot positions at La Plata and captured President Mejía. He was transferred to Bogotá, where on 3 September 1816, Mejía was executed for treason.

The victory of the Cuchilla del Tambo was decisive for the career of Brigadier Juan de Sámano. As a reward for his victory, General Pablo Morillo named him General commander of New Granada, and summoned him to the capital Santafé de Bogotá. where he arrived there on 23 October 1816.

The rout of the Republicans at the Cuchilla del Tambo put a definitive end to the First Republic of New Granada. The Spanish Reconquest of New Granada was then completed, with the exception of a few areas in the Casanare Province which remained under the control of the Republicans led by Francisco de Paula Santander.

== Sources ==
- Jesús María y Arrubla Gerardo Henao, Historia de Colombia Para la Enseñanza Secundaria, Bogotá, Voluntad, 1952, p. 342-344
- Córdova : gloria y asesinato del héroe. Tomo I / Armando Barona Mesa; prólogo del académico Antonio Cacua Prada
